= Timeline of women in warfare in the United States from 1950 to 1999 =

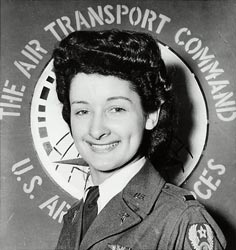
Captain Lillian Kinkella Keil, USAF

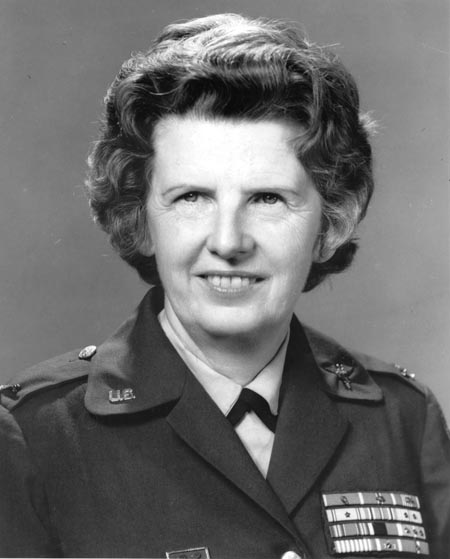
Colonel Ruby Bradley, United States Army

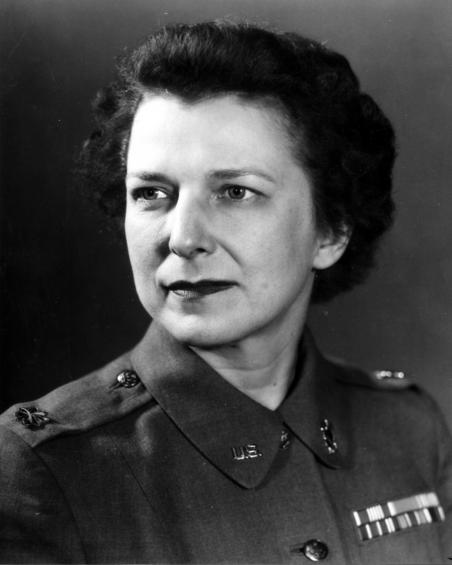
Colonel Irene O. Galloway, United States Army

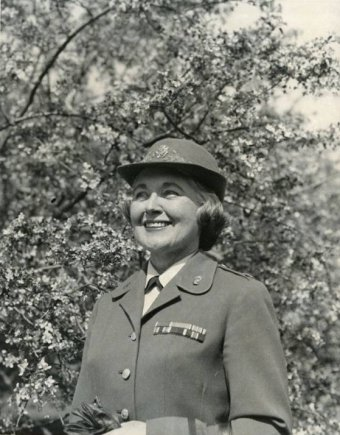
Colonel Mary Louise Rasmuson, United States Army

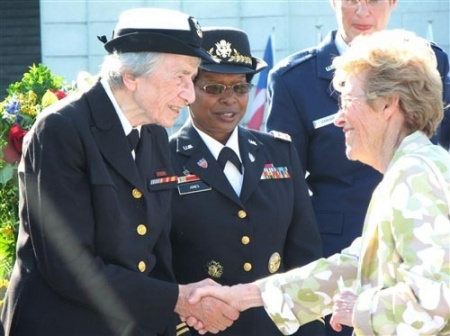
Master Chief Petty Officer Anna Der-Vartanian, USN (left) shakes hands with Major General Jeanne Holm, USAF (right)

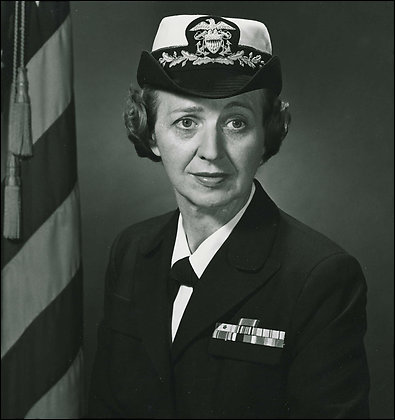
Captain Ruth Alice Erickson, USN

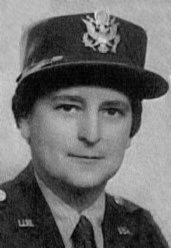
Lieutenant colonel Mercedes O. Cubria, United States Army

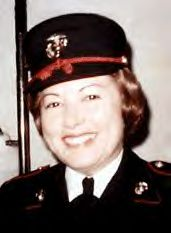
Chief Warrant Officer 3 Rose Franco, USMC (ret.)

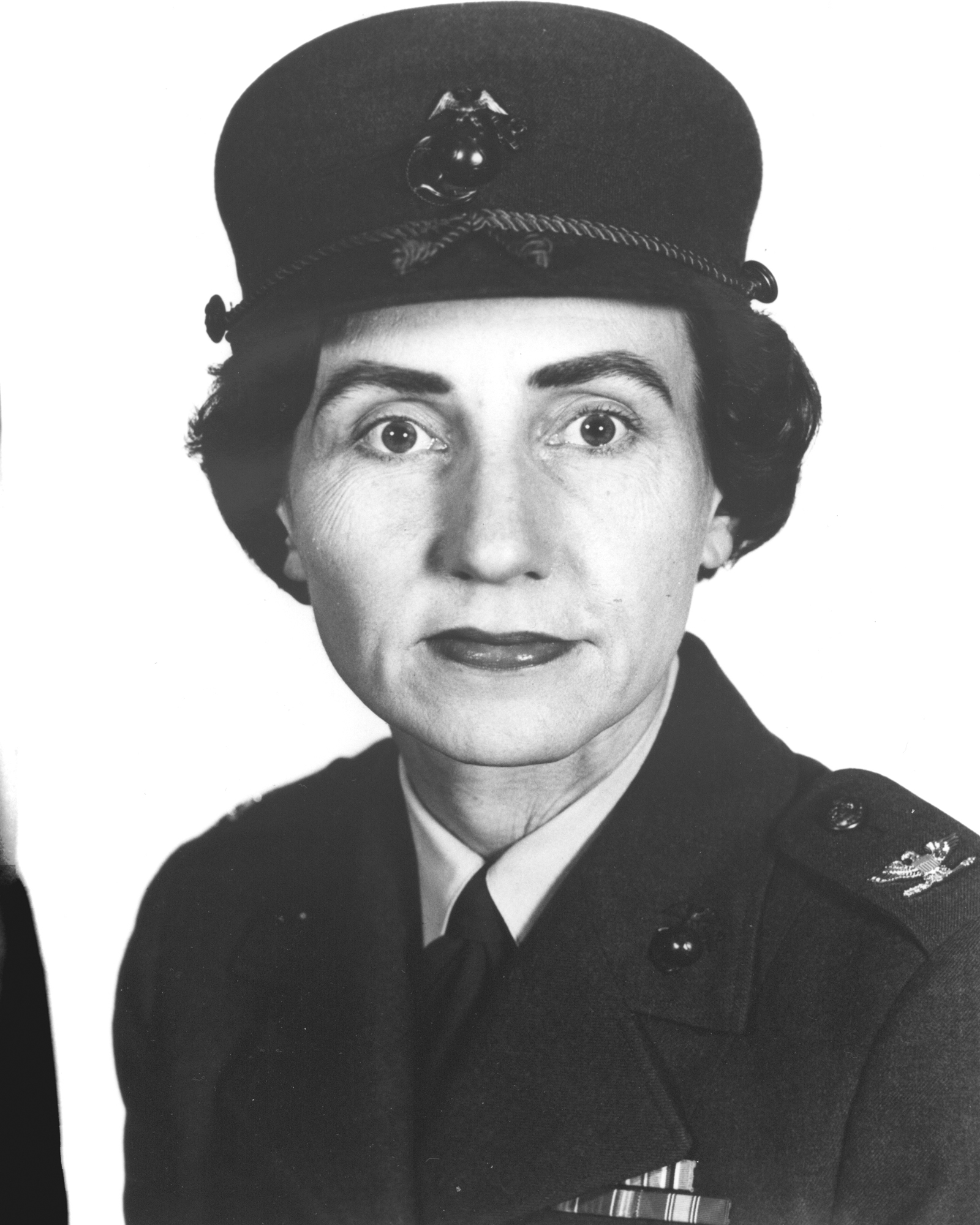
Colonel Barbara J. Bishop, USMC

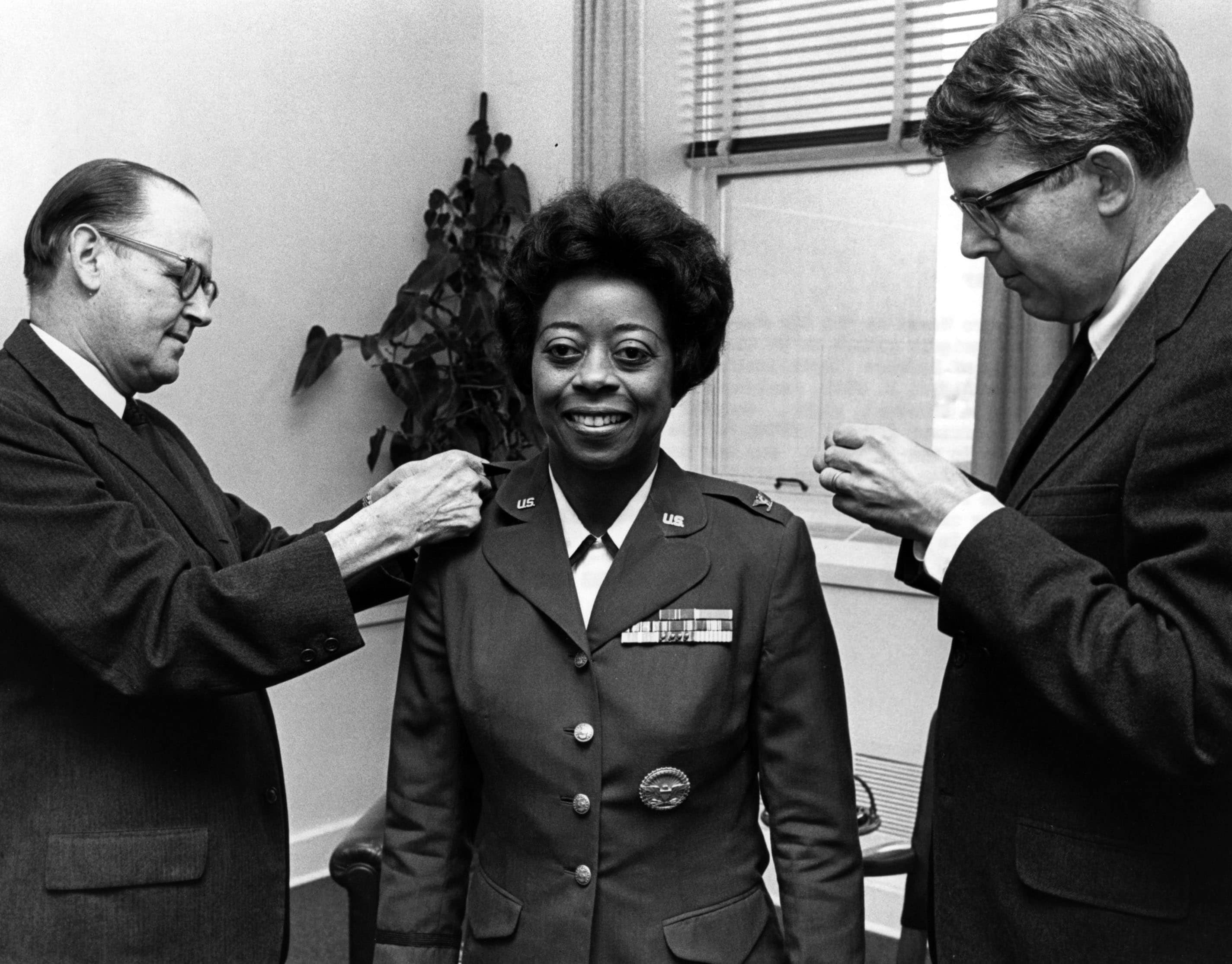
Colonel Ruth A. Lucas, USAF

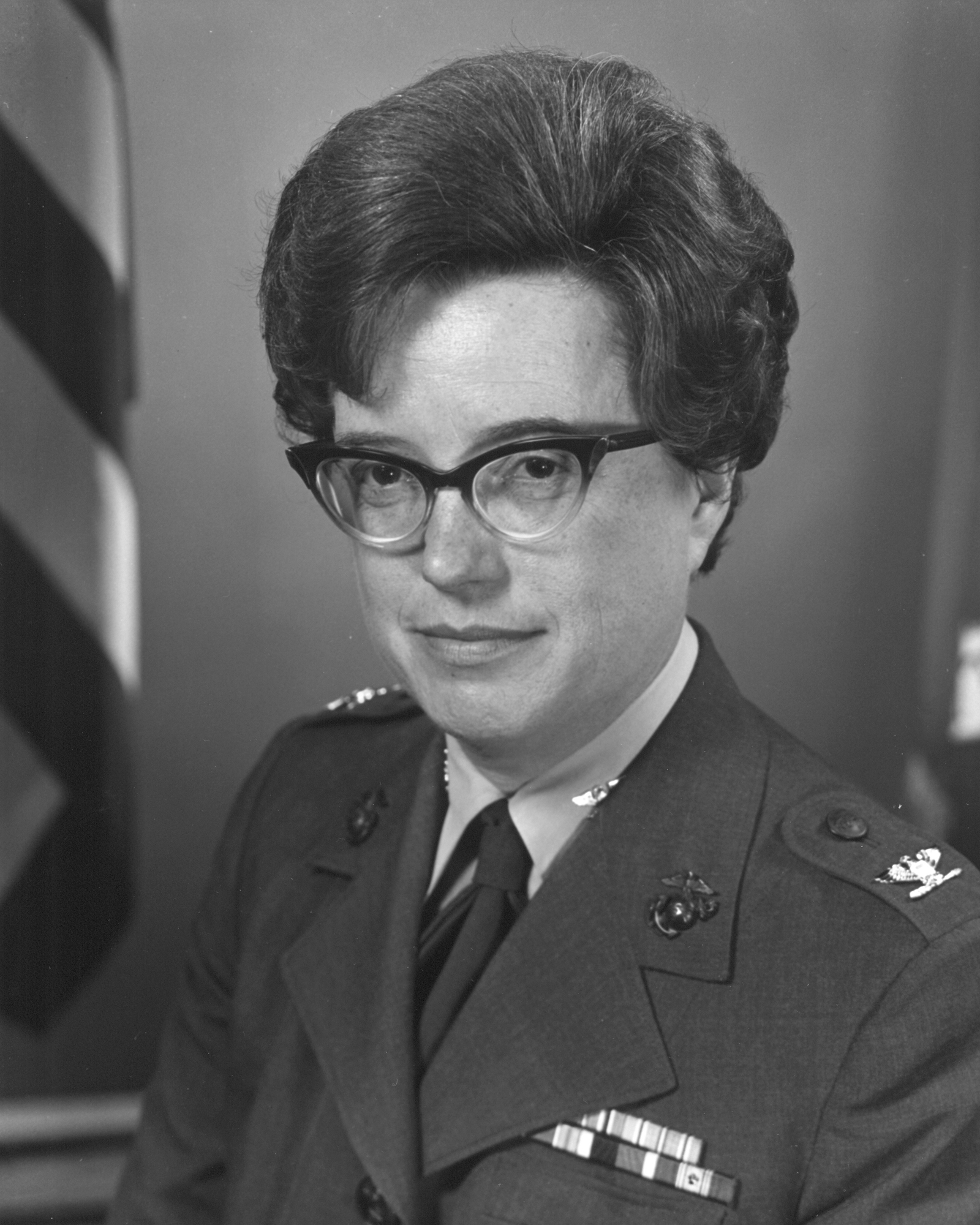
Colonel Jeanette I. Sustad, USMC

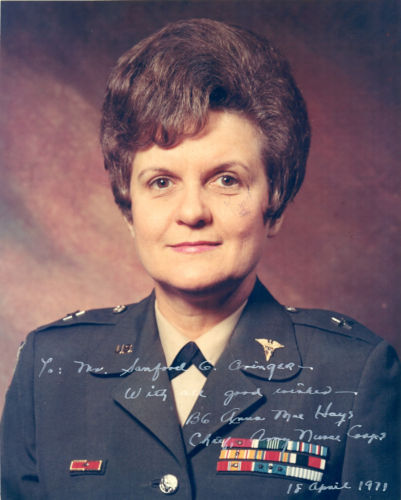
Brig. Gen. Anna Mae Hays, Army (ret.)

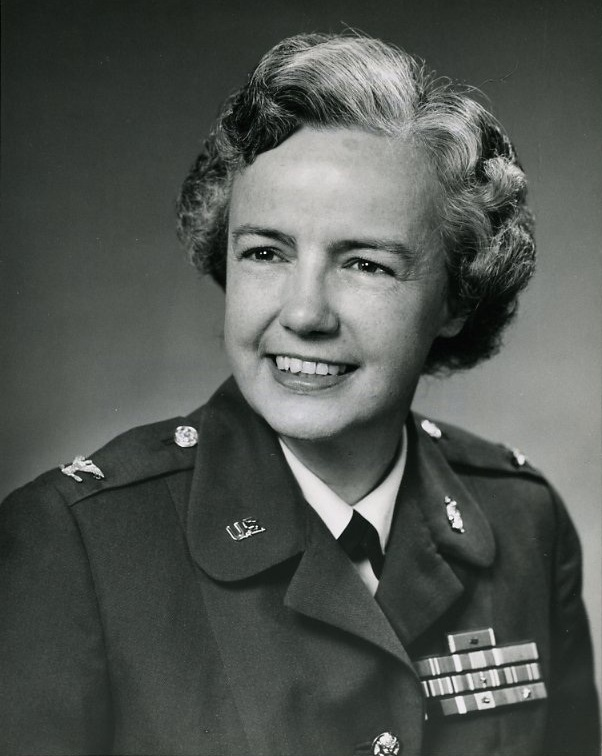
Brig. Gen. Elizabeth P. Hoisington, Army

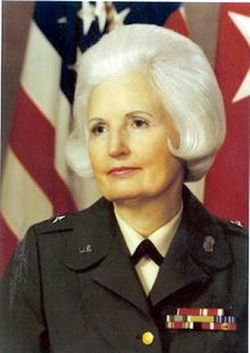
Brig. Gen. Mildred Inez Caroon Bailey, Army

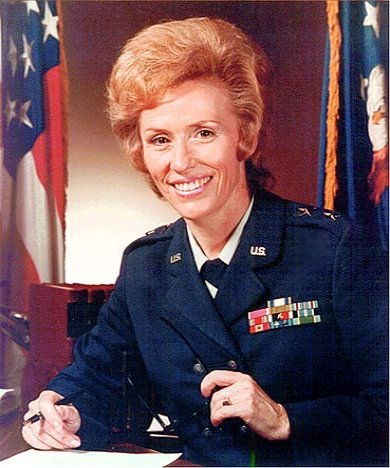
Major General Jeanne Holm, USAF

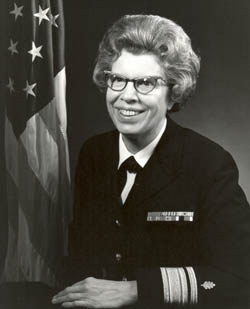
Rear Admiral Alene Duerk, USN (ret.)

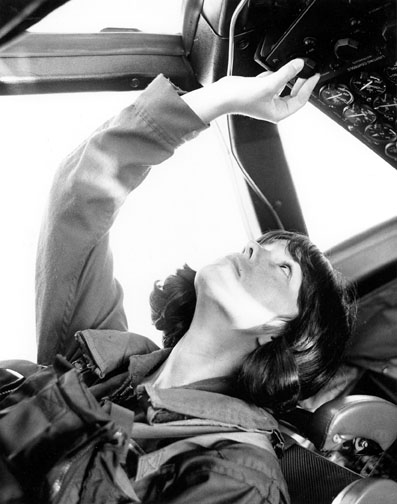
Captain Judith Neuffer, USN (ret.)

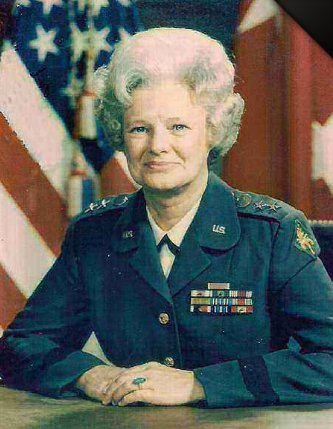
Major General Mary E. Clarke, Army

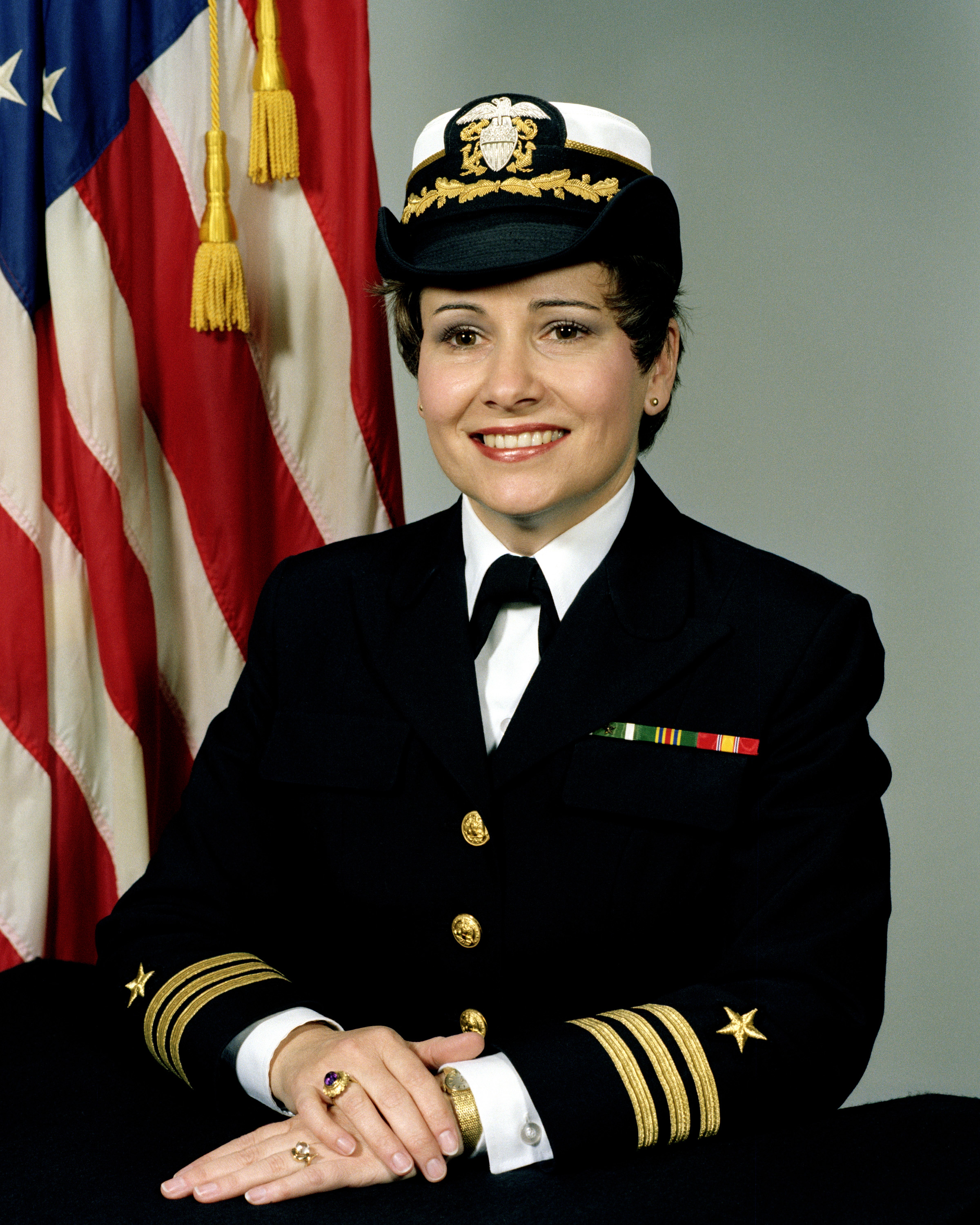
Lieutenant Kathleen Byerly, USN

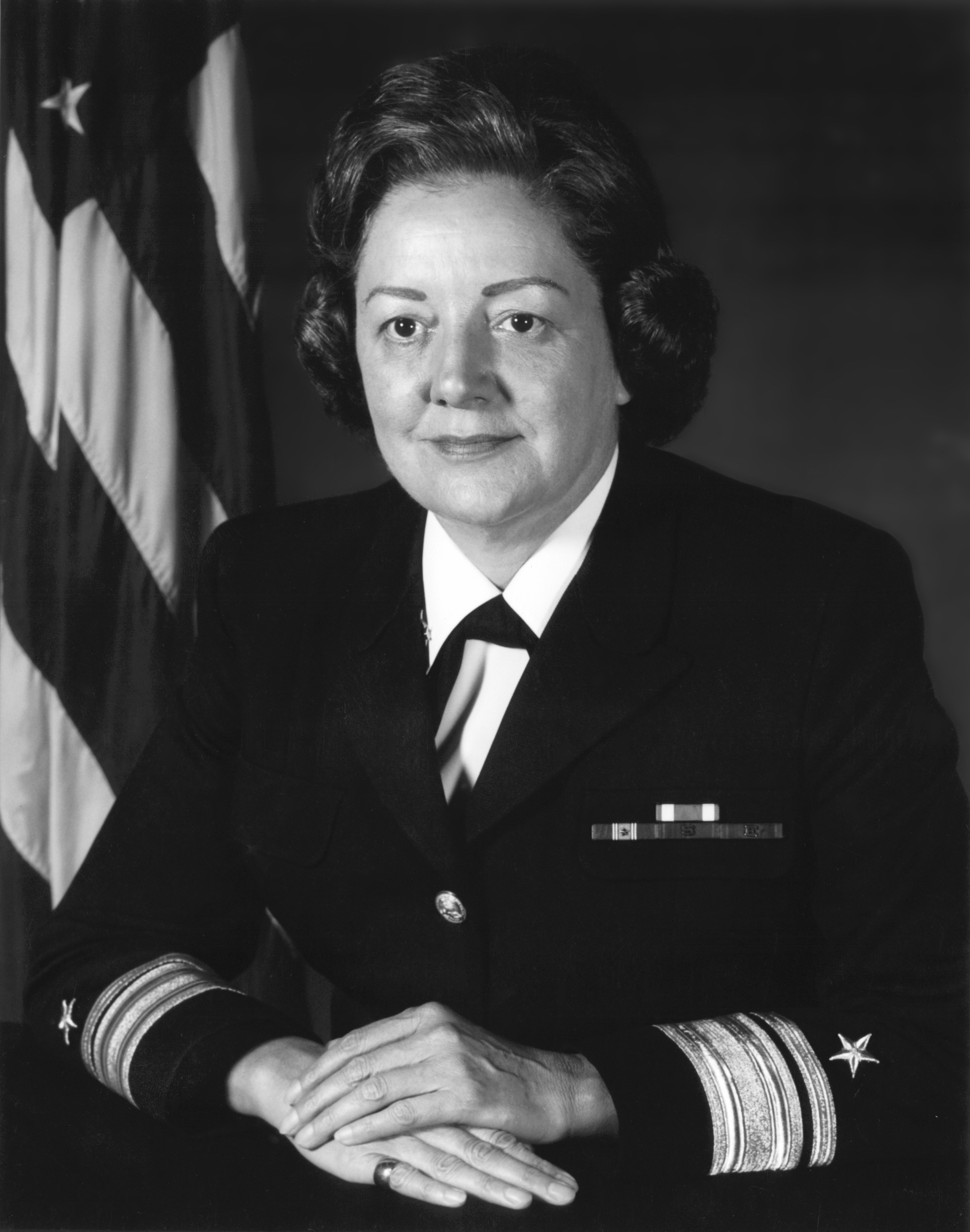
Rear Admiral Fran McKee, USN

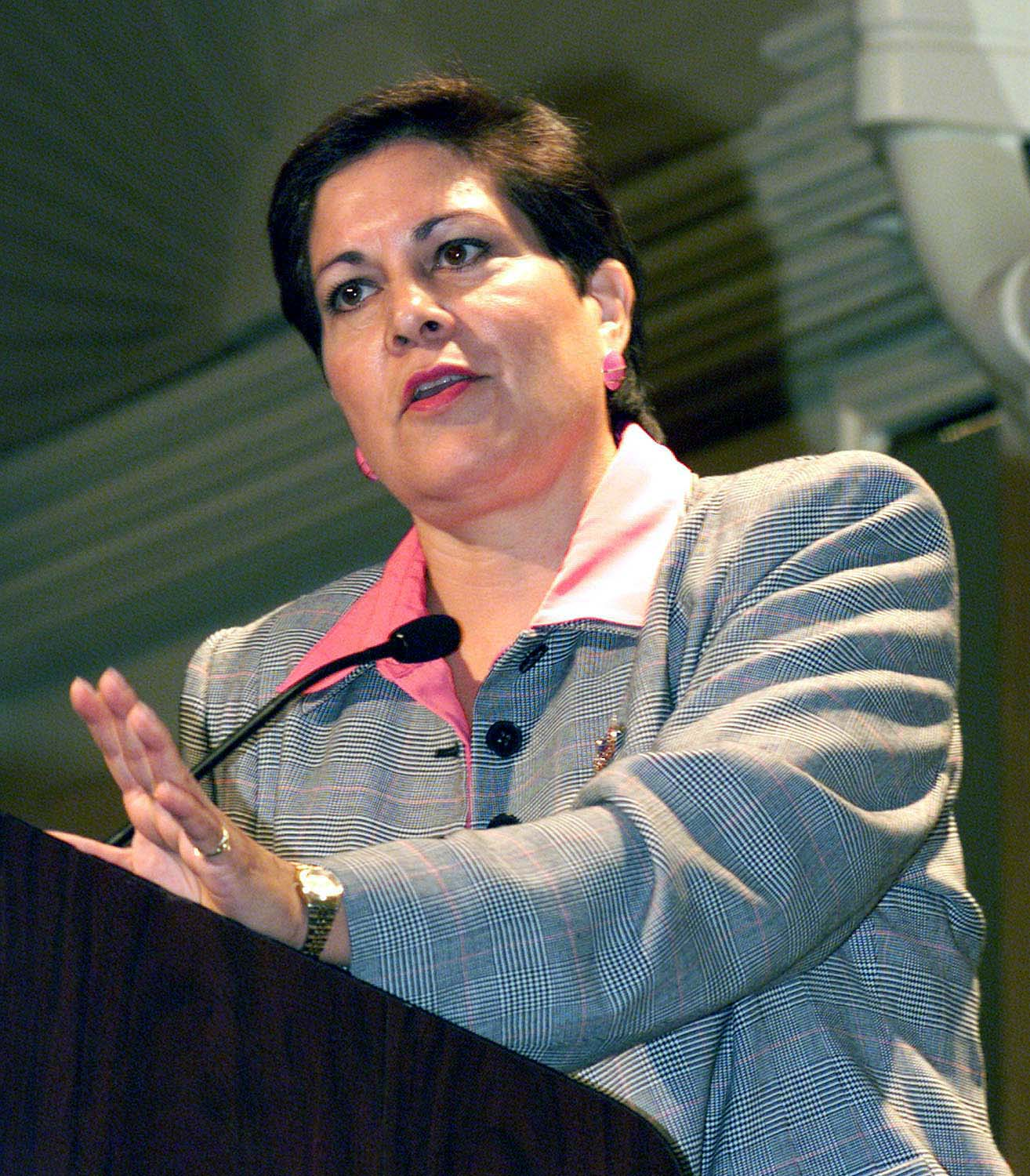
Captain Linda Garcia Cubero, USAF (ret.)

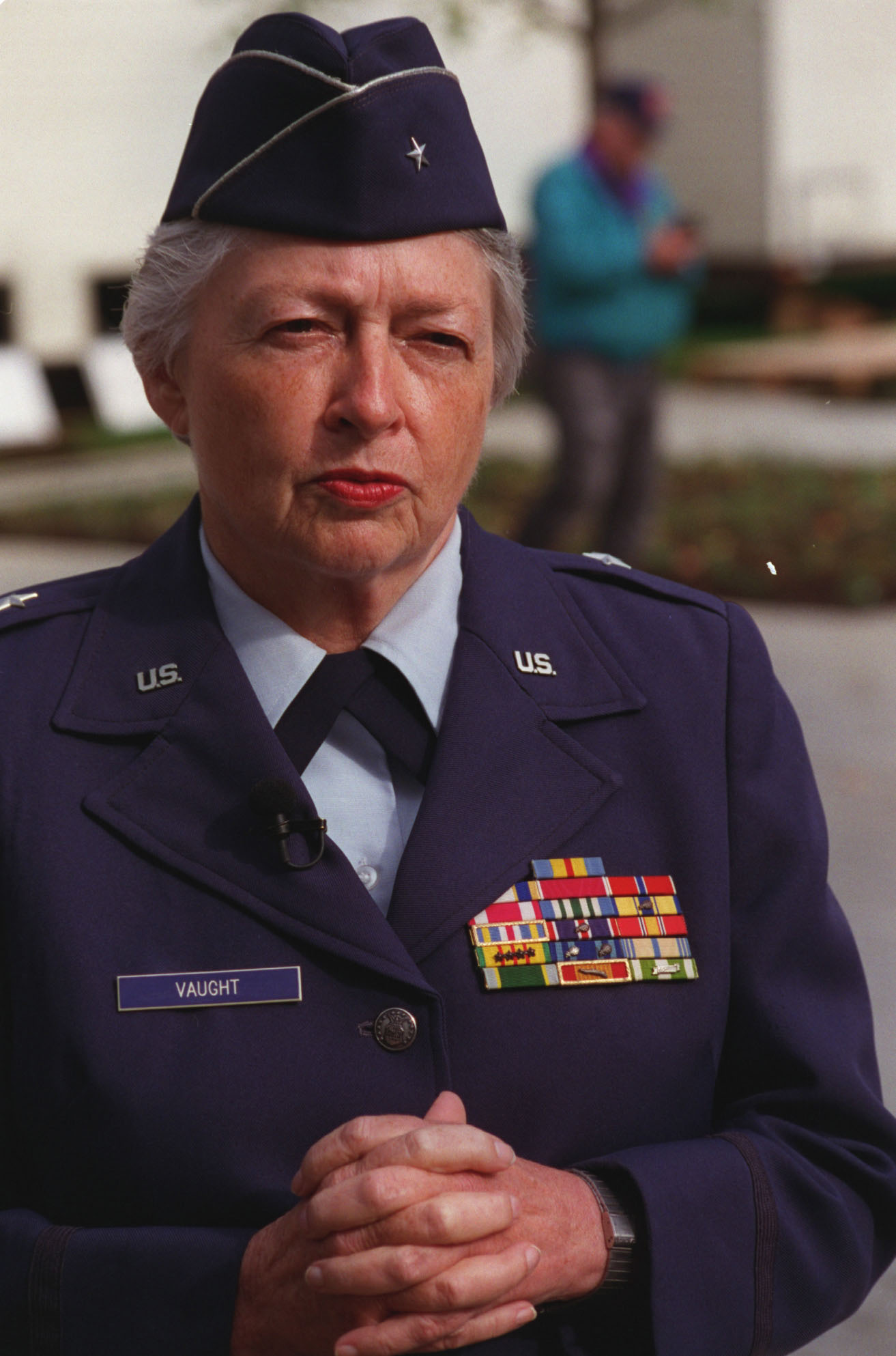
Brigadier General Wilma Vaught, USAF (ret.)

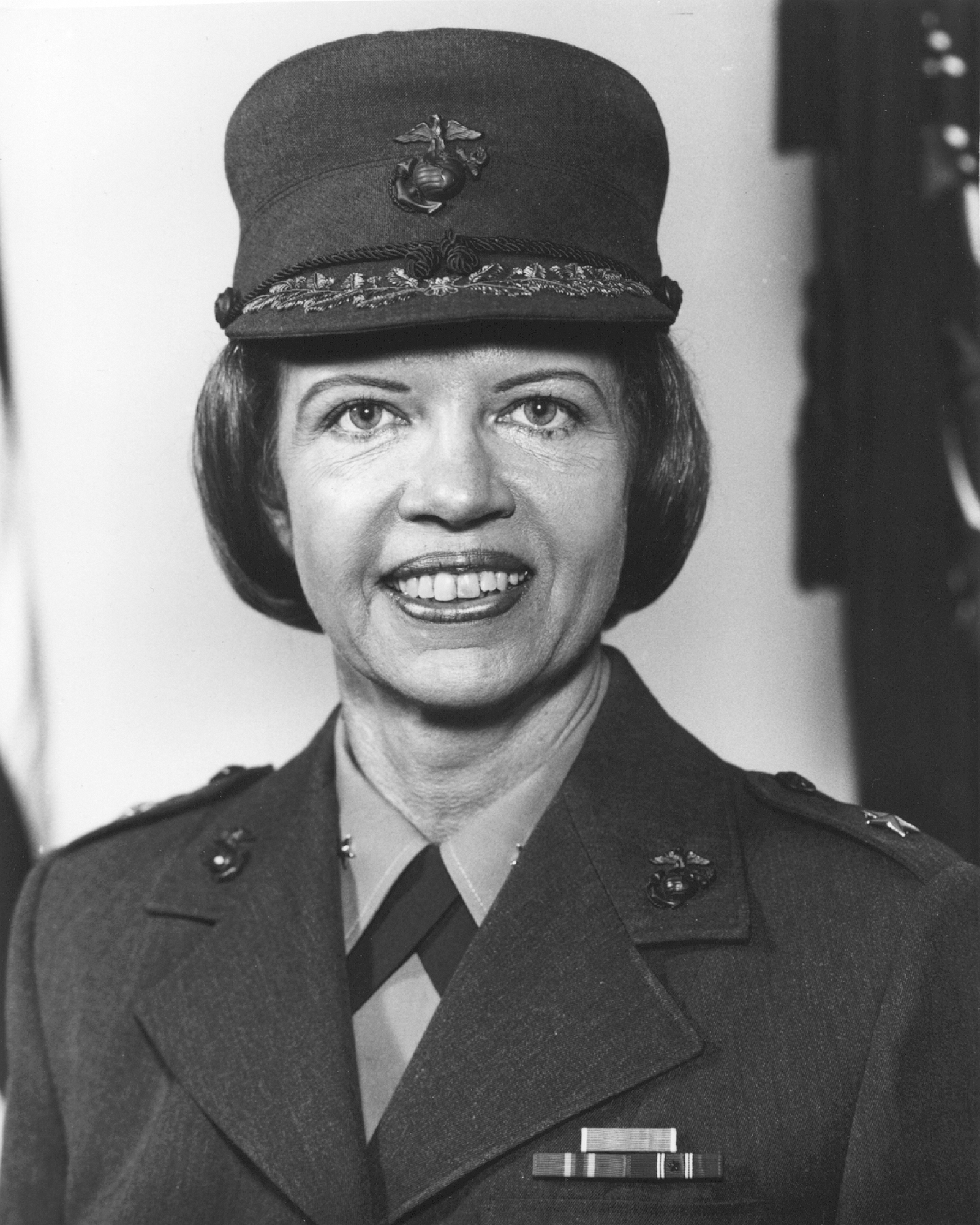
Brig. Gen. Margaret A. Brewer, USMC

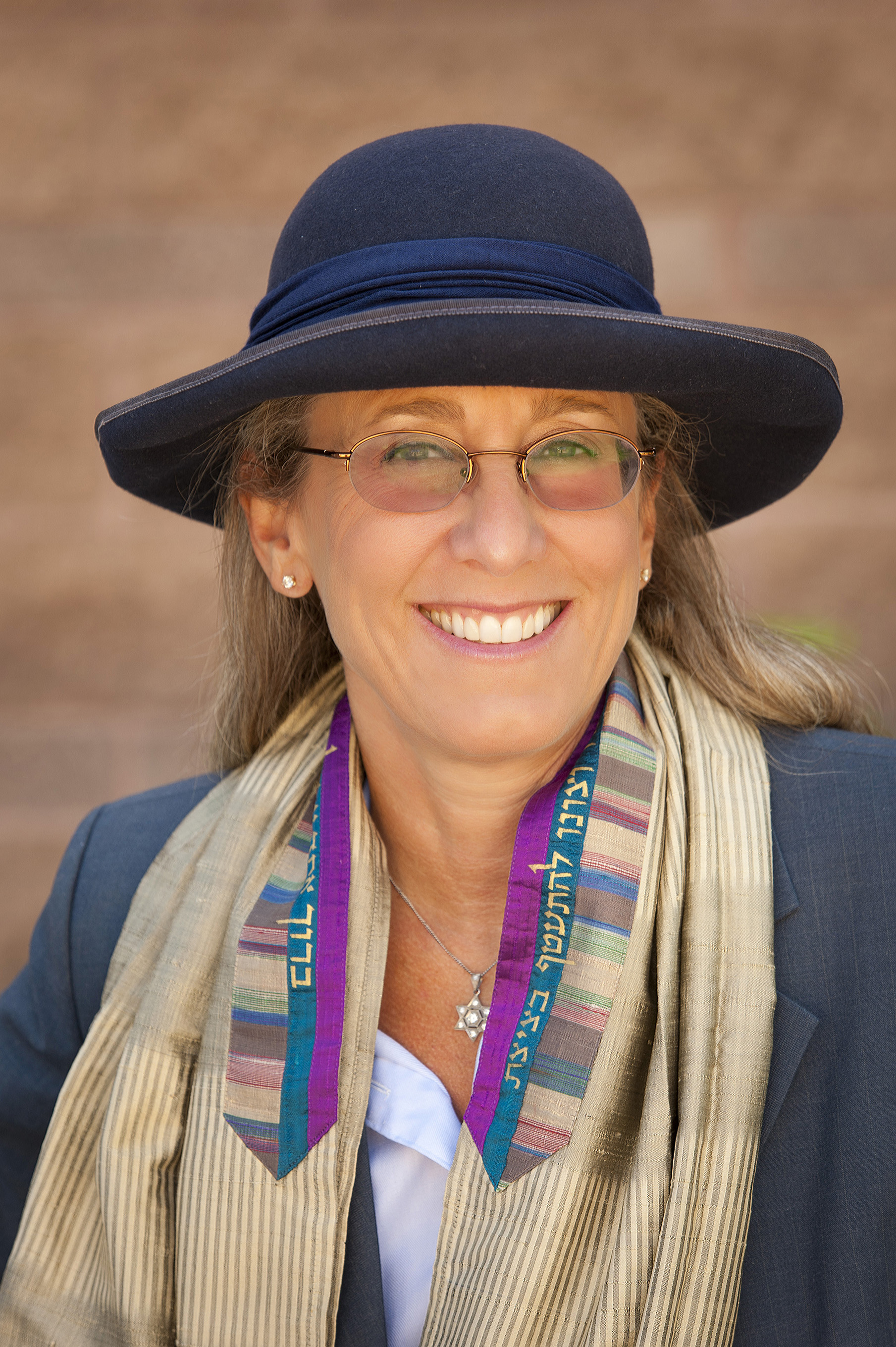
Rabbi Bonnie Koppell

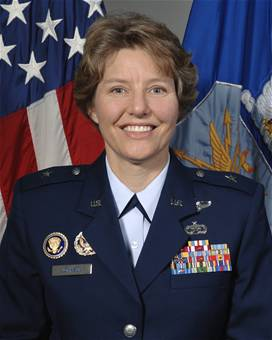
Lt. Gen Michelle D. Johnson, USAF (ret.)

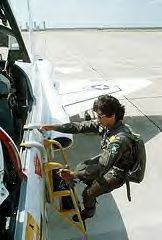
Lt Col Olga E. Custodio, USAF, (ret.)

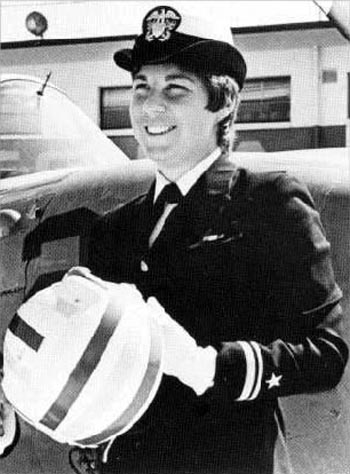
Lieutenant commander Barbara Allen Rainey, USN

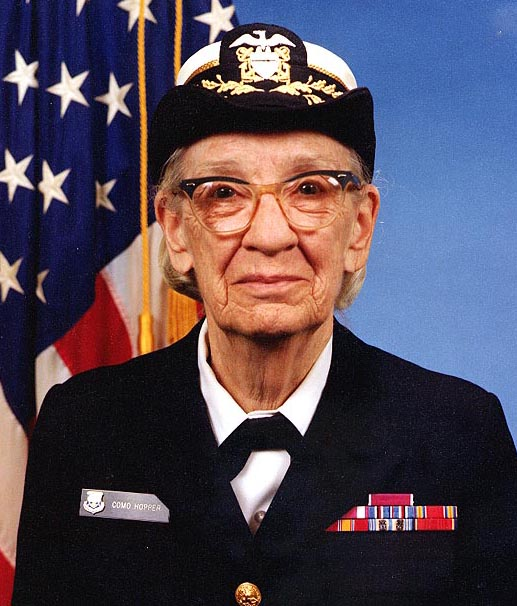
Rear admiral (lower half) Grace Hopper, USN

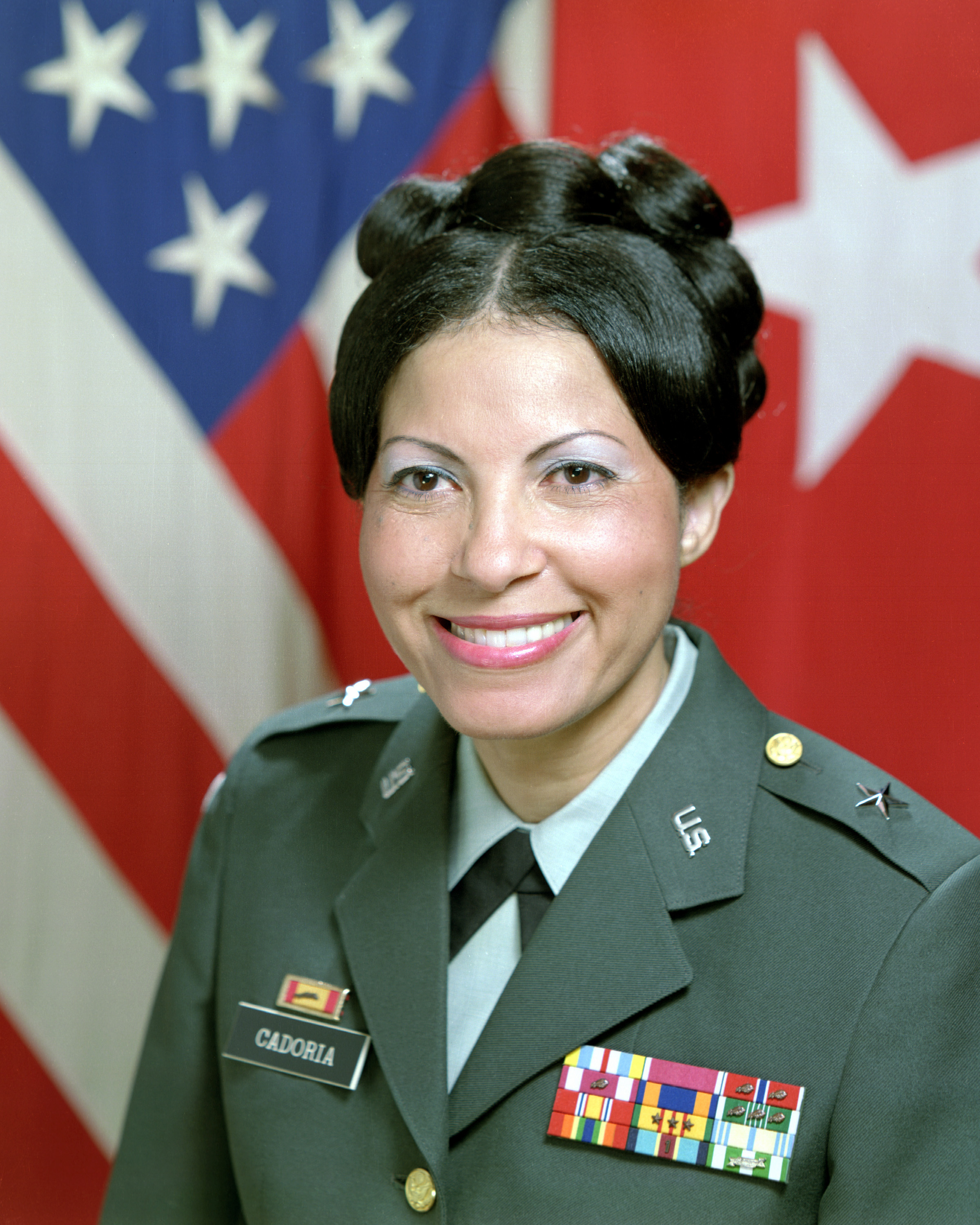
BG Sherian Cadoria, United States Army (ret.)

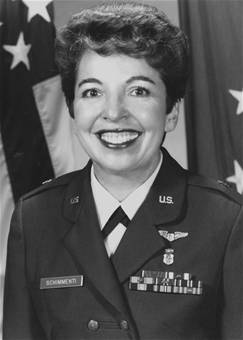
Brigadier General Carmelita Vigil-Schimmenti, USAF (ret.)

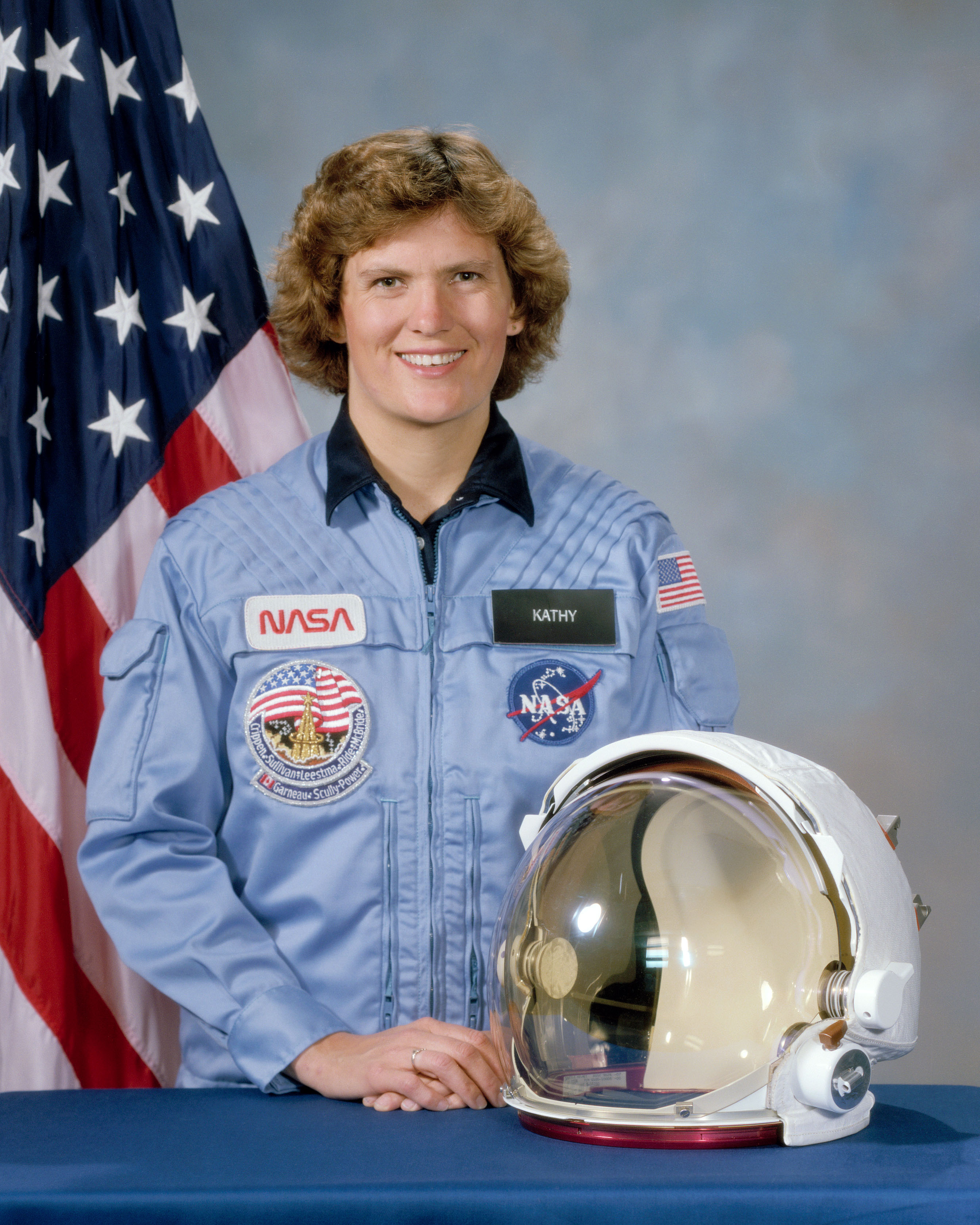
Captain Kathryn D. Sullivan, USN (ret.)

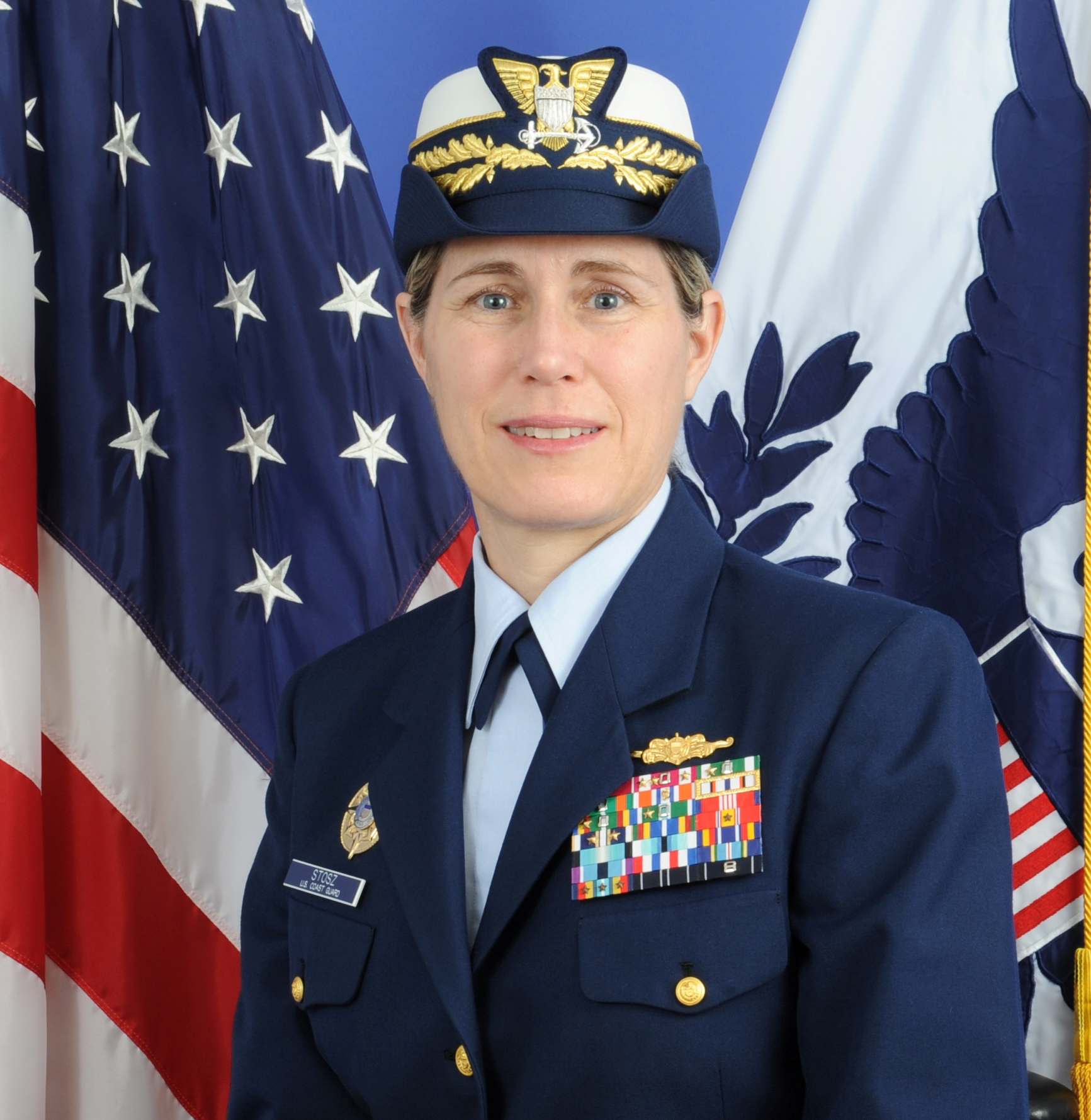
Rear Admiral Sandra L. Stosz, USCG

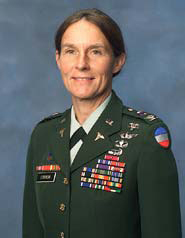
BG Rhonda Cornum, United States Army (ret.)

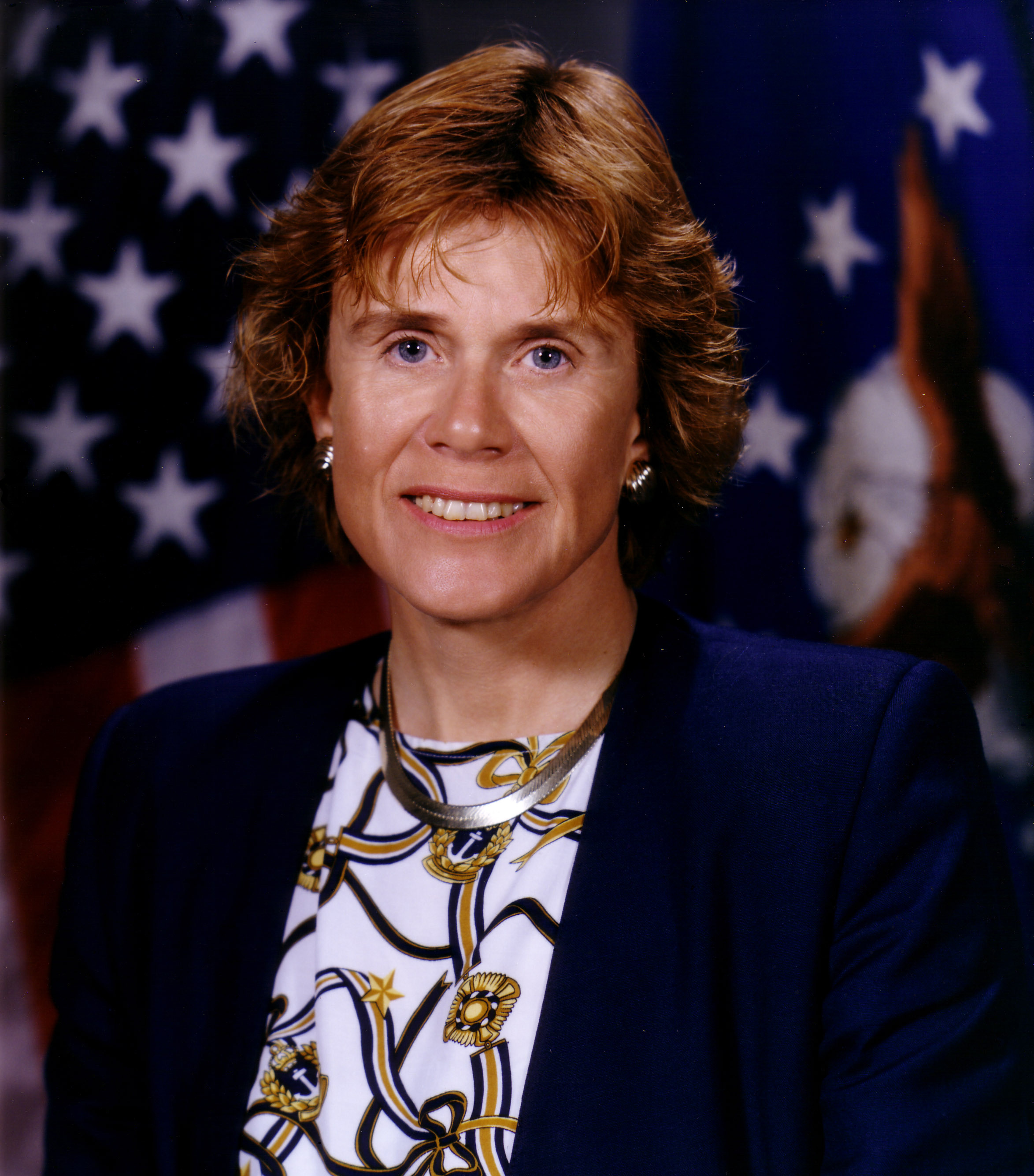
Dr. Sheila Widnall

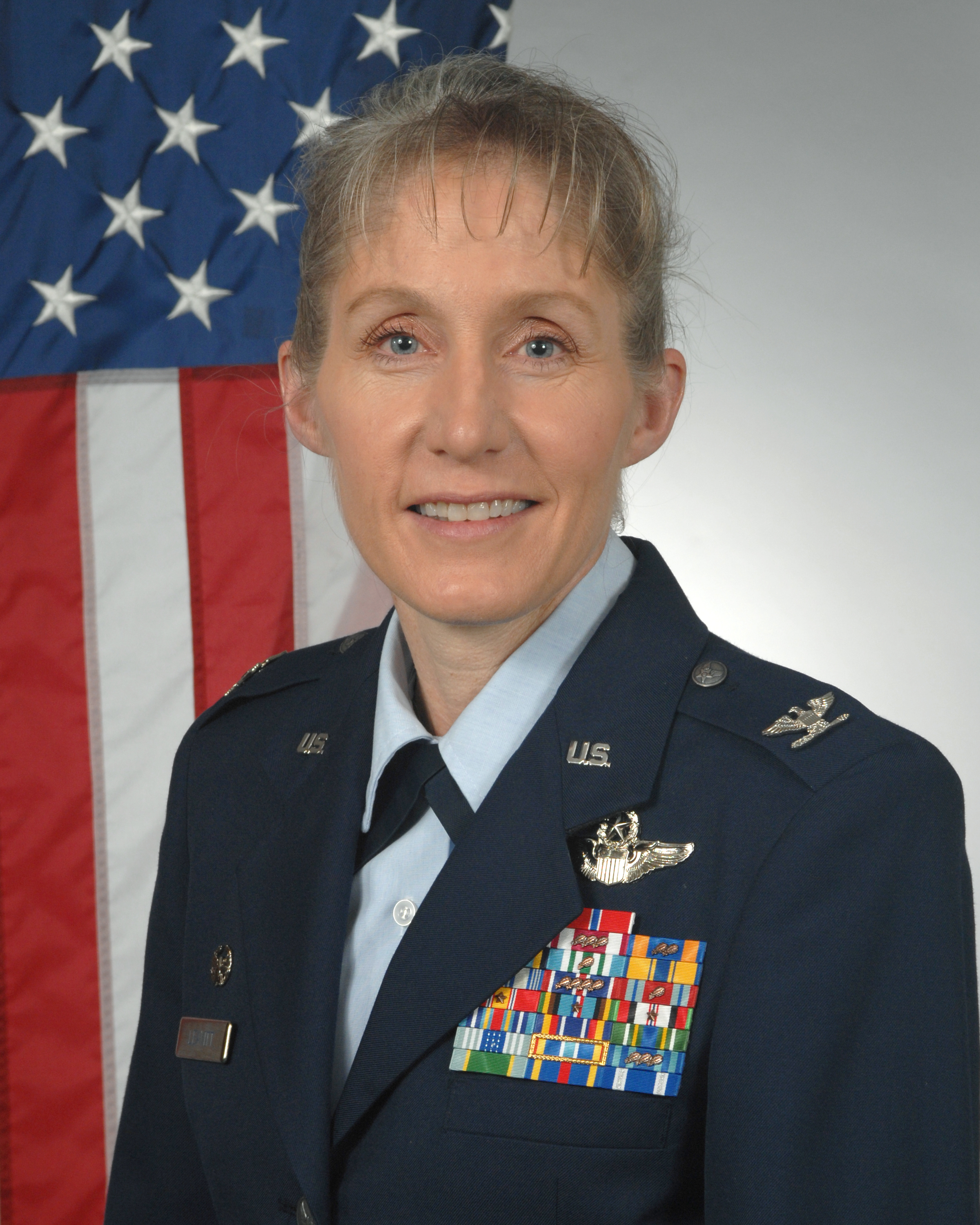
Col. Jeannie Leavitt, USAF

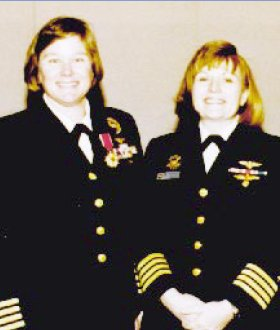
Captain Jane Skiles O'Dea, USN (ret). Pictured with her is her flight school classmate Captain Rosemary Bryant Mariner to her left.

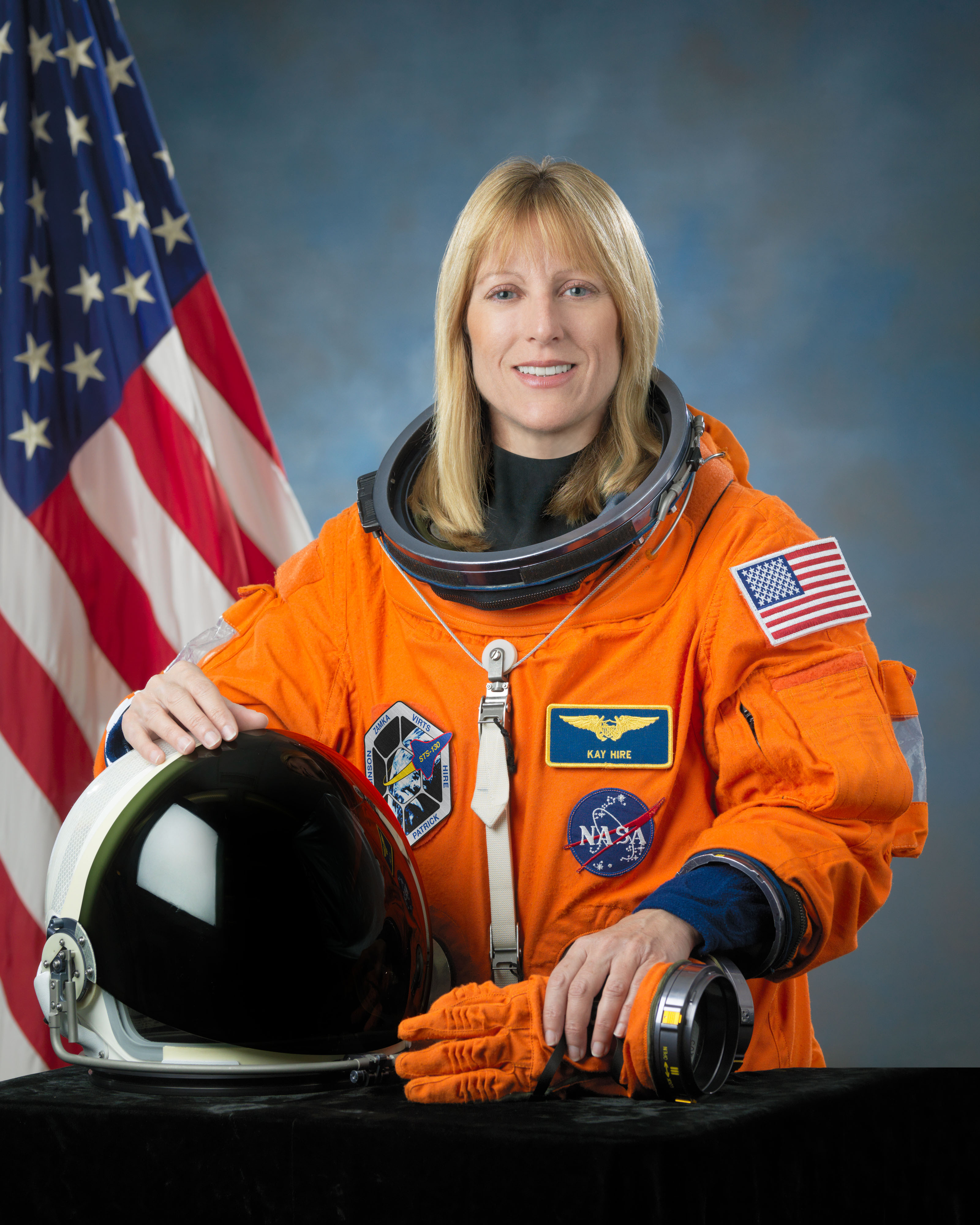
Captain Kathryn P. Hire, USN

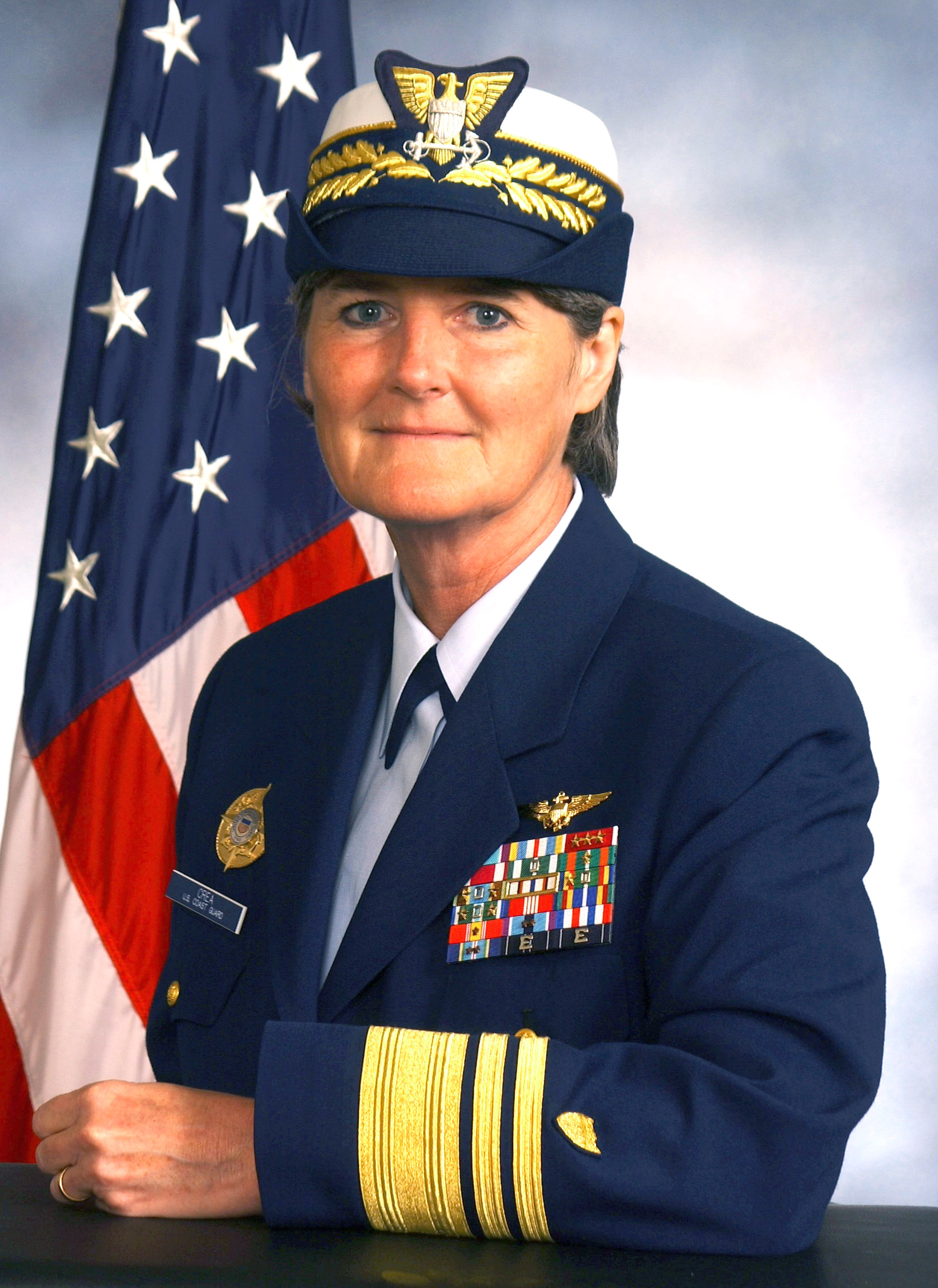
Vice Admiral Vivien Crea, USCG (ret.)

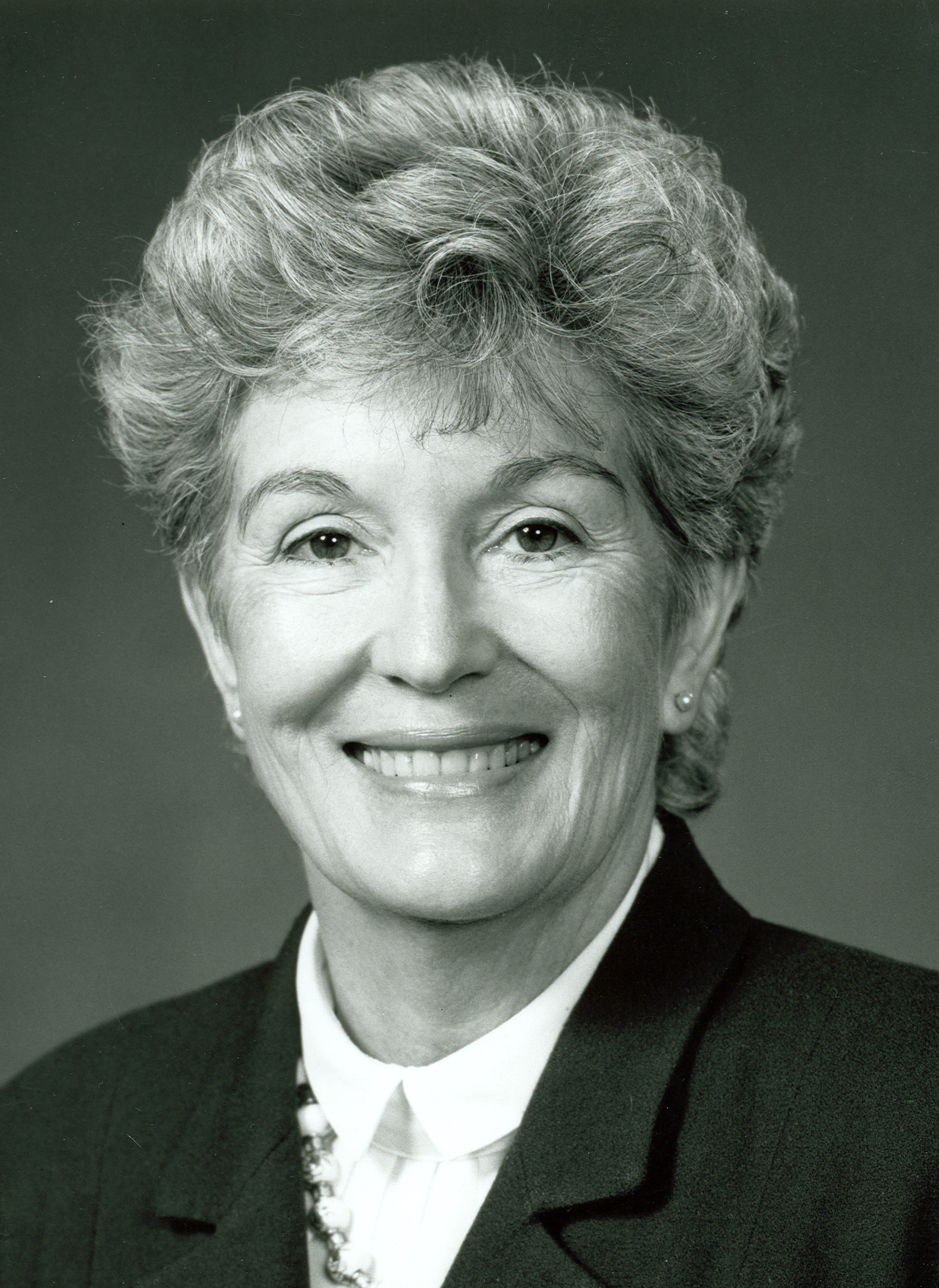
Catherine Small Long, USN (ret.)

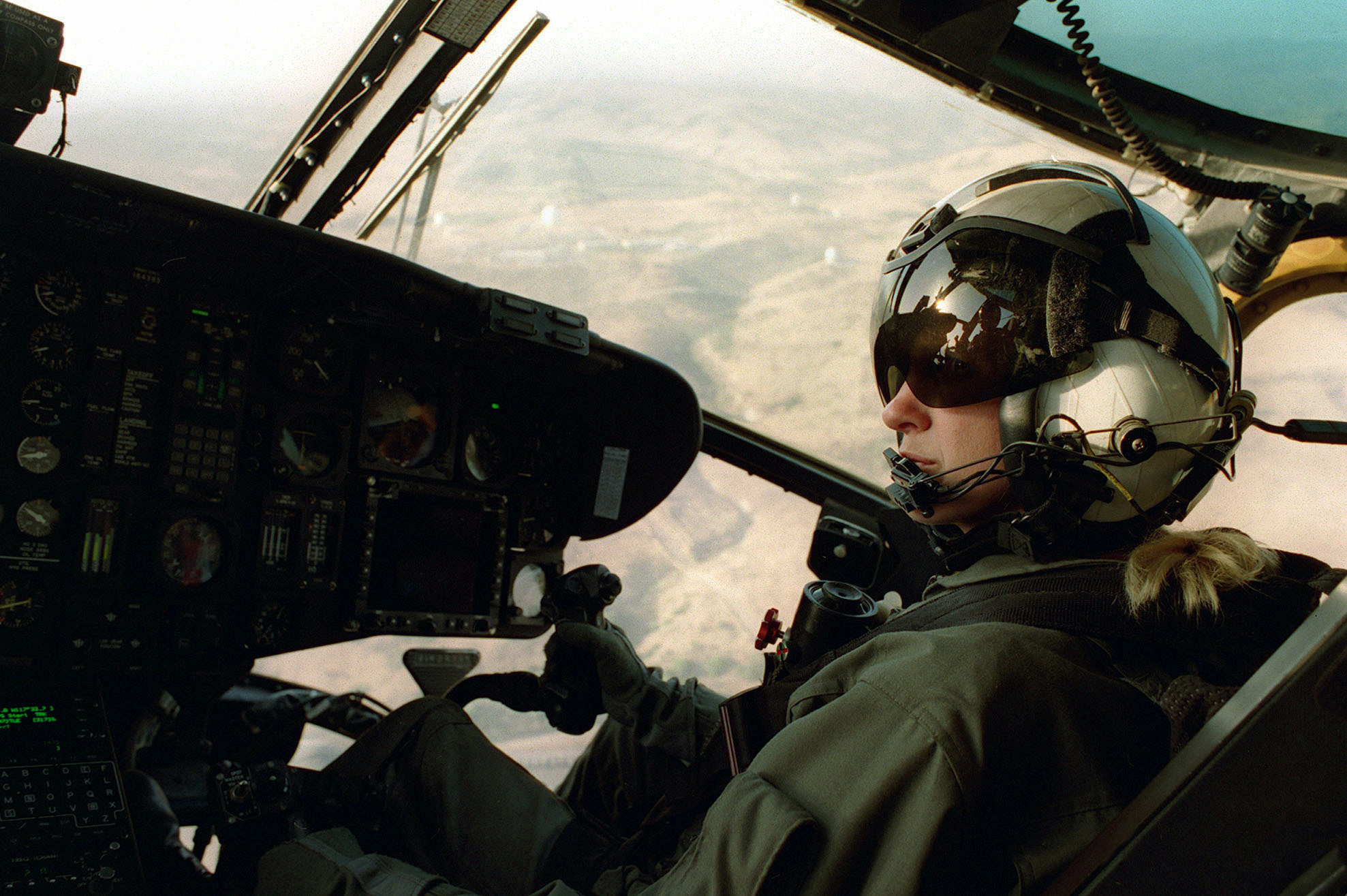
LtCol Sarah Deal, USMC

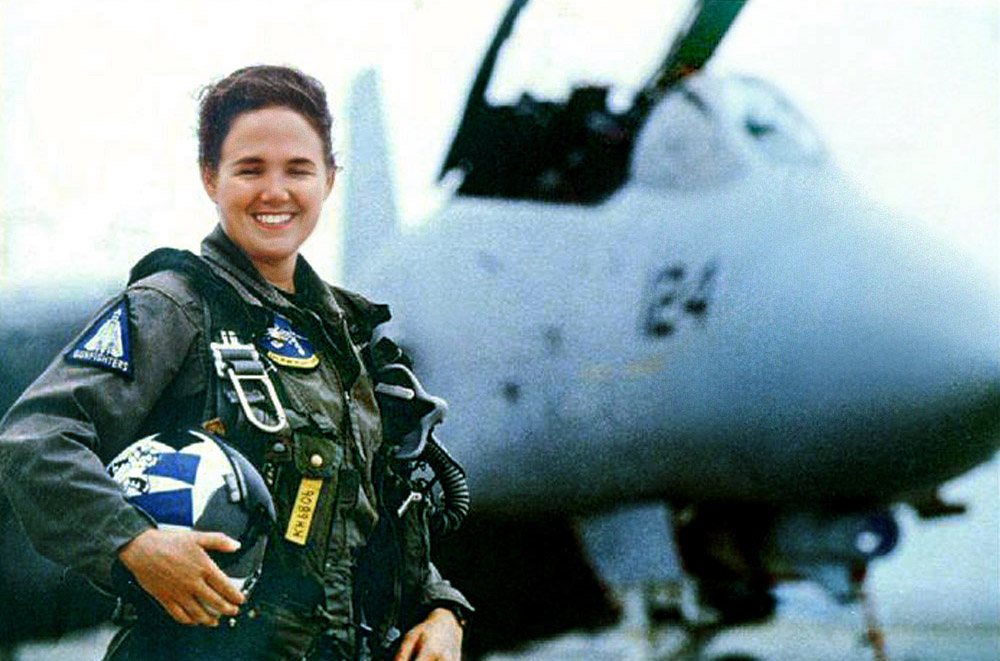
Lieutenant Kara Hultgreen, USN

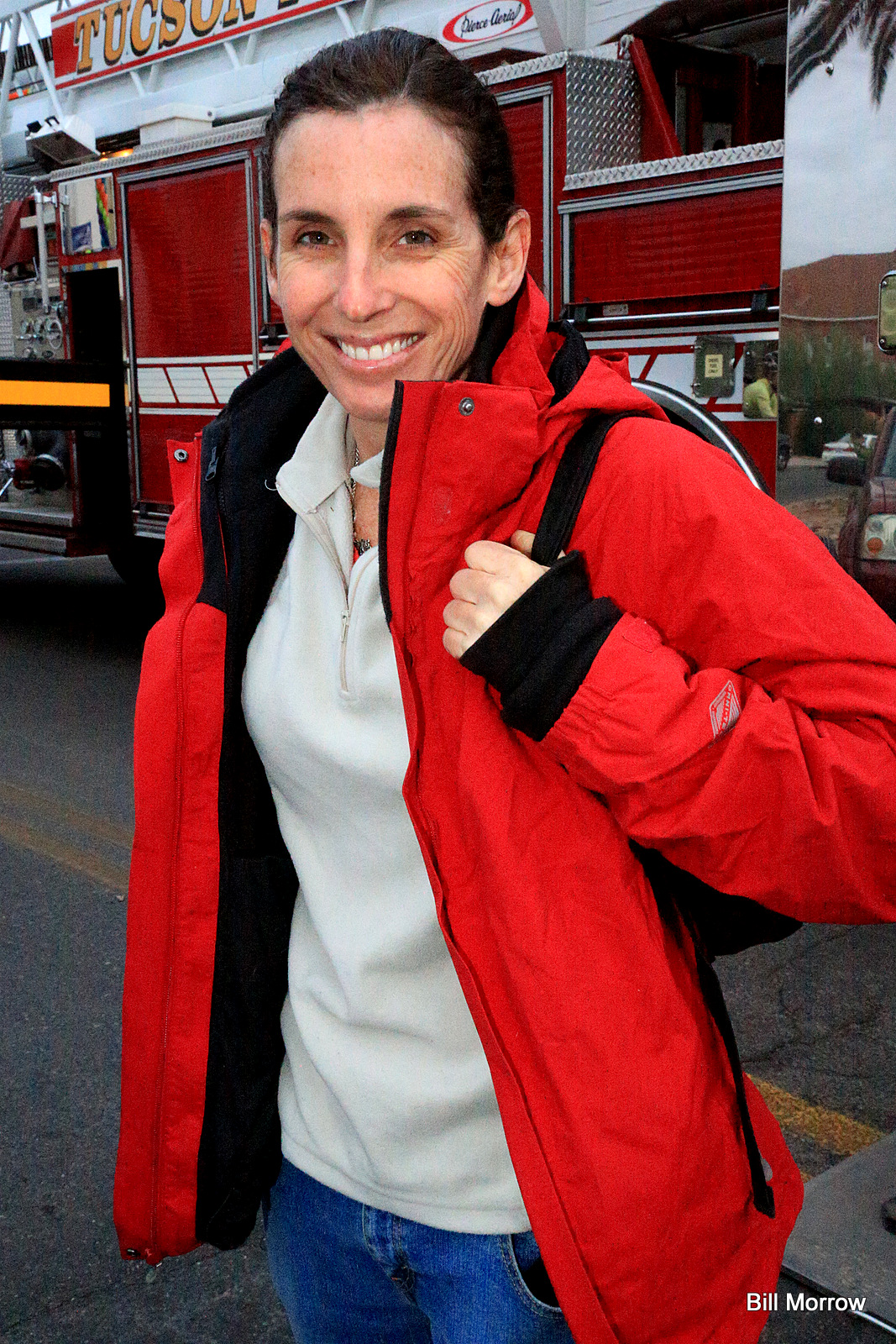
Col. Martha McSally, USAF (ret.)

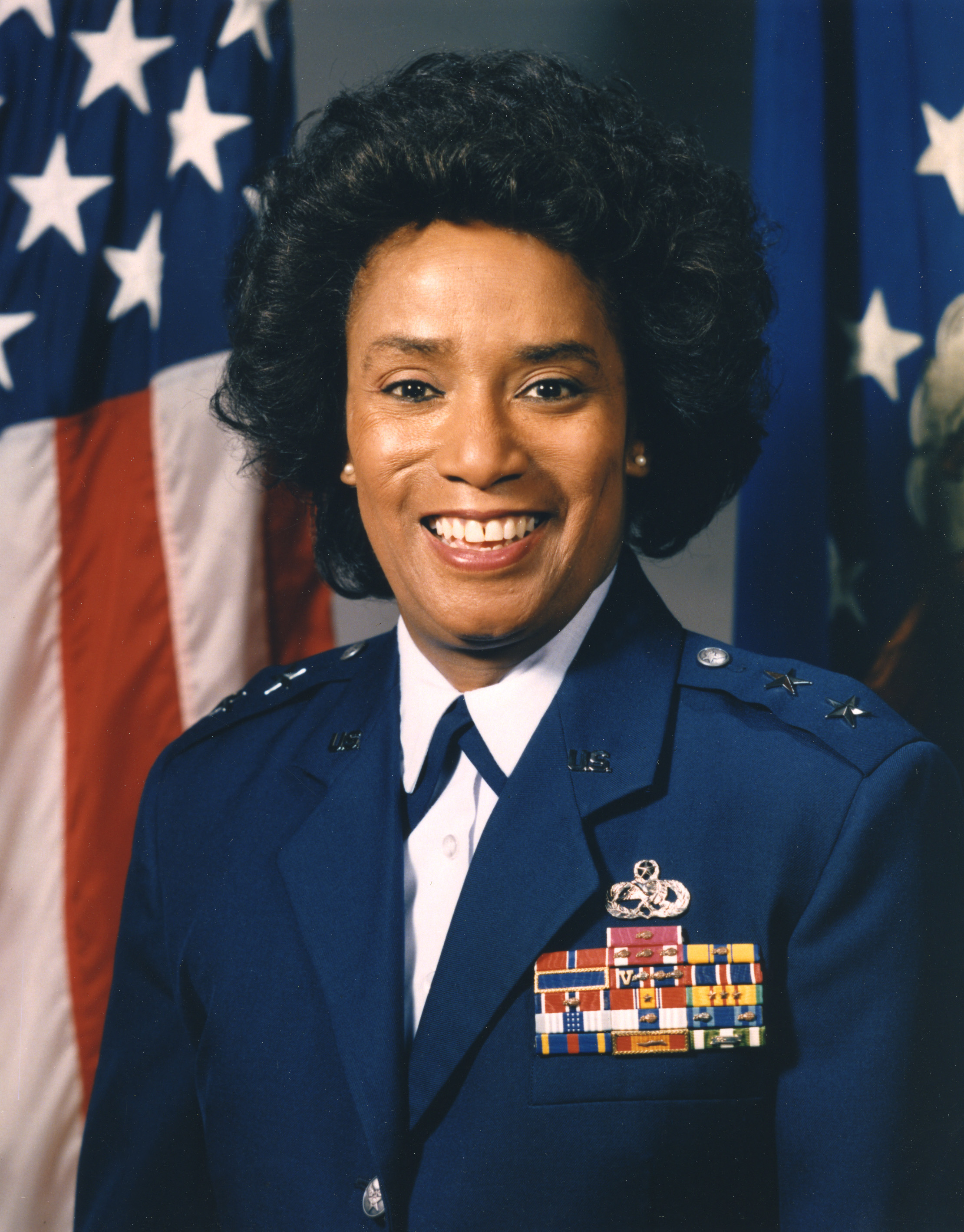
Major General Marcelite J. Harris, USAF (ret.)

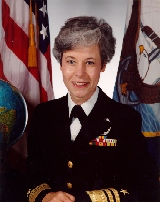
Vice Admiral Patricia Ann Tracey, USN (ret.)

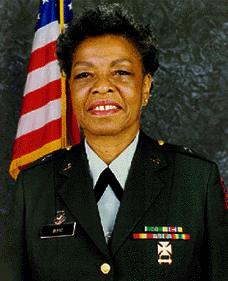
Major General Rosetta Burke, United States Army (ret.)

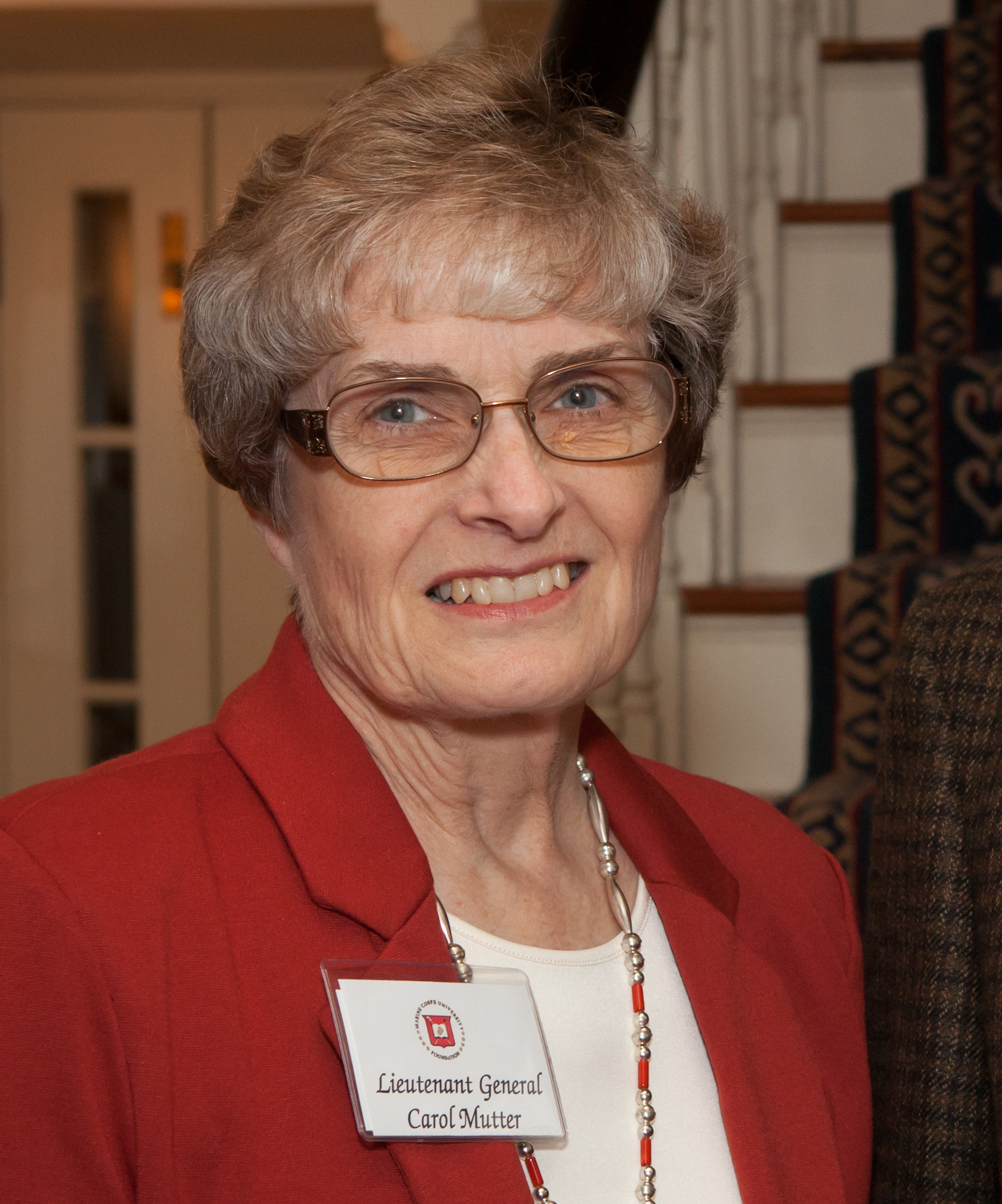
LtGen Carol Mutter, USMC (ret.)

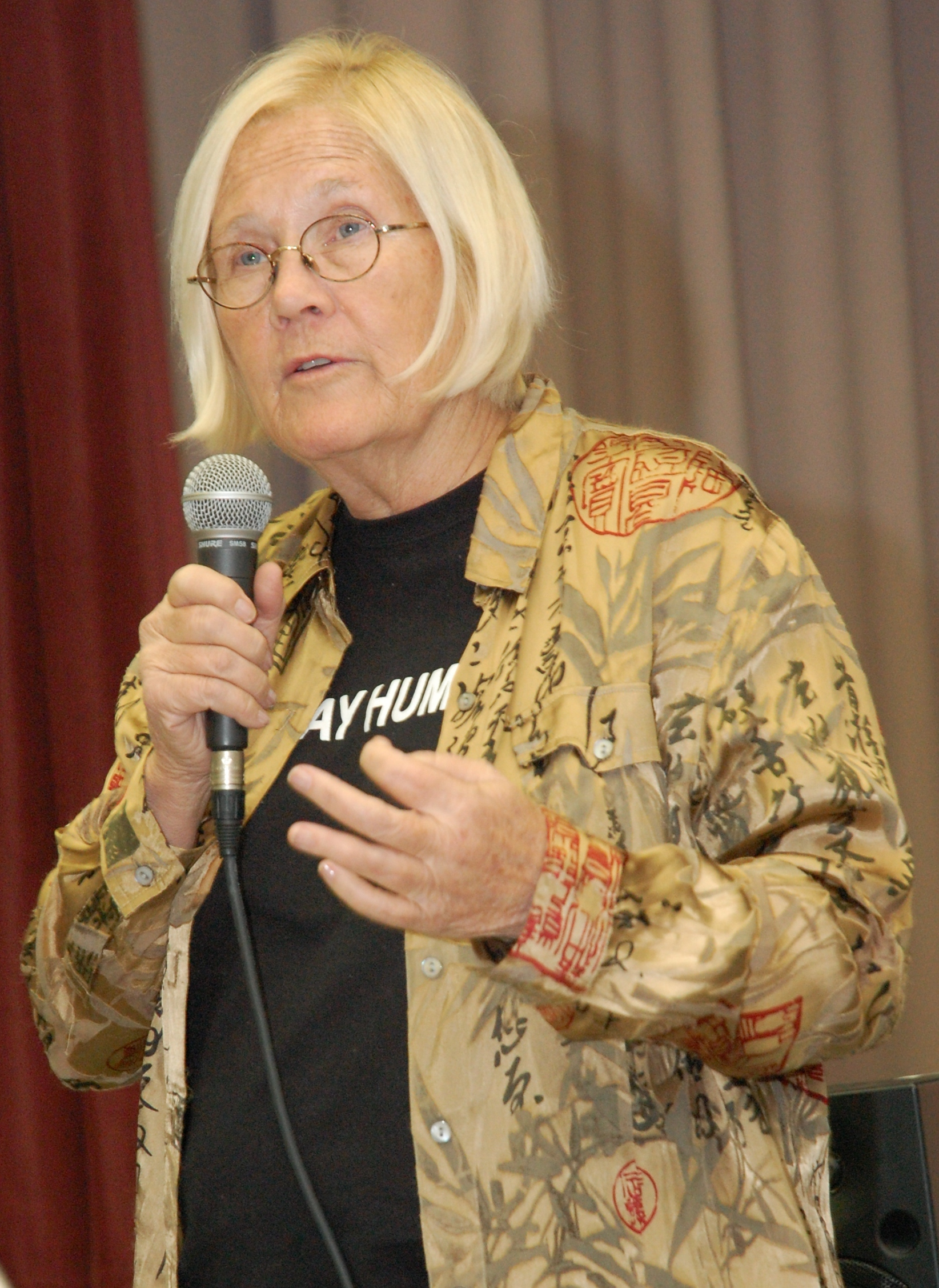
Colonel Ann Wright, United States Army (ret.)

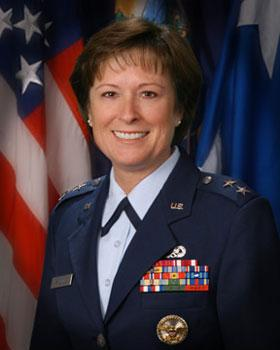
Major General Martha Rainville, USAF (ret.)

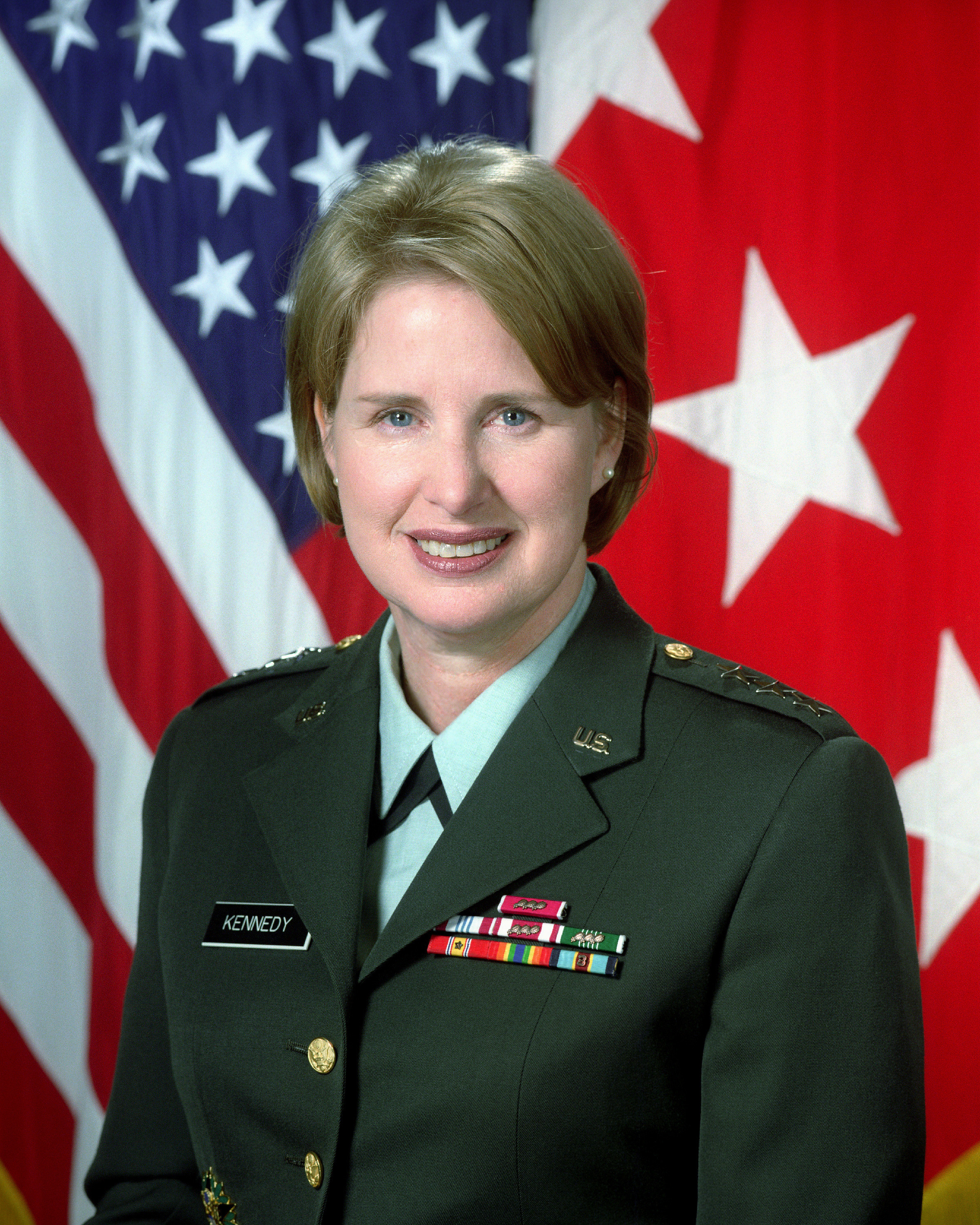
LTG Claudia J. Kennedy, United States Army, (ret.)

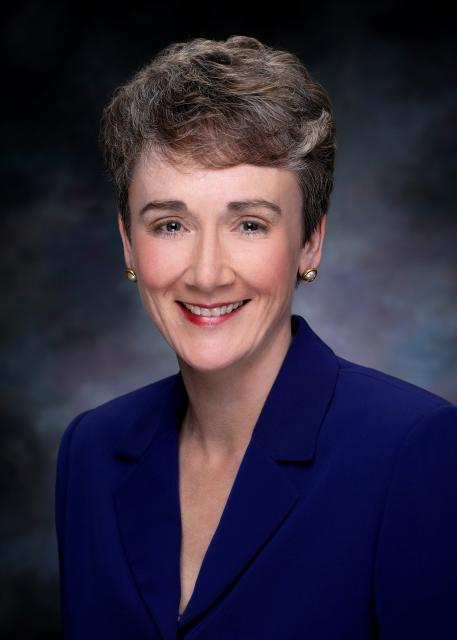
Captain Heather Wilson, USAF (ret.)

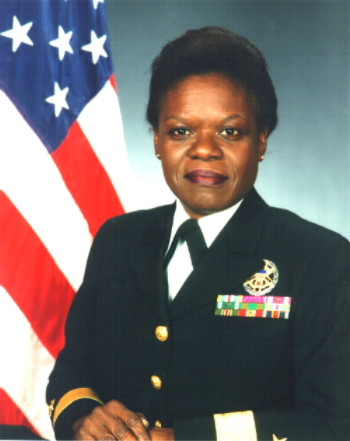
RDML Lillian E. Fishburne, USN (ret.)

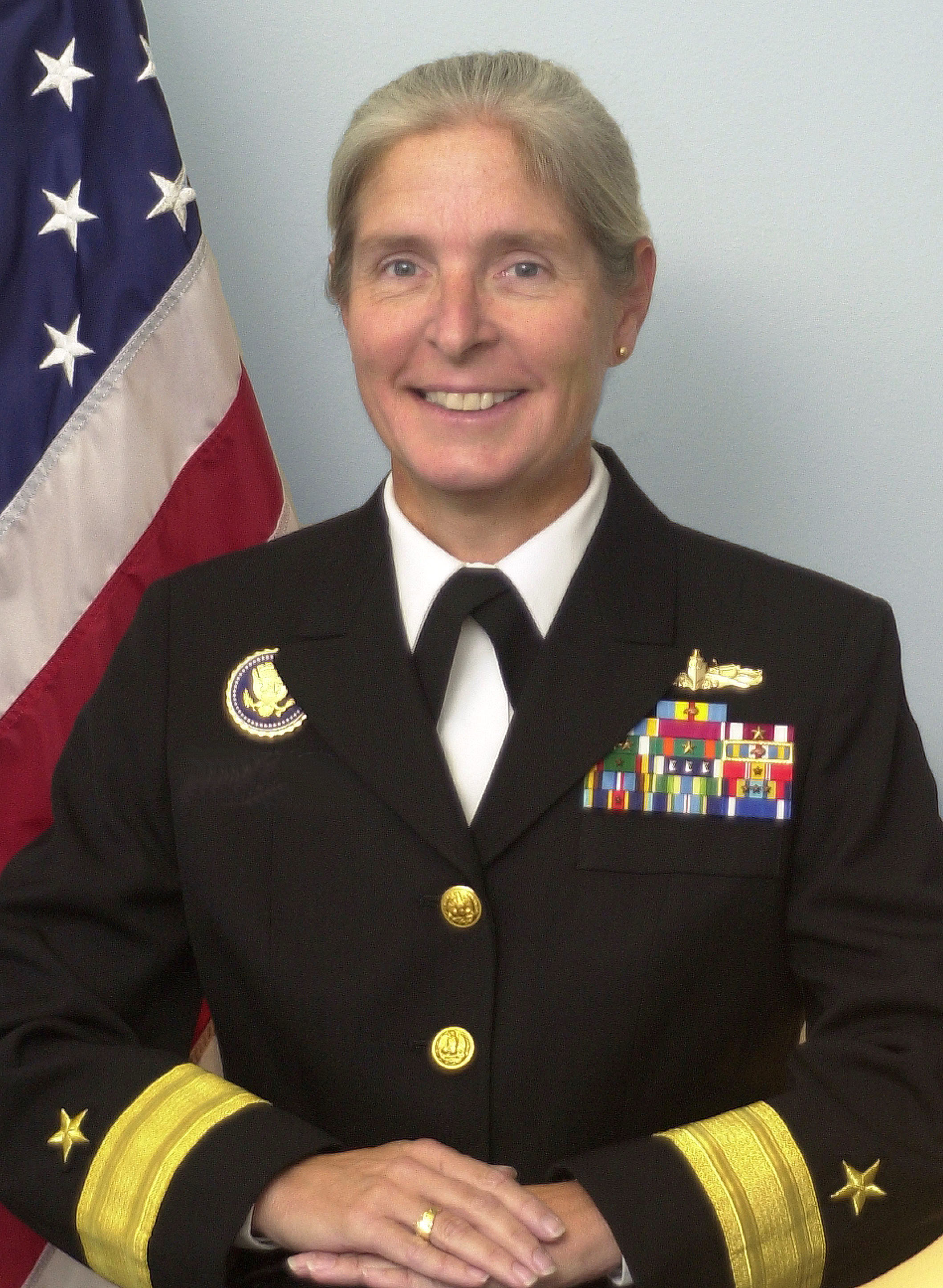
Rear Admiral (lower half) Deborah Loewer, USN (ret.)

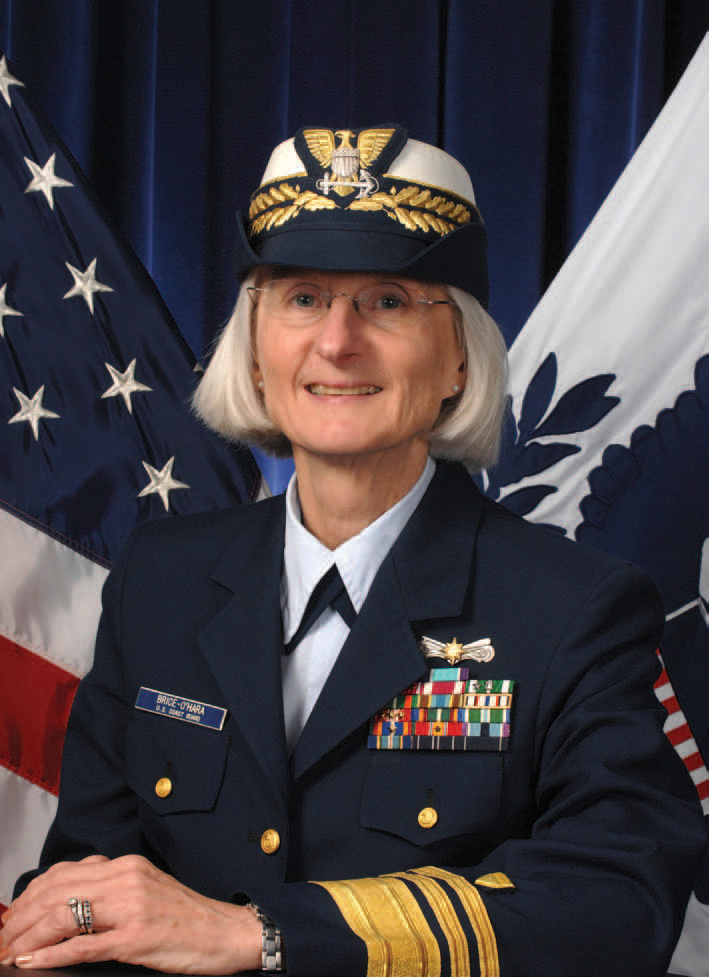
Vice Admiral Sally Brice-O'Hara, USCG (ret.)

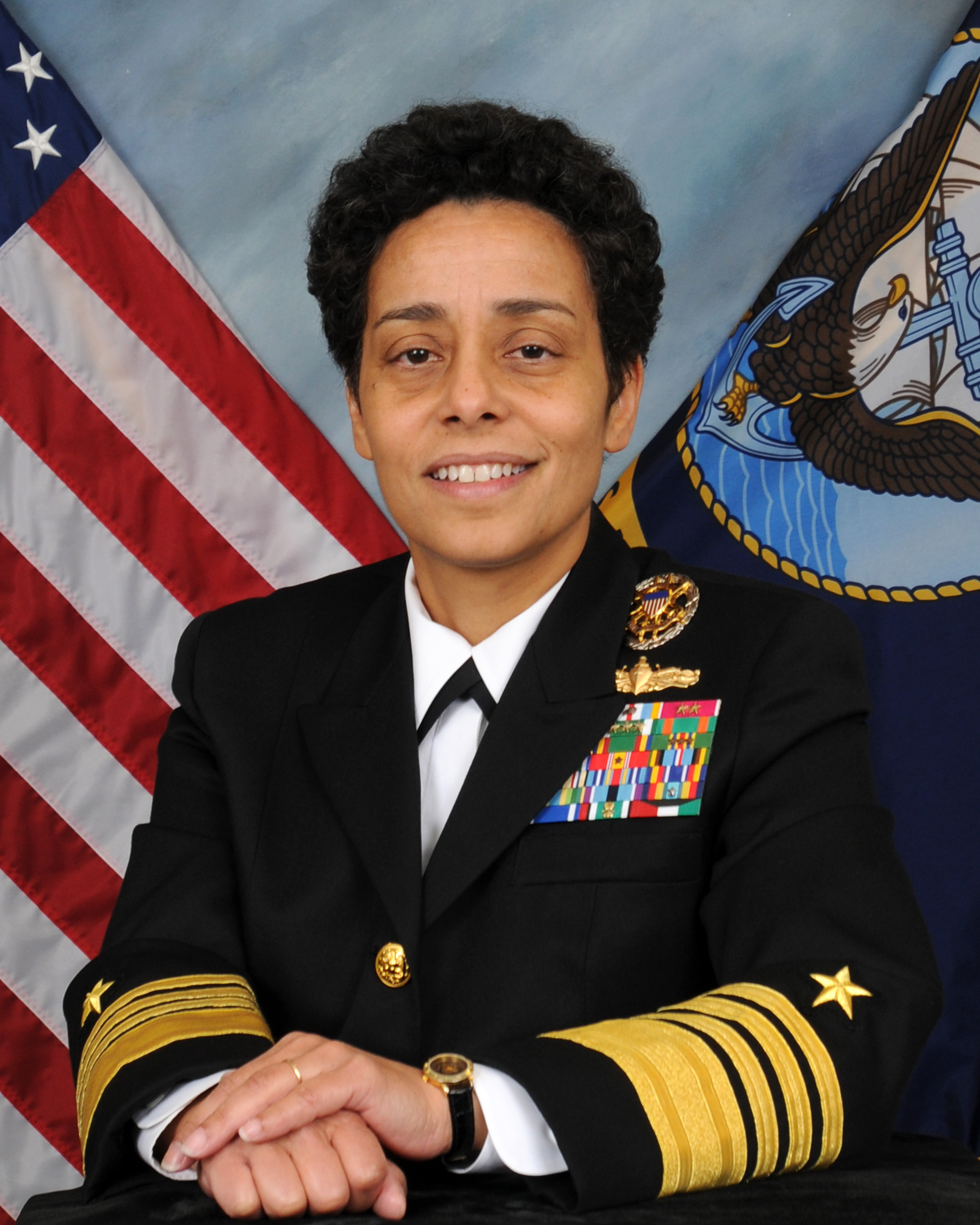
Admiral Michelle Howard, USN.

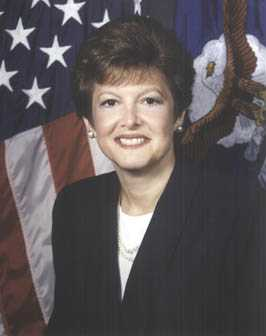
Major Carol A. DiBattiste, USAF (ret.)

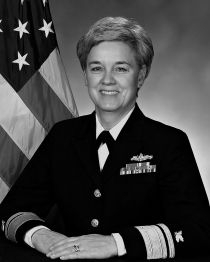
Rear Admiral (Lower Half) Linda J. Bird, USN (ret.)

== 1950s ==
- 1950-1953: (Korean War): Women who were in the Reserves were recalled to active duty. More than 500 Army nurses served in various areas and theaters of the war.
- Captain Lillian Kinkella Keil, USAF, who had already made 250 evacuation flights (23 of which were transatlantic) during World War II, made 175 evacuation flights during the Korean War. As a result, she became one of the most decorated women in American military history.

=== 1950 ===
- Ruby Bradley served in the Korean War as Chief Nurse for the 171st Evacuation Hospital. In November 1950, during the Chinese counter-offensive, she refused to leave until she had loaded the sick and wounded onto a plane in Pyongyang while surrounded by 100,000 advancing Chinese soldiers. She was able to jump aboard the plane just as her ambulance exploded from an enemy shell. In 1951, she was named Chief Nurse for the Eighth Army, where she supervised over 500 Army nurses throughout Korea. When she left Korea in June 1953, she was given a full-dress honor guard ceremony, the first woman ever to receive a national or international guard salute.
- Christena Ogle became the first Women's Air Force Airman assigned to the ranks of the United States Air Force Security Service.
- Edith DeVoe became the first African-American Navy nurse to serve outside the continental U.S., at Tripler Army Medical Center in Hawaii.

=== 1951 ===
- Defense Department Advisory Committee on Women in the Services (DACOWITS) is established to aid in recruitment of women serving in the military for the Korean War.
- President Truman authorized the Services to involuntarily discharge women due to pregnancy or adoption of minor children. Rule also permitted a voluntary discharge to uniformed women for marriage. Rule did not authorize uniformed women any entitlements due to family ("dependents") status, such as non-military spouses.
- Arie Taylor became the first black person to be a U.S. Women's Air Force classroom instructor.
- Helen E. Myers of Lancaster, Pa., a 1941 graduate of Temple University, is commissioned as the U.S. Army Dental Corps’ first woman dental officer in 1951.

=== 1952 ===
- U.S. Navy women were accepted for commission in the U.S. Medical Service Corps.

=== 1953 ===
- 7 August: Barbara O. Barnwell became the first female Marine awarded the Navy and Marine Corps Medal, which she was awarded on August 7, 1953, for saving a fellow Marine from drowning.
- Mercedes O. Cubria, a WAC, was promoted to major and deployed to Japan, where she continued to work in military intelligence. When the Korean War ended in 1953 Cubria was given a medical discharge, and was awarded the Bronze Star Medal for "meritorious achievement in ground operations against the enemy".
- Raya Rachlin became the first woman commissioned as an Air Force dentist.

=== 1955 ===
- 3 January - Irene O. Galloway was sworn in as the fourth director of the Women's Army Corps.
- Clotilde Dent Bowen became the U.S. Army's first black female physician to attain the rank of colonel.

=== 1957 ===
- MAJ Emma Baird became Assistant Chief, Personnel Branch and was reputed to be the first woman staff officer at the U.S. Military Academy.
- Mary Louise Rasmuson became the director of the Women's Army Corps.

=== 1958 ===
- Elizabeth Splaine became the first U.S. Coast Guard SPAR to be promoted to warrant officer.

=== 1959 ===
- 16 December: Anna Der-Vartanian became the U.S. Navy's first female master chief petty officer; this made her the first female master chief in the Navy, as well as the first female E-9 in the entire U.S. Armed Services. She received a personal letter from then-President Dwight D. Eisenhower congratulating her on her accomplishment.

== 1960s ==
- Wilma L. Vaught became the first woman to deploy with a Strategic Air Command operational unit.

=== 1960 ===
- According to scholars, since at least as early as 1960, Executive Order 10450 was applied to ban transgender individuals from serving in the United States military.
- Master Gunnery Sergeant Geraldine M. Moran became the first female Marine to be promoted to E-9.
- Grace Peterson became the first female chief master sergeant in the U.S. Air Force.

=== 1961 ===
- The first female U.S. Marine is promoted to Sergeant Major (Bertha Peters Billeb).
- Lieutenant Charlene I. Suneson became the first line WAVES officer to be ordered to shipboard duty.

=== 1962 ===
- Pearl Faurie became the first SPAR in the U.S. Coast Guard advanced to E-9.
- Captain Ruth Alice Erickson, USN, a witness to the attack on attack on Pearl Harbor, became Director of the United States Navy Nurse Corps.
- Mercedes O. Cubria was recalled to service by the U.S. Army as a result of the Cuban Missile Crisis. She worked primarily in the role of de-briefing Cuban refugees, as well as defectors who were fleeing the Cuban communist regime. She also helped the refugees find jobs and places to live. Cubria's work with the refugees proved to be a significant asset to the United States Army and the Central Intelligence Agency. Cubria was awarded the Legion of Merit and continued to serve for the next eleven years.
- Catherine G. Murray became the first female enlisted Marine to retire from active duty.
- Eleanor Ardel Vietti became America’s first woman prisoner of war in Vietnam. She is currently the only American woman unaccounted for from the Vietnam War.

=== 1964 ===
- Alice K. Kurashige became the first Japanese-American woman to be commissioned in the United States Marine Corps.

=== 1965 ===
- 1965-1975: Vietnam War: Around 7,000 American military women serve in Southeast Asia. Nurses serve aboard the hospital ship USS Sanctuary. Nine non-nurse U.S. Navy women serve in country; however no enlisted Navy women are authorized. LT Elizabeth G. Wylie became the first woman to serve in Vietnam on the staff of Commander, Naval Forces, Saigon. Barbara Annette Robbins is the first American woman to die in the Vietnam War; she is a secretary for the CIA, and is the first woman at the CIA killed in the line of duty, as well as the youngest CIA employee ever killed. She dies in a car bombing at the U.S. Embassy in Vietnam in 1965, at the age of 21. Pat Foote became the first female public relations officer in Vietnam in 1967. First LT Sharon Ann Lane is the only US military woman to die from enemy fire in Vietnam. Captain Mary Therese Klinker dies during a rescue operation. Six other American military women die in the line of duty - Eleanor Grace Alexander, Pamela Dorothy Donovan, Carol Ann Drazba, Annie Ruth Graham, Elizabeth Ann Jones, and Hedwig Diane Orlowski. Two Army nurses are awarded the Soldier's Medal for heroism in Vietnam; one is African-American 1LT Diane Lindsay. CDR Elizabeth Barrett was the highest-ranking female naval line officer to serve in Vietnam and the first woman to hold command in a combat zone.
- CWO3 Rose Franco was the first Hispanic woman to become a Chief Warrant Officer in the U.S. Marine Corps.
- The U.S. Marine Corps assigns its first woman to attaché duty. Later, she is the first female Marine to serve under hostile fire.

=== 1966 ===
- Army nurse Second Lieutenant Carol Ann Drazba became the first American nurse to die in the Vietnam War; Drazba, 22, and six others died on February 18, 1966, in a helicopter crash in southern Vietnam. There is a statue in her honor in Scranton, Pennsylvania.

=== 1967 ===
- Pat Foote became the first female public relations officer in Vietnam in 1967.
- Barbara Dulinsky became the first female United States Marine to serve in a combat zone.
- * President Johnson signs Public Law 90-130; it removed legal ceilings on women's promotions that had kept them out of the general and flag ranks, and dropped the two percent ceiling on officer and enlisted strengths for women in the armed forces.

=== 1968 ===
- Dr. Betsy Lewis, the Academy fine arts librarian, became the first female faculty member at West Point when she begins teaching art classes in the English Department to First Class cadets.
- Ruth A. Lucas became the first African-American woman to attain the rank of colonel in the U.S. Air Force.
- Women are sworn into the Air National Guard (ANG).
- Lieutenant Colonel Jenny Wren is the first female U.S Marine to attend Command and Staff College.

=== 1969 ===
- 3 January - Barbara J. Bishop became the 5th director of the women Marines.
- May - Marcelite J. Harris became the first woman maintenance officer in the USAF.
- Air Force Reserve Officers Training Corps (AFROTC) opens to women.
- Temple University admits and trains the first 8 women in Army ROTC due to "an error in the academic advising office."
- Jeanette I. Sustad became the director of the Women Marines, and remains such until was succeeded by Margaret A. Brewer in 1973.

== 1970s ==
- Late 1970s: Women first served in "topside" roles at the American missile alert facilities, such as maintenance and security, beginning in the late 1970s.

=== 1970 ===
- Anna Mae Hays, Chief of the Army Nurse Corps, became the first U.S. female brigadier general on June 11, 1970. Minutes later, Elizabeth Hoisington, Director of the Women's Army Corps, became the second.
- 1st Lt Patricia Murphy was named the first female U.S. Marine certified military judge.

=== 1971 ===
- Mildred Inez Caroon Bailey became the director of the Women's Army Corps.
- The Air Force promoted the director of Air Force women, Jeanne Holm, as its first female brigadier general.
- Jane Leslie Holly, an Auburn University alumni, became the first woman to graduate from the AFROTC commissioning source.

=== 1972 ===
- January: Commander Elizabeth Barrett arrived in Vietnam, and was the highest ranking female naval line officer in Vietnam. By November 1972, she had become the first female commander in a combat zone, leading the 450 enlisted men in the [U.S.] Naval Advisory Group, a position she held until she left Vietnam in March 1973.
- 28 March: The House introduces a bill to allow the appointment of women to "any military service academy" though the bill fails.
- July: Terry Jo Schorsch and three other female sailors became the first women to become coxswains in the regular US Navy. Their first duty station was serving the USS Arizona Memorial at Pearl Harbor.
- August: Wilma L. Vaught became the first female Air Force officer to attend the Industrial College of the Armed Forces.
- Hospitalman Elena J. Peckenpaugh was assigned to the first U.S. Navy ship with a mixed male-female crew.
- The first women's Reserve Enlisted Basic Indoctrination classes in the U.S. Coast Guard were established in 1972.
- The U.S. Reserve Officer Training Corps (ROTC) allows Army and Navy women to join their ranks.
- Publication Z-116 about equal rights and opportunities for women in the Navy is written and published by the U.S. Chief of Naval Operations, Admiral Elmo R. Zumwalt.
- Concurrent with All Volunteer Force establishment, the U.S. Department of Defense authorized provisions to permit Services to retain uniformed mothers on a case-by-case basis.
- The Hospital Ship USS Sanctuary was the first U.S. Naval vessel to sail with a male/female crew.
- Alene Duerk became the first female admiral in the U.S. Navy.
- Mildred C. Kelly became the first African-American woman E9 (Sergeant Major) in the U.S. Armed Forces.
- Katherine Ravithis became the first woman to join the Colorado Army National Guard.

=== 1973 ===
- February: The first women since 1945 were admitted to Officer Candidate School in the Coast Guard.
- November 1: Enlistment of women in the Coast Guard was authorized for four-year tours of active duty under limited ratings.
- November 30: Kati Garner qualified as the Navy's first female SCUBA diver.
- Legislation ended the Coast Guard Women's Reserve and women were integrated into the active duty Coast Guard and the Coast Guard Reserve. On December 7, 1973 Wanda May Parr and Margaret A. Blackman became the first female enlistees sworn into the regular Coast Guard, and Alice T. Jefferson became the first female commissioned officer sworn into the regular Coast Guard.
- 1LT Virginia Fry became the first full-time female faculty member at West Point when she serves as a geography instructor in the Department of Earth, Space, and Graphic Sciences.
- Women's combat exclusion in the Coast Guard ends.
- Alice Jefferson became the first SPAR to be sworn into the regular Coast Guard.
- Lieutenants Victoria Voge and Jane McWilliams became the Navy's first two women flight surgeons.
- The first female enlistee was accepted into the regular Coast Guard on 7 December 1973.
- Gail Harris became the first female Intelligence Officer in a Navy aviation squadron in 1973.
- The first U.S. Navy women earn military pilot wings. LTJG Judith Neuffer had been the first woman selected for flight training in 1973.
- Women Officer School (WOS), Newport, Rhode Island, was disestablished, and Officer Candidate School (OCS) training was gender integrated to support men and women.
- Pregnancy as a reason for mandatory separation from the U.S. Navy was abolished. Women could now request to remain on active duty if pregnant.
- Janet Sebastian Cox became the first woman to join a Kauai unit of the Hawaii National Guard.
- The U.S. military accepts its first female chaplain (Dianna Pohlman Bell, in the Navy).
- The U.S. Supreme Court decides on Frontiero v. Richardson that women in the military were facing unequal benefits.

=== 1974 ===
- January 15: The first group of women ever enlisted as "Regulars" in the Coast Guard report to Cape May.
- Mixed-gender basic training begins in the Coast Guard.
- Eleanor L'Ecuyer became the first woman on active duty in the Coast Guard promoted to Captain since World War II.
- Faye Glenn Abdellah became the first nurse officer in the U.S. to receive the rank of a two-star rear admiral.
- June 4: Lieutenant Sally D. Murphy, the first woman to qualify as an aviator in the Army, became the first female U.S. Army aviator and U.S. Army helicopter pilot.
- First women commissioned through NROTC.
- The Navy became the first U.S. service to graduate a female pilot (LT Barbara Allen Rainey.) They graduated six in 1974.
- Alice Mae Henderson became the first black female chaplain in the armed forces and the first female chaplain in the Army.

=== 1975 ===
- March 14: Donna Tobias graduated from Second Class Dive School, thus becoming the Navy's first woman deep sea diver.
- May: 1st LT Jennifer Ferry became the first woman to complete basic training and enter the Army Nurse Corps at 7 months pregnant. No uniforms were available. Kathleen Byerly became the first female officer in the United States Navy to serve as the flag secretary to an admiral commanding an operational staff. She was one of 12 women named persons of the year by Time Magazine in 1975.
- November: New uniforms for women in the Coast Guard are approved. The uniform is designed by Edith Head, a Hollywood fashion expert.
- 1975-1980: Project Athena conducted at West Point. This joint Military Academy-Army Research Institute effort was one of the nation's first systematic studies of the integration of women into an all-male institution.
- U.S. Navy women were assigned to service craft (e.g., tug boats).
- The term Woman Marine is discontinued; all women in the U.S. Marine Corps are considered Marines. Women are allowed in every occupation or billet in the U.S. Marine Corps except Infantry, Artillery, and pilot-aircrew, because of general service restrictions.
- Fifteen sea intensive ratings were closed to women in the U.S. Navy.
- The U.S. Navy begins screening URL women for CDR, CO, and LCDR XO billets ashore.
- Schlesinger v. Ballard, 419 U.S. 498 (1975), was a United States Supreme Court case that upheld a federal statute granting female Naval officers four more years of commissioned service before mandatory discharge than male Naval officers. A federal statute granted female Naval officers thirteen years of commissioned service while allowing only nine years of commissioned service for male Naval officers before mandatory discharge due to not being promoted. The Supreme Court held that the law passed intermediate scrutiny equal protection analysis because women, excluded from combat duty, had fewer opportunities for advancement in the military. The Court found the statute to directly compensate for the past statutory barriers to advancement.

=== 1976 ===
- 1 January: All aviation ratings in the Coast Guard open to women.
- Debra Chambers Buchanan and Debra Lee Wilson became the first women to serve as coxswains in the Coast Guard.
- The United States Air Force Academy, United States Coast Guard Academy, United States Military Academy and the United States Naval Academy became coeducational. USAF eliminates the WAF program; with women more fully integrated with men in the service it is considered unnecessary. 119 women became the first women cadets at West Point when they joined the Class of 1980.
- Women are allowed to train as jet fighter pilots in the U.S. Air Force.
- At the end of 1976, Gail Harris was requested by name to report to Kamiseya, Japan, to the Fleet Ocean Surveillance Information Facility and became the first female and first African American female to be designated an Intelligence Watch Specialist in the U.S. Navy, as an Intelligence Watch Officer.
- Mrs. Sue Peterson became the first female instructor in the Department of Physical Education at West Point.
- The U.S. Navy promoted a female line officer, Fran McKee, to flag rank in 1976. RADM McKee thus became the first Navy woman who was not a nurse to achieve star rank, as well as the first female unrestricted line officer appointed to flag rank.
- Women began attending U.S. Navy Aviation Officer Candidate School.
- 2nd Circuit Court decision indicating involuntary pregnancy discharges in the U.S. Navy violated the 5th Amendment.

=== 1977 ===
- Women Airforce Service Pilots (WASP) are given military veteran status.
- The first mixed-gender crews afloat in the Coast Guard occurred in October, 1977 when 24 women reported on board the CGCs Gallatin and Morgenthau as members of their permanent crew. Twelve women—two officers and 10 enlisted—served on board each.
- Janna Lambine became the first woman to be designated as a Coast Guard aviator.
- Connie Swaro became the first active-duty female in the Coast Guard promoted to E-7 on 1 August 1977.
- Cheryl Stearns is the first woman member of the Golden Knights, the Army's elite parachute team. She served two 3-year tours with them.

=== 1978 ===
- All officer career fields and enlisted ratings in the Coast Guard opened to women.
- Margaret A. Brewer, Director of Information and former Director of Women Marines, became the first woman to reach the rank of general in the United States Marine Corps, as she is promoted to brigadier general.
- The CBS made-for-television movie "Women at West Point" airs.
- MAJ Nancy Freebairn became the first female tactical officer at West Point.
- The women's basketball team called the "Sugar Smacks," the first women's team to gain varsity status at West Point, finishes its initial varsity year with an 18–5 record.
- The U.S. Air Force Strategic Air Command (SAC) assigns the first woman aircrew member to alert duty.
- Under Owens v. Brown, Judge John Sirica declares that it is unconstitutional to ban Navy women from ships. Congress approves a change to Title 10 USC Section 6015 to permit the Navy to assign women to fill sea duty billets on support and noncombatant ships.
- Surface Warfare and Special Operations communities in the Navy were opened to women.
- SKCM Margaret I. Gramlich became the first woman assigned to a Command Master Chief ashore billet in the U.S. Navy.
- Navy Nurse Joan C. Bynum became the first black woman promoted to the rank of captain in the U.S. Navy.
- The Women's Army Corps (WAC) is disestablished and members are integrated into the Army.
- Patricia Fornes, as a first lieutenant, was the first woman officer to serve on a combat missile crew at a Titan II facility.
- Mary E. Clarke became the first female major general in the U.S. Army.

=== 1979 ===
- 21 June: SN Ina J. Toays became the first woman to be awarded the Coast Guard Medal.
- 27 November: Lieutenant Marcella A. Hayes became the first African-American female military aviator and U.S. Army helicopter pilot.
- Kathy Gerard became the first female Brigade Executive Officer at West Point.
- Pat Foote became the first female faculty member of the U.S. Army War School.
- COL Mildred Hedbergb became Chief of Staff, USCC, at West Point.
- The women's swimming team at West Point finished its first varsity season undefeated and captured the New York State AIAW Division B Swimming Varsity Championship.
- Beverly Kelley takes command of the CGC Cape Newagan, which makes her the first female commanding Coast Guard officer afloat.
- LT Kay Hartzell takes command of the LORAN station in Lampedusa, making her the first woman commanding officer of an isolated Coast Guard station.
- Sandra Ward West was the first female C-130 Flight Engineer.
- Second woman to make BM1 in the Coast Guard: Debra Chambers Buchanan.
- Cadet 1/c Linda Johansen became the first woman to win Corps command at any service academy.
- Gail Harris became the first female and African American instructor at the Armed Forces Air Intelligence Training Center at Lowry Air Force Base, Colorado.
- Hazel Johnson-Brown was promoted to brigadier general in 1979, making her the first black woman general officer in the history of the US military and the first black Chief of the Army Nurse Corps. She was also the first Chief holding an earned doctorate.
- The U.S. Naval Flight Officer (NFO) program opened to women.
- The first woman U.S. Naval aviator obtains carrier qualification (LT Lynn Spruill.)
- The first woman obtained Surface Warfare Officer (SWO) qualification in the U.S. Navy.
- First year the United States Navy advertises for "qualified female volunteers to over-winter in Antarctica."

== 1980s ==
=== 1980 ===
- September 8: Wilma L. Vaught became the first woman promoted to brigadier general in the comptroller career field.
- Brenda Robinson became the first African American female pilot in the U.S Navy to earn her wings.
- The first classes with women graduated from the United States Air Force Academy, United States Coast Guard Academy, United States Military Academy, and the United States Naval Academy. Jean M. Butler is the first woman to graduate from the Coast Guard Academy; and later, thirteen other women graduate as part of class of 1980. Sixty two women graduate West Point with the Class of 1980. Andrea Hollen, who was the first woman to graduate West Point, was also the Academy's first woman to win a Rhodes Scholarship. Elizabeth Anne Rowe is the first woman to graduate from the U.S. Naval Academy. Janie Mines is the first African-American female graduate of the U.S. Naval Academy. Kathleen Conley was the first to graduate the Air Force Academy, and later returned to the Academy as an instructor. Linda Garcia Cubero was a member of the first class of women to graduate from the United States Air Force Academy. She was the first Hispanic woman to graduate from any service academy.
- Eleanor Judge became MCB Camp Pendleton's first female sergeant major.
- The first woman is assigned to command a U.S. Naval Training Command (CAPT Roberta L. Hazard.)
- The first women joined the U.S. Navy band.
- MAJ Cathy Kelly became the U.S. Military Academy's first female Permanent Associate Professor when she was named a professor in the Department of Geography and Computer Science.
- The first woman was selected for the Limited Duty Officer (LDO) program in the U.S. Navy.

=== 1981 ===
- 1 September: Connie Swaro became the first active-duty woman in the Coast Guard to be promoted to E-8.
- Sandra L. Hinds (unknown tribal affiliation) became the first Native American woman to graduate from the United States Naval Academy.
- Bonnie Koppell became the first female rabbi to serve in the U.S. military; she joined the army reserves in 1978 while a rabbinical student at the Reconstructionist Rabbinical College in Philadelphia, Pennsylvania, and was ordained in 1981.
- Lieutenant Colleen Cain became the first woman Coast Guard aviator to qualify as an HH-52 co-pilot, pilot and aircraft commander.
- Michelle D. Johnson became the first woman to hold the position of Cadet Wing Commander at the United States Air Force Academy, and the first woman to hold the senior-ranking cadet position at any of the U.S. military academies.
- Dena Caradimitropoulo became the first woman and only the sixth cadet at West Point to win the AAA Special Award for "outstanding achievements and exemplary leadership in athletic competition."
- Kim Hall became the first woman at West Point to score 1,000 points in her basketball career.
- YN2 Angela Purdy was selected as the first female Sailor of the Year at sea in the U.S. Navy, while serving on board the USS Emory S. Land (AS-39).
- Olga E. Custodio qualified for Undergraduate Pilot Training (UPT) at Laughlin Air Force Base in Texas and graduated in 1981, thus becoming the first Latina to complete the U.S. Air Force military pilot training.
- Capt. Kathleen Wilder became the first woman to qualify for the Special Forces. She was told she had failed a field exercise just before graduation, but she filed a sex discrimination complaint, and it was determined that she "had been wrongly denied graduation."

=== 1982 ===
- November: Marcelite J. Harris became the first woman to be the Director of Maintenance for the Air Force
- Lieutenant Colleen Cain became the first woman in the Coast Guard killed in the line of duty.
- Dolores K. Smith (Cherokee) became the first Native American woman to graduate from the United States Air Force Academy.
- Barbara Allen Rainey became the first U.S. female aviator to be killed during a routine flight in 1982.
- The U.S. Air Force selects the first woman aviator for Test Pilot School.

=== 1983 ===
- Jacqueline A. Ball and Deborah R. Winnie were the first Hispanic women to graduate from the Coast Guard Academy.
- AD3 Carolyn DeLeo is the first woman in the Coast Guard to be awarded the Air Medal.
- The Women's Swimming Team at West Point wins the inaugural ECAC Swimming Championship.
- The first Navy woman completes Test Pilot School.
- Around 200 U.S. Army and Air Force women are deployed to Grenada during Operation Urgent Fury.
- LT Susan Cowar became the first woman SWO screened for XO afloat in the Navy.
- Commodore Grace Hopper was the first woman spot promoted to Flag rank in the Restricted Line in the U.S. Navy.
- LTJG Jannine Weiss was the U.S. Navy's first LDO pilot.

=== 1984 ===
- Linda Moroz is the first woman to complete U.S. Navy Dive School.
- First Native American woman to graduate from West Point: Brigitte T. Wahwassuck (unknown tribal affiliation).
- Vivien Crea became the first Coast Guard female officer assigned as a Military Aide to the President.
- Connie Swaro is the first active-duty woman to graduate from the CPO Academy in the Coast Guard.
- Karen Short became the first woman Regimental Commander and the first woman to command Cadet Basic Training (CBT) at West Point.
- Pam Pearson is the first West Point cadet to win all-America honors in women's basketball.
- Tracy Hanlon became the first female West Point cadet to qualify for Olympic trials.
- Kristine Holderied became the first woman to graduate first in her class at the Naval Academy.
- All Operational Air Reconnaissance (VP) squadrons in the U.S. Navy opened to women.
- Barbara Cogburn became the first school-trained female primary marksmanship instructor (PMI) with Weapons and Field Training Battalion (WFTBn) at Edson Range, MCB Camp Pendleton.

=== 1985 ===
- March: Catherine Small Long became the first female veteran to be elected to Congress.
- 3 June: LTJG Vickie Karnes and LTJG Cathy Bierne fly the first SAR mission flown by two woman pilots.
- Sherian Grace Cadoria is the first black woman promoted to brigadier general in the regular Army. When she retired in 1990, she was the highest ranking black woman in the entire military.
- Carmelita Vigil-Schimmenti became the first Hispanic female in the United States military to attain the rank of general.
- The US Postal Service issued a stamp honoring Mary McLeod Bethune, an educator and civil rights activist, who pressured U.S. Army leaders to allow black women in the WAAC/WAC during World War II. She assisted in the selection of the first black WAAC officer candidates.
- Denise Matthews graduates first in her class at the Coast Guard Academy and is the first woman to make this accomplishment.
- Lissa Young became the first female Deputy Brigade Commander and the first woman to command Cadet Field Training (CFT) at West Point.
- Leslie Lewis became the first female West Point cadet to win a Marshall Scholarship and a Phi Kappa Phi Scholarship.
- Gail M. Reals became the first woman promoted to general through the U.S. Marine Corps ranks. Margaret A. Brewer had received her star in 1978 by special appointment from President Jimmy Carter and approval of both houses of Congress.
- CDR Veronica "Ronne" Froman, first woman assigned as XO of a U.S. Naval Station.
- Michelle Manning became the first female commanding officer of Headquarters and Headquarters Squadron, Marine Corps Air Station Camp Pendleton.

=== 1986 ===
- Kelly Mogk Larson is the first female rescue swimmer.
- First woman promoted to CWO (PERS) in the Coast Guard: Pamela Jones.
- Pam Pearson became the first female West Point cadet to win All-America recognition in two sports (basketball and track).
- First female MSTC in the Coast Guard: Lia deBettencourt, 1986.
- Rabbi Julie Schwartz became the first woman to serve as an active-duty Jewish chaplain in the U.S. Navy.
- The First Recruiting District in the U.S. Navy had women as both CO and XO.
- LT Susan Cowar, SPECOPS officer, became the first woman SWO assigned as XO afloat in the U.S. Navy. SPECOPS officers also had to complete SWO qualifications.)
- Rhonda LeBrescu Amtower was the first enlisted female U.S. Marine to attend and graduate the Defense Language Institute, where she studied Mandarin Chinese. After being commissioned she was the first female attaché at the U. S. Hong Kong consulate in 1986.
- Pat Foote became the first female inspector general in the Army.

=== 1987 ===
- The Combat Exclusion Law of the United States banning women from warships is lifted.
- LT Monyee Kazek and LT Jody Turner became the first female EOs of a Coast Guard cutter.
- CDR Rosemary Bryant Mariner became the first woman screened for command of an aviation unit in the U.S. Navy.
- First woman in the Coast Guard promoted to CWO (F&S): Ellen Terrill.
- First woman in the Coast Guard promoted to CWO (MED): Connie Swaro.
- CPTs Kathy Gerard Snook and Bobbi Fiedler-Prinslow (both USMA '80) became the first female graduates to serve as USMA faculty members when they both joined the Department of Mathematics.
- Deborah Hanagan is the first female West Point cadet to win an Olmstead Scholarship.
- Ann Marie Wycoff wins the first national title by a female West Point cadet in capturing the 400-yard Individual Medley and leads the women's swimming team to a record-breaking fifth-place finish at the NCAA Division II Championships.
- Teresa Sobiesk became the first female West Point cadet in cross country history to win all-America recognition.
- The U.S. Air National Guard promoted its first female African-American general officer in 1987 - Air Force nurse Irene Trowell-Harris.

=== 1988 ===
- LT Samone Vassa is the first woman appointed as Coast Guard Flight Officer (NFO).
- First African-American woman/first female engineer in the Coast Guard advanced to E-7: Pamela Autry.
- First Asian American female warrant officer in the Coast Guard: Grace Parmelee.
- Christine Siegworth became the first female West Point cadet to win a National Science Foundation Fellowship.
- The women's cross country team at West Point captures ECAC and NCAA East Coast Regional Division II Championship in qualifying for its first NCAA Division I bid. Three women win All-America honors including a second for Teresa Sobiesk.
- Ann Marie Wycoff is named the "Outstanding Female Swimmer" at the NCAA Division II Championships and became the first Army athlete to capture four national titles at a single championship event.
- Kathryn D. Sullivan is the first Navy woman to become an astronaut.
- CDR Debra Gernes was first woman selected for command at sea in the U.S. Navy.
- Twenty-four Combat Logistics Force (CLF) ships open to women in the U.S. Navy.
- Roberta L. Hazard was selected for promotion to rear admiral upper half May 18, 1988, the first woman to be board selected for that grade in the U.S. Navy.
- Petty Officer First Class Beth Lambert became the first female selected as Shore Sailor of the Year in the U.S. Navy. She was then meritoriously advanced to Chief Petty Officer.

=== 1989 ===
- May 1 - Anne N. Foreman took office as United States Under Secretary of the Air Force. She served in this capacity until January 20, 1993.
- Sandra Stosz became the first woman to serve as a military aide to the Secretary of Transportation.
- First enlisted woman in the Coast Guard assigned as officer-in-charge ashore: Krystine Carbajal.
- First woman in the Coast Guard promoted to CWO (ELC): Lauren Cantatore.
- First woman in the Coast Guard promoted to CWO (COMMS): Robin Patton.
- The Commandant of the Coast Guard initiates the Women in the Coast Guard Study.
- Gail Harris became the first female and African American to lead the Intelligence Department for Fleet Air Reconnaissance Squadron in Rota, Spain, the largest U.S. Navy aviation squadron.
- CPTs Heidi Brown (USMA '81) and Mary Finch (USMA '83) became the first female graduates of West Point to serve as tactical officers.
- Kristin Baker became the first female Brigade Commander at West Point when she is named First Captain of the U.S. Corps of Cadets (Class of 1990).
- 2LT Laura Slattery (USMA '88) is the first woman to earn the title of distinguished honor graduate of the Air Assault School at West Point.
- Carla Miller became the first female West Point cadet to be named an all-America Division II in women's soccer by the National Soccer Coaches Association of America.
- Gillian Schweitzer became the first female West Point cadet to win all-Americas for diving (with success in both the one and three-meter dives).
- West Point cadet Ann Marie Wycoff, for the second-straight year, is named "Outstanding Women's Swimmer" at the NCAA Division II Swimming and Diving Championships and became the winningest female swimmer in NCAA Division II history, defending her national title in four events en route to her career total of nine. She will ultimately win 19 all-America recognitions.
- Janice Ayers is the first woman serving as Command Master Chief at sea.
- The first woman EA was assigned to CNO in the U.S. Navy.
- Around 770 U.S. women were part of Operation Just Cause.
- During the invasion of Panama in 1989, CPT Linda L. Bray became the first woman to lead US troops in battle. CPT Bray commanded the 988th Military Police Company out of Ft. Benning, GA, and ordered her assault team to fire on soldiers of the Panamanian Defense Forces (PDF) who refused to surrender their positions at a dog kennel.

== 1990s ==
- Gail Harris was specifically chosen by the Director of Naval Intelligence and Commander of U.S. Naval Forces Central Command to fill in as Acting Naval Attache, Egypt, for a five-month period, becoming the first female Attache to a Middle Eastern country.

=== 1990 ===
- 1990-1991 Persian Gulf War: Around 40,000 military women from the U.S. were deployed during Operations Desert Shield and Desert Storm. Desert Shield began with 14 women reservists from the Coast Guard serving in the Persian Gulf. One female U.S. Army doctor and one U.S. enlisted woman were held as POWs in 1991 during Operation Desert Storm. 600 U.S. Navy women participated in Operation Desert Shield and Desert Storm. Navy women served on hospital ships, supply ships, fleet oilers, ammunition ships, repair ships, and tenders. Female Navy pilots flew helicopters and reconnaissance aircraft. Sixteen U.S. servicewomen were killed during the war.
- MAJ Margaret Bahnsen became the first female Regimental Tactical Officer at West Point (3rd Regiment), although MAJ Brenda Bradley served as an acting Regimental Tactical Officer in July 1987.
- CDR Rosemary Bryant Mariner became the first woman to assume command of an aviation squadron in the U.S. Navy.
- CAPT Marsha J. Evans became the first woman to assume command of a U.S. Naval Station.
- LCDR Darlene Iskra, SPECOPS officer, became the first woman to assume command of a ship in the U.S. Navy (USS Opportune (ARS-41)).
- CMDCM Carol Cooper became the first female Command Master Chief of a U.S. Naval Security Group.
- Amy Bratton became the first Army woman to qualify for the NCAA Championships in tennis.
- LT Sandra Stosz took command of USCGC Katmai Bay, becoming the first female commanding officer of a 140-foot icebreaking tug and also the first woman to command any Coast Guard vessel on the Great Lakes.
- First Women's Policy Advisor appointed in the Coast Guard: Lane McClelland.
- First woman in the Coast Guard promoted to CWO (BOSN): Anne Visser.
- ENS Patricia A. McFetridge became the first female Coast Guard aviator to receive the Distinguished Flying Cross.

=== 1991 ===
- 27 February: Then-Major Rhonda Cornum, United States Army, was shot down while aboard a helicopter in the Persian Gulf War. She and the others aboard the helicopter were made POWs and subjected to torture. She later co-wrote a book about her experiences, She Went to War: the Rhonda Cornum Story (ISBN 0891415076), with Peter Copeland.
- 1991: Women's Advisory Council established in the Coast Guard.
- March: Marie Rossi was the first woman in American military history to serve in combat as an aviation unit commander, during the Persian Gulf War in 1991, and the first woman pilot in United States history to fly combat missions. She was killed when the CH-47 Chinook she was piloting crashed in Saudi Arabia, on March 1, 1991.
- Marilyn Melendez Dykman became the first Hispanic-American female Coast Guard aviator.
- Colleen McCabe ends her record-breaking sports career at West Point with a 21–7 record, a 0.53 ERA (ninth in the nation) and the league's "Player of the Year" her final year. Her records for strikeouts, wins and ERA are still team records.
- The U.S. Navy assigns its first women to command a naval station and an aviation squadron.
- The first U.S. Navy woman to command a ship is Lt. Cmdr. Darlene M. Iskra, commander of the salvage vessel USS Opportune on December 27.
- The [U.S.] Presidential Commission on the Assignment of Women in the Armed Forces was created. The Department of Defense delayed implementation of a combat exclusion law change pending results of the Presidential commission.
- NCCM Ginger Simpson became the first woman director of the Senior Enlisted Academy in the U.S. Navy.
- Julianne Gallina became the first Brigade Commander at the U.S. Naval Academy.
- The U.S. Air Force Reserve selects its first woman senior enlisted advisor.
- Laws banning women from flying in combat are repealed by the U.S. Congress.

=== 1992 ===
- June: Paula Coughlin publicly acted as a whistleblower, opening investigations into what would later be known as the Tailhook scandal.
- Lane I. McClelland became the first active duty woman since SPARs promoted to the rank of captain in the U.S. Coast Guard.
- Rabbi Karen Soria became the first female rabbi to serve in the U.S. Marines, which she did from 1992 until 1996.
- Vivien Crea became the first woman to command an air station in the Coast Guard.
- First Hispanic American woman advanced to E-7 in the Coast Guard: Sonia Colon.
- Marcia Geiger became the first female West Point cadet to win a Hertz Fellowship.
- Cpl. Marlene Shillingford became the first woman selected to join the Snowbirds team. The Snowbirds are the Canadian Air Force's aerobatic demonstration flying team.
- VCNO establishes guidelines for the proper portrayal of women in training and promotional media, to limit stereotyping and show the contributions women make to the U.S. Navy.
- LCDR Barbara Schooley became the first woman to assume command of a Reserve ship in the U.S. Navy.
- CDR Judy Chesser Coffman, of the U.S. Navy, was the first female helicopter pilot to fly in Antarctica, in support of the National Science Foundation.
- BUCM Carol Keehner became the first female seabee Master Chief in the U.S. Navy.
- CDR Lin Hutton became the first female U.S. Navy commanding officer of a Fleet Support Squadron, VRC-40.
- Brigadier General Carol Mutter assumes command of the 3d Force Service Support Group, Okinawa, the first woman to command a Fleet Marine Force unit at the flag level.
- First mixed gender recruit companies graduate from the U.S. Naval Training Command Orlando.
- Gunnery Sergeant Melody Naatz became the first female Drill Instructor in the U.S. Marines.
- 1992-1993: CPT Margaret Belknap (USMA '81), in the Systems Engineering department, is the first woman to serve as a White House Fellow.

=== 1993 ===
- 4 February: The U.S. Navy notified Congress that all aviation squadrons, the Naval Construction Force "Seabees", and all classes of ships with the exception of Submarines, Mine Counter Measure (MCM), Mine Coastal Hunters (MHC), and Coastal Patrol Boats (PC) were open to women.
- July: Sheila Widnall became the first woman to be chosen as Secretary of the Air Force.
- The women's soccer team at West Point wins the Patriot League championship for the first time.
- Col. Jeannie Leavitt (maiden name Flynn) became the first American female F-15E pilot, and went on to become the first female pilot to graduate from the U.S. Air Force Weapons School.
- Chana Timoner became the first female rabbi to hold an active duty assignment as a chaplain in the U.S. Army.
- Laws banning women from serving on combat ships is repealed by the U.S. Congress.
- The Combat Exclusion Law is modified by the FY-94 Defense Authorization Bill.
- U.S. women deploy with the USS Fox.
- The U.S. Navy conducted its first Feasibility Study on women entering 1120 community and submarine ratings.
- The U.S. Secretary of Defense opens combat aviation and 17 women are approved to train on combat aircraft in the Navy.
- The U.S. Navy opens enlisted aircrew positions. Opening ratings and unit redesignation increased female sea duty opportunities by 25%.
- CAPT Patricia Ann Tracey and CAPT Katharine Laughton were selected by the same selection board for Admiral in the U.S. Navy.
- CDR Jane Skiles O'Dea, CDR Lin Hutton, CDR Rosemary Mariner, and Naval Reserve CDR Joellen Oslund were the first women aviators selected for promotion to captain in the U.S. Navy.
- LT Shannon Workman became the first woman pilot to qualify for night landing on a carrier in the U.S. Navy.
- LCDR Janet Marnane was the first woman to report to a Carrier Air Group (CAG) staff in the U.S. Navy.
- RADM Marsha J. Evans became the first woman to be Commander, U.S. Navy Recruiting Command.
- Two women, LTJG Russell and LTJG Schweinfirth, completed a deployment aboard a combatant when they performed 179 days TAD aboard USS Fox (CG-33).
- Kathryn P. Hire is the first U.S. female Naval aviator.
- The first woman assumes command of a U.S. Naval base (RADM Louise Wilmot, at Philadelphia.)
- The U.S. Marine Corps opens pilot positions to women.
- 2nd Lieutenant Sarah Deal became the first woman Marine selected for Naval aviation training.

=== 1994 ===
- July: While with Pacific Fleet F-14 Fleet Replacement Squadron, Fighter Squadron 124 (VF-124), Kara Hultgreen failed her first attempt at carrier qualification, but she successfully carrier-qualified at the end of July 1994 during a second period aboard USS Constellation, becoming the first "combat qualified" female naval aviator.
- November 15: Navy Lt. Kimberly “Face” Dyson became the first female pilot to fly an official combat mission for the American military.
- Rear Admiral Louise Currie Wilmot retired. At the time of her retirement, she was the highest ranking and most highly decorated woman in the Navy.
- Although women had held command cadre positions aboard the U.S. Coast Guard's WPB fleet beginning in 1979 it was not until 1994 that the service began integrating their crews. During that year CGC Monomoy and Pea Island became the first fully integrated patrol boats in the Coast Guard.
- Lt. Laura A. Piper became the first female graduate of any US Service Academy to die in a combat zone and the first female graduate of the US Air Force Academy to receive the purple heart.
- Vivien Crea became the first woman in the Coast Guard to serve as Executive Assistant to the Commandant.
- Nadine H. Lewis was the first female YN in the Coast Guard to be awarded a cutterman's pin.
- The first woman assumes command of a U.S. Naval Air Station.
- The U S Naval Academy revised the service selection policy and for the first time women midshipmen were required to select warfare specialties under the same guidance as men. On service selection day, 63 women midshipmen chose Surface Warfare for their future career.
- Mary R. Henson became the first woman nuclear power candidate in the U.S. Navy.
- LT Shannon Workman, EA-6B Prowler, became the first woman combat pilot to successfully pass fleet carrier qualifications in the U.S. Navy.
- Maria A. Chavez, on board USS Mount Whitney (AE 34), became the first woman frocked to gunner's mate (guns), third class, in the U.S. Navy.
- USS Vella Gulf (CG-72) became the first U.S. Navy combatant to embark a mixed-gender Light Multi-Purpose System (LAMPS) helo detachment.
- Kara Hultgreen became the first female fighter pilot in the U.S. military to die in a crash.
- CAPT Susan Brooker, USNR, became the first woman to assume command of a U.S. Naval Reserve Readiness Command.
- AZCS Hedy Rogers-Jones became the first senior enlisted female assigned to VFA-22 in the U.S. Navy.
- Petty Officer Margaret Cooper, the first woman underwater "Seabee," graduated with honors from Underwater Seabee Navy Dive School in the U.S. Navy.
- The United States Department of Defense institutes a policy prohibiting the assigning of women to any unit below brigade level when the unit's primary mission is direct combat on the ground.
- The first women are assigned to a combatant ship with permanent orders. Terry Pelletier is the first to receive her orders for the USS Dwight D. Eisenhower and 63 women were also permanently assigned.
- Sheri Schweiker, a female West Point cadet, was named the Patriot League's women's softball "Player of the Year" and was the first player in league history to be selected for the first team in all four years.
- The women's judo team at West Point, sparked by national champions Becky Trojecki at 106 lbs. and Meghan Clark at 145 lbs., win the national championship for the first time.
- Catherine Gaffigan, a West Point cadet, wins the Patriot League cross country championship for the second-consecutive year and leads the team to its first league title this year as she qualifies for the Division I championship.
- Holly Pedley became the first female West Point cadet soccer player to be named a second team Division I all-America.
- Brigadier General Carol Mutter became the first woman major general in the Marine Corps, and the senior woman on active duty in the armed services.

=== 1995 ===
- January: Martha McSally became the first woman in U.S. history to fly a combat aircraft into enemy territory when she flew her initial mission into Iraq to help enforce the United Nations' "no-fly zone."
- March: Sheila C. Cheston served as General Counsel of the Air Force from March 1995 to October 1998.
- 25 May - Marcelite J. Harris is promoted to the rank of major general and became the first African-American woman to reach that rank.
- Kelly Flinn became the first female B-52 pilot in the United States Air Force (USAF).
- A U.S. Air Force lieutenant colonel became the first female space shuttle pilot.
- Rebecca Marier, a Corps Regimental Commander, became the first female valedictorian at West Point.
- Major Sarah Deal became the first United States Marine Corps female aviator.
- Doris Hull became the first active duty African-American woman in the Coast Guard to be advanced as a warrant officer.
- BM2 Kathy Niles became the first woman in the Coast Guard to win the Munro Award.
- ENS Lucinda Cunnigham became the first female officer in charge of any of the armed forces' honor guards.
- Gilda Jackson became the first African American female U.S. Marine Colonel and the first woman to command the Naval Aviation Depot, Cherry Point, NC.
- U.S. Lieutenant Commander Mary Townsend-Manning became the first woman to become eligible to wear the submarine "Dolphins" pin after completing submarine engineering duty officer qualifications.
- IS1 Robin Sou became the first female intelligence specialist placed for independent duty on board a surface combatant, USS Briscoe.
- First women graduate the U.S. Navy "Seaman to Admiral" program (ENS Elisabeth M. Brown, ENS Donna I. Coccodrilli, ENS Nancy E. Schmidt) and are assigned to Surface Warfare Officer School, Newport, RI.
- LTJG Kirsten Culler became the first woman to complete training on the newest Navy training jet, the T-45 Goshawk.
- CAPT Lin V. Hutton became the first woman to assume command of a U.S. Naval Air Station, NAS Key West.
- USS Benfold (DDG-65) was delivered as the first US Navy ship to be built, keel up, with the modifications necessary for full gender integration.
- CDR Judy Chesser Coffman was the first female U.S. Navy flight deck officer (on board the USS Essex), as well as the first to qualify as AV-8B LSO (in Yuma, AZ).
- Shannon Faulkner became the first female cadet to enter The Citadel. Faulkner enrolled after a successful lawsuit against the military academy. She joined an otherwise all-male class on August 15, 1995 under the escort of United States Marshals. After four hours of the military indoctrination training, she spent the remainder of the first week in the infirmary before voluntarily resigning, citing emotional and psychological abuse and physical exhaustion. After her departure, the male cadets openly celebrated on the campus.

=== 1996 ===
- Rosetta Burke became the first female general of the Army National Guard.
- Jennifer Oliva and Victoria Huse became the first female West Point cadets to win Truman Scholarships.
- Carol Mutter became the first female three star officer in the U.S. Marines. The U.S. Navy's first woman promoted to three-star rank (vice admiral) is Patricia Tracey.
- The USS Laboon, the Aegis-class destroyer, fired eight Tomahawk cruise missiles at Iraq, as part of the joint service strike against Saddam Hussein. LT (JG) Erica Niedermeier, Ordnance Officer, was one of two officers who supervised the strike team, and was one of 22 women assigned to the ship's crew of 340. The missile strikes were the first time female sailors had taken part in combat operations since the Navy opened warship assignments to women in 1994.
- CAPT Roseanne Milroy, NC, USNR, became the first Nurse Corps officer to command a fleet hospital in the U.S. Navy.
- CAPT Bonnie Burnham Potter, MC, USN became the first female physician in the Navy, Army, or Air Force to be selected for flag rank.
- LCDR Anne M. Krekelberg, CHC, became the first female U.S. Navy chaplain to join a warship, USS Bataan.

=== 1997 ===
- Colonel Ann Wright received the State Department Award for Heroism, after helping to evacuate several thousand people during the civil war in Sierra Leone.
- Kelly Flinn was discharged from the U.S. Air Force in 1997 after an adulterous affair with the husband of an enlisted subordinate, for military offenses including disobeying a direct order from her commanding officer to break off the affair, and for lying to him about having done so. Flinn's trouble with the Air Force received widespread media attention at the time and was discussed in a U.S. Senate hearing on May 22, 1997.
- The U.S. Military Academy conducts a 20th anniversary West Point Conference on Women Cadets recommended by the DA Committee on Women in the Services (DACOWITS) to discuss gender issues with cadets and make recommendations on ways to improve the West Point climate for women.
- COL Maureen LeBoeuf is appointed Professor and Head of the Department of Physical Education becoming the first woman named head of an academic department and "Master of the Sword" at West Point.
- Martha Rainville became the first woman to be named a state adjutant general when she wins the legislative election for appointment as head of the Vermont National Guard, defeating 16-year incumbent Donald E. Edwards.
- Pamela Autry became the first female Chief of the Boat in the Coast Guard.
- Claudia J. Kennedy became the first woman in the United States Army to hold a three-star rank.
- The 1st group of female Marines complete the male/female integrated U.S. Marine Combat Training Course at Camp Geiger, NC, with LCpl Melissa Ohm as honor graduate.
- Gunnery Sgt. Patricia Crimmins became the first female U.S. Marine to earn the drum major military occupational specialty (MOS 5521).
- October 18, 1997: The Women in Military Service for America Memorial officially opens to the public.
- RADM Bonnie Burnham Potter became the first woman to assume command of National Naval Medical Command Bethesda (NNMC) in the U.S. Navy.

=== 1998 ===
- 10 June: CDR Maureen Farren became the first woman in the U.S. Navy to command a surface combatant, USS Mount Vernon (LSD-39).
- 17 December: LT Kendra Williams, F/A-18 pilot, credited as first female pilot to launch missiles in combat. She was flying with the U.S. Navy in support of Operation Desert Fox.
- Heather Wilson became the first female combat veteran to be elected to a full term in the United States Congress.
- RDML Lillian E. Fishburne became the first African-American female to hold the rank of rear admiral in the US Navy.
- CAPT Deborah Loewer was the first woman in the U.S. Navy selected for a major afloat command. Assumed command of USS Camden (AOE-2) in December.
- Sally Brice-O'Hara became the first female commanding officer of a Coast Guard training center.
- Patricia Stolle, Diane Bucci became the first two women "Gold Badge" Command Master Chief Petty Officers in the Coast Guard:.
- Sandra O'Toole became the first woman Chief Petty Officer Academy School Chief in the Coast Guard.
- Col. Susan J. Smythe became the first woman appointed to a command dental surgeon position in the Air Force; she served as such at Space Command, Peterson Air Force Base.

=== 1999 ===
- 12 March: CDR Michelle Howard assumed command of USS Rushmore (LSD 47). She was the first African American woman to assume command of a surface combatant in the U.S. Navy.
- August: Carol A. DiBattiste became United States Under Secretary of the Air Force. She served in this position until 2001.
- First woman in the Coast Guard promoted to CWO (WEPs): Jo Wildman.
- First women in the Coast Guard promoted to CWO (ENG): Gayla Thompson, Karyn Terry.
- LTJG Kathy Niles became the first woman in the Coast Guard to command an 87-foot WPB.
- Nicki Robbins became the first Army player selected to the Northeast Regional first team in women's softball.
- Sgt. Kelly L. Anderson is the first woman to successfully complete Designated Marksman School at Fleet Combat Training Center Dam Neck, Virginia.
- MHC and MCM-class ships in the U.S. Navy were opened to female officers and enlisted. Coromorant and Kingfisher were the first to receive enlisted women.
- CMDCM Hedy Roger-Jones became the first female CMC assigned to a Strike Fighter Squadron, NAS Lemoore.
- The 28-day Sapper Leader Course at Fort Leonard Wood, Mo., where combat engineers and engineer officers earn the Sapper tab, has been open to women since 1999.
- Linda J. Bird, USN was promoted to Rear Admiral (Lower Half) as the first female flag officer in the Supply Corps.

== See also ==
- Timeline of women in war in the United States, Pre-1945
- American women in World War I
- American women in World War II
- Timeline of women in warfare in the United States since 2000
- Timeline of women in warfare and the military in the United States, 2000–2010
- Timeline of women in warfare and the military in the United States, 2011–present
