= Frank Livingston Ball =

American politician

Member of the Virginia Senate from the 13th district
- In office 1924–1932

Personal details
- Born: October 4, 1885 Ashton Heights Historic District, [Virginia, U.S.
- Died: April 28, 1966 (aged 80)
- Resting place: Columbia Gardens Cemetery, Virginia, U.S.
- Spouse: Anna M. Shreve (m. 1913)
- Children: 4
- Education: National University School of Law
- Occupation: politician; lawyer

Frank Livingston Ball (October 4, 1885 – April 28, 1966) was a member of the Virginia Senate from 1924 to 1932.

== Early life and education ==
Frank Livingston Ball was born in Clarendon, Arlington, Virginia on October 4, 1885 to America A. (née Deeble) and William Ball, a member of the Ball family that Ballston, Virginia is named for. He was educated in public schools and graduated from Western High School in Washington, D.C. He graduated from the National University School of Law with a law degree in 1908.

== Career ==
Ball started practicing law at Fort Myer Heights in Rosslyn, Virginia. In 1915, Ball was elected Commonwealth's Attorney of Arlington County. He served as the Commonwealth's Attorney from 1916 to 1924. During World War I, Ball served as fuel administrator of Arlington County and chairman of the United War Work Campaign. After the war, he was chairman of the first campaign for Near East Relief.

Ball practiced law with Ball & Douglas. He was elected as a member of the Virginia Senate of the 13th Senatorial District, and served from 1924 to 1932. He attended the Constitutional Convention of 1945 and the Constitutional Convention of 1956.

Ball was the author of the County Manager Form of Government. Arlington County adopted the county manager form of government in 1930.

== Personal life ==
Ball married Anna M. Shreve on September 10, 1913. Together, they had four children: Frank Livingston Ball Jr., Elizabeth, Virginia and Barbara.

In 1926, Ball bought and moved into the historic Glebe House in Arlington.

== Death ==
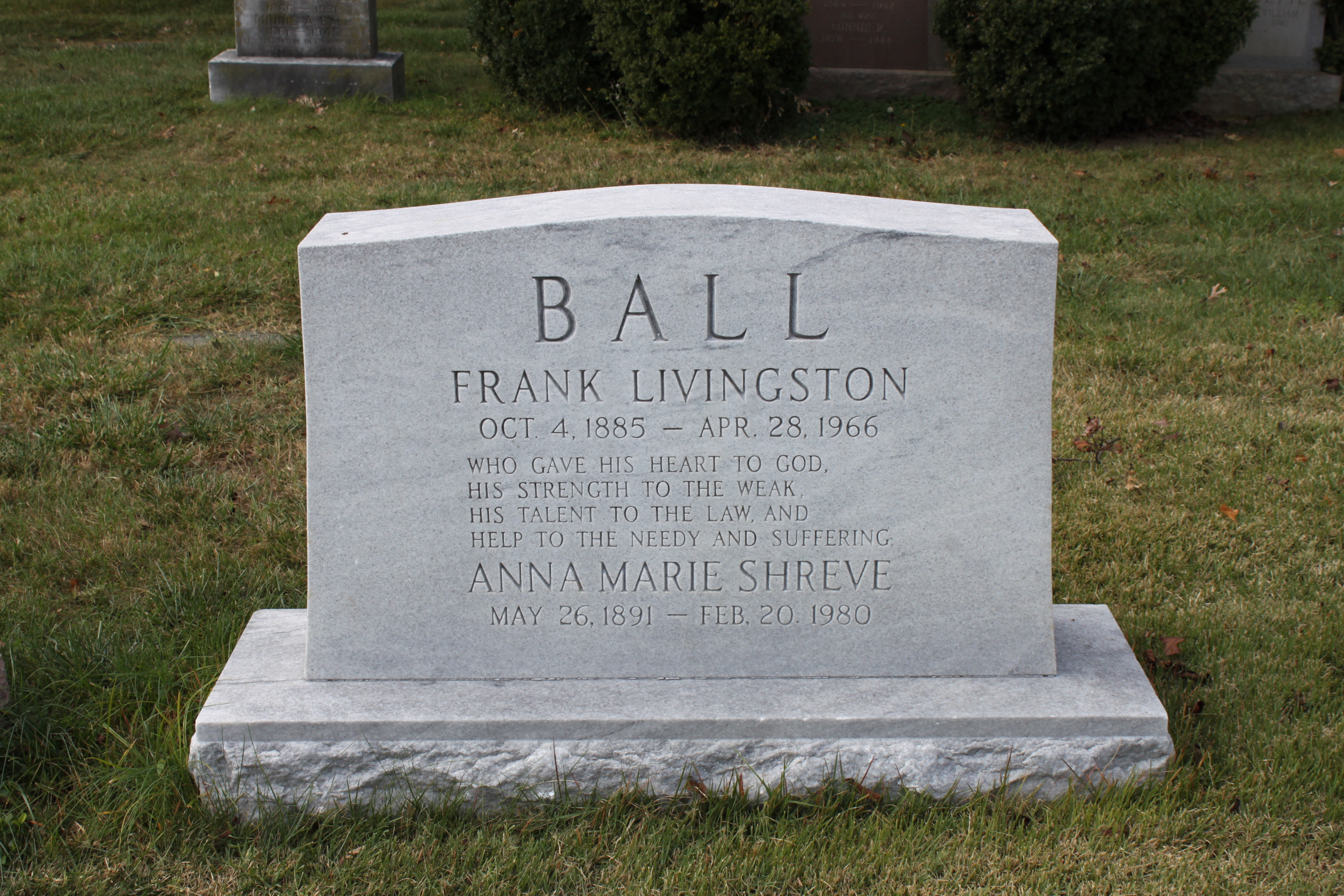
The gravesite of Ball and his wife at Columbia Gardens Cemetery in Arlington County, Virginia

Ball died on April 28, 1966, at age 80.
