= Dillaway =

Dillaway is a surname. Notable people with the surname include:

- Aaron Dillaway (born 1971), Australian politician
- Don Dillaway (1903–1982), American actor
- Robert Beacham Dillaway (1924–2015), American aeronautical engineer

== See also ==
- Dallaway, surname
- Dillaway School
- Dilloway, surname
