= Barbara J. Bishop =

Barbara Janet Bishop
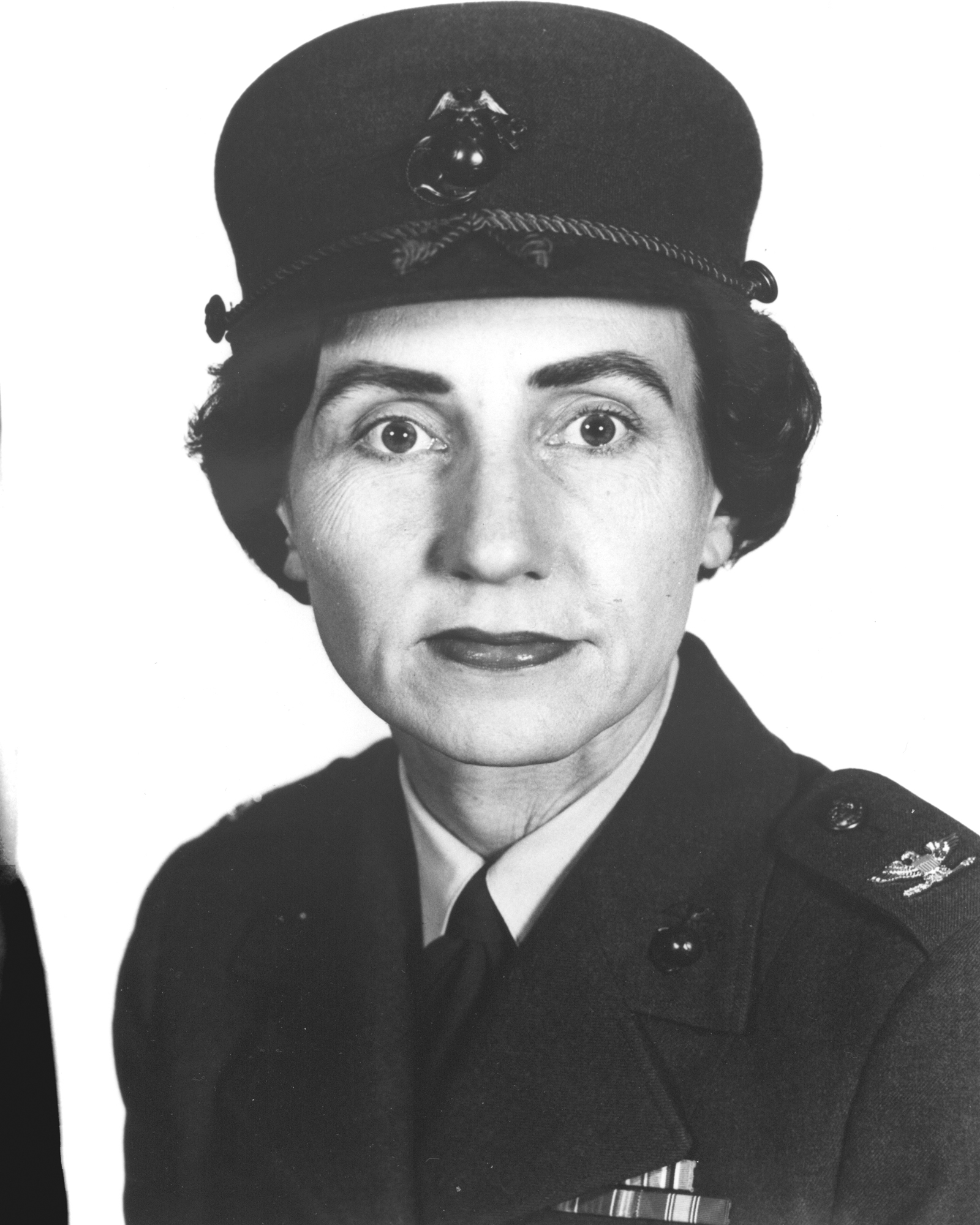
- Director of Women Marines (1964–1969)
- Born: October 2, 1920; Boston, Massachusetts, U.S.
- Died: January 28, 2005 (aged 84)
- Allegiance: United States of America
- Branch: United States Marine Corps
- Service years: 1943 - 1946, 1948 - 1969
- Rank: Colonel
- Commands: Women’s Recruit Training Battalion; Director of Women Marines

Colonel Barbara Janet Bishop, USMC (October 2, 1920 – January 28, 2005), was Director of Women Marines from January 1964 until her retirement in August 1969. Prior to this assignment, she completed a tour of duty in Naples, Italy as Military Secretary to the Commander in Chief, Allied Forces, Southern Europe.

== Early years ==
Bishop was born in Boston, Massachusetts, on October 2, 1920. She received her early schooling in Everett, Massachusetts, graduating with honors from Everett High School in 1938. In September 1938, she entered Yale University where she completed a six-year course in five years, and was awarded a Bachelor of Fine Arts Degree in Art, January 30, 1943. Five days later, she received her Marine officer training. Later, after serving on active duty with the Marine Corps from 1943 to 1946, Bishop earned her Master of Arts Degree at the University of Chicago from September 1946 to June 1948. She accomplished her thesis on five Florentine Cassone panels exhibited in the Boston Museum of Fine Arts, and was working on her doctorate when she was recalled to active duty by the Marine Corps in 1948.

== Marine Corps career ==
Bishop enlisted in the U.S. Marine Corps Women's Reserve on February 18, 1943, and was assigned to active duty on April 10, 1943, reporting as a private to the Marine Corps Women's Reserve Officer Candidates’ Class at the U.S. Naval Reserve Midshipmen's School (WR), at Northampton, Massachusetts. She was appointed a Cadet in the Women's Reserve on May 4, 1943, and June 1, of that year, was commissioned a Marine Reserve second lieutenant.

She was assigned as a detachment officer with the Marine Training Detachment at the U.S. Naval Training School, Indiana University Bloomington. From October 1943 through March 1945, she was attached to the Marine Aviation Detachment at the Naval Air Station, Atlanta, Georgia, as an administrative officer. In April 1945, she joined Aviation Women's Reserve Squadron 21 at the Marine Corps Air Station, Quantico, Virginia, serving as Squadron Executive Officer and Commanding Officer, respectively, until February 1946. She served with the Division of Aviation at Headquarters Marine Corps as Officer in Charge of Secret and Confidential Files until she was assigned to an inactive duty status, September 10, 1946, with the rank of captain in the Women's Reserve.

With the passage of the Women's Armed Forces Integration Act in 1948, a transfer of personnel to a “regular” status was effected and, at the same time, the Women's Reserve received the title of Women Marines. Bishop was recalled to active duty while a graduate student at the University of Chicago in November 1948, and reported for active duty and was commissioned a captain in the Women Marines, December 7, 1948. Assigned to Headquarters Marine Corps, she assumed duty as Officer in Charge, Secret and Confidential Files, Division of Plans and Policies. While there, she was promoted to major in February 1951.

In February 1952, she was transferred to Hawaii where she served in the same capacity at Headquarters, Fleet Marine Force, Pacific, until September 1953. On her return to the continental United States, she served as Commanding Officer, Women Marine Company, Marine Corps Base, Camp Lejeune, North Carolina. She was promoted to lieutenant colonel in February 1955 with rank from January 1954. She returned to Headquarters Marine Corps in May 1955 to serve as Head, Women's Branch, Division of Reserve, with additional duty as deputy director of Women Marines. From October 1956 through July 1959, she was assigned as Commanding Officer, Women's Recruit Training Battalion, Marine Corps Recruit Depot Parris Island.

In August 1959, she was named Assistant G-1, Marine Corps Schools, Quantico, serving until February 1962. In March 1962 she reported to Naples, Italy for duty as Military Secretary to the Commander in Chief, Allied Forces, Southern Europe. On January 3, 1964, she was promoted to the temporary rank of colonel. Upon assuming her new post, Bishop became the fourth Director of Women Marines, succeeding Colonels Katherine A. Towle (1948–53), Julia E. Hamblet (1953–59), and Margaret M. Henderson (1959–64). Prior to this, there were three directors of the Women's Reserve, Colonels Ruth Cheney Streeter (1943–45), Katherine A. Towle (1945–46), and Julia E. Hamblet (1946–48). Colonel Bishop retired in November 1969.

== Death and legacy ==
Colonel Barbara Bishop died on January 28, 2005, aged 84.

== Awards & honors ==

American Campaign Medal	World War II Victory Medal	National Defense Service Medal

Preceded by Margaret M. Henderson	Director of Women Marines; 1964—1969	Succeeded by Jeanette I. Sustad
