= Jeanette I. Sustad =

United States Marine Corps officer

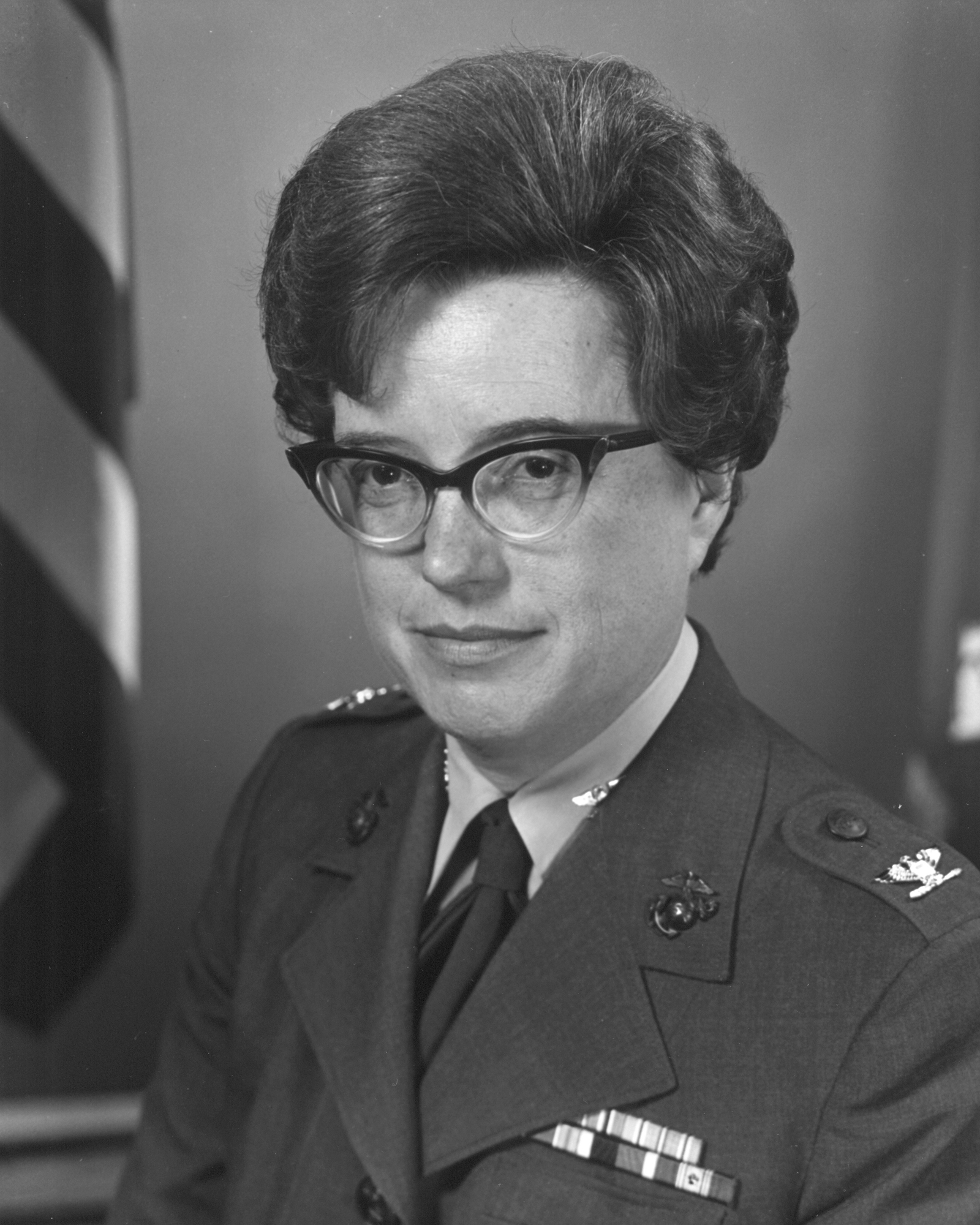
- 6th Director of Women Marines (1969–1973)
- Born: September 9, 1922; Minneapolis, Minnesota, US
- Died: February 5, 1978 (aged 55) Bremerton, Washington, US
- Allegiance: United States
- Branch: United States Marine Corps
- Service years: 1943–1945, 1948–1973
- Rank: Colonel
- Commands: Director of Women Marines
- Awards: Legion of Merit

Colonel Jeanette I. Sustad, USMC (September 9, 1922 – February 5, 1978) was the sixth director of Women Marines from 1969 until her retirement in 1973, for which she was awarded the Legion of Merit for exceptionally meritorious performance of outstanding service.

== Education ==
Born in Minneapolis, Minnesota, she moved with her parents at an early age to Tacoma, Washington, where she graduated from Stadium High School. She later earned a B.A. degree in sociology at the University of Washington in Seattle in 1943.

== Marine Corps career ==
Sustad joined the United States Marine Corps Women's Reserve on May 8, 1943, just three months after the Marine Corps opened for women to join. She received officer training at Marine Corps Base Camp Lejeune, North Carolina, and was commissioned a reserve second lieutenant on December 27, 1943. Her first assignment was as field operations officer at the Marine Corps Auxiliary Air Facility in Oak Grove, North Carolina. In May 1945, she was assigned as communications watch officer at the Marine Corps Air Station, Oahu, Hawaii, and served in that capacity until she was assigned to inactive duty status in December 1945.

Following demobilization, she spent a year in graduate study at the University of Minnesota and was employed as a Veterans Counselor by the U.S. Employment Services in Tacoma, Washington. Upon passage of the Women's Armed Services Integration Act in 1948, she accepted a regular commission as a first lieutenant in the Marine Corps and reported to Headquarters Marine Corps in December 1948.

Transferred to Marine Corps Recruit Depot Parris Island, South Carolina, in January 1949, she served as executive officer of the newly formed Women's Recruit Training Battalion. She was promoted to captain in August 1949. From May 1950 until July 1950, she served as executive officer, Women Officers Training Detachment, Marine Corps Base Quantico, Virginia. From that assignment, Captain Sustad became Adjutant of Marine Corps Base Camp Pendleton, California. Upon activation of the first post-World War II Women Marine Company at Camp Pendleton, she became its commanding officer, serving in this capacity until August 1952.

Captain Sustad was then named monitor in the Staff Message Control Branch, Headquarters, United States European Command, Frankfurt, Germany. After her promotion to major in July 1953, she became assistant head of the branch. In the spring of 1954, the headquarters was moved to Paris, France, and Major Sustad continued her assignment there.

Upon her return to the United States in September 1954, she subsequently served as executive officer of the Women's Recruit Training Battalion, Parris Island, followed by tours as Officer in Charge of Procurement Aids Branch, Headquarters, 9th Marine Corps District, Chicago, Illinois; assistant to the executive officer and plans officer, G-1 Division, Headquarters Marine Corps; and as operations officer of the Marine Corps Educational Center, Quantico. She was promoted to lieutenant colonel in September 1962 while stationed at Headquarters Marine Corps.

Lieutenant Colonel Sustad became the first full-time deputy director of Women Marines in July 1965, and served in this capacity until November 1967. From December 1967 to January 1969, she served as Assistant G-1, Camp Pendleton. She was promoted to her final rank on 11 April 1968.

She served as director of Women Marines from 1969 until retiring from active duty on January 31, 1973. She had received the Legion of Merit from the Commandant of the Marine Corps, in retirement ceremonies held at the Marine Barracks, Washington, D.C. for exceptionally meritorious performance of outstanding service as Director of Women Marines from February 1969 through January 1973.

Colonel Jeanette Sustad died on February 5, 1978.

Preceded by Barbara J. Bishop	Director of Women Marines; 1969–1973	Succeeded by Margaret A. Brewer
