= Columbia Gardens Cemetery =

Cemetery in Arlington, Virginia

- U.S. Historic district – Contributing property
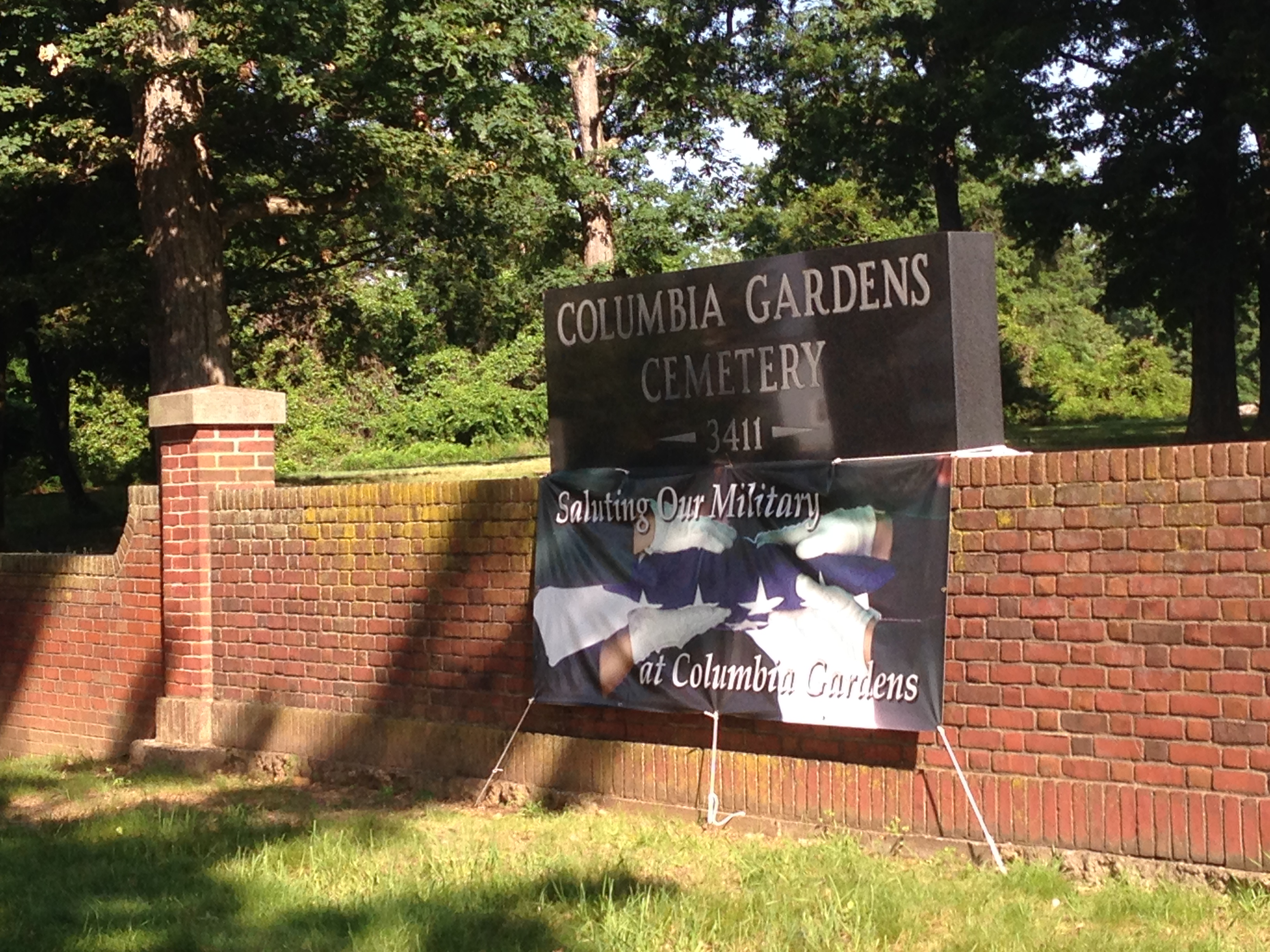
- Sign at the southern border of the cemetery, Arlington Blvd

- Location within District of Columbia
- Location: 3411 Arlington Boulevard; Arlington, Virginia
- Coordinates: 38°52′26″N 77°05′25″W
- Built: 1917
- Part of: Ashton Heights Historic District (ID03000561)
- NRHP reference No.

The Columbia Gardens Cemetery is a cemetery located in the Ashton Heights Historic District of Arlington, Virginia, United States.

== Cemetery ==
The Columbia Gardens Cemetery is located at the southern boundary of the Ashton Heights Historic District and is one of its most prominent features.

The cemetery was created by the Alexandria Park Association, incorporated in 1914 in Huntington, West Virginia. The president of the association was Colonel Robert Dye, former superintendent of the Arlington National Cemetery, and its principal founder was Julius Broh. Another founder was Harry Randolph Thomas, great-grandfather of the current president, Daun Thomas Frankland. The Thomas family has been responsible for the cemetery since it opened in 1917.

In the proposal to the Arlington County Board, the Association indicated the intent to "make a place that will be attractive as a park and a credit to the county."

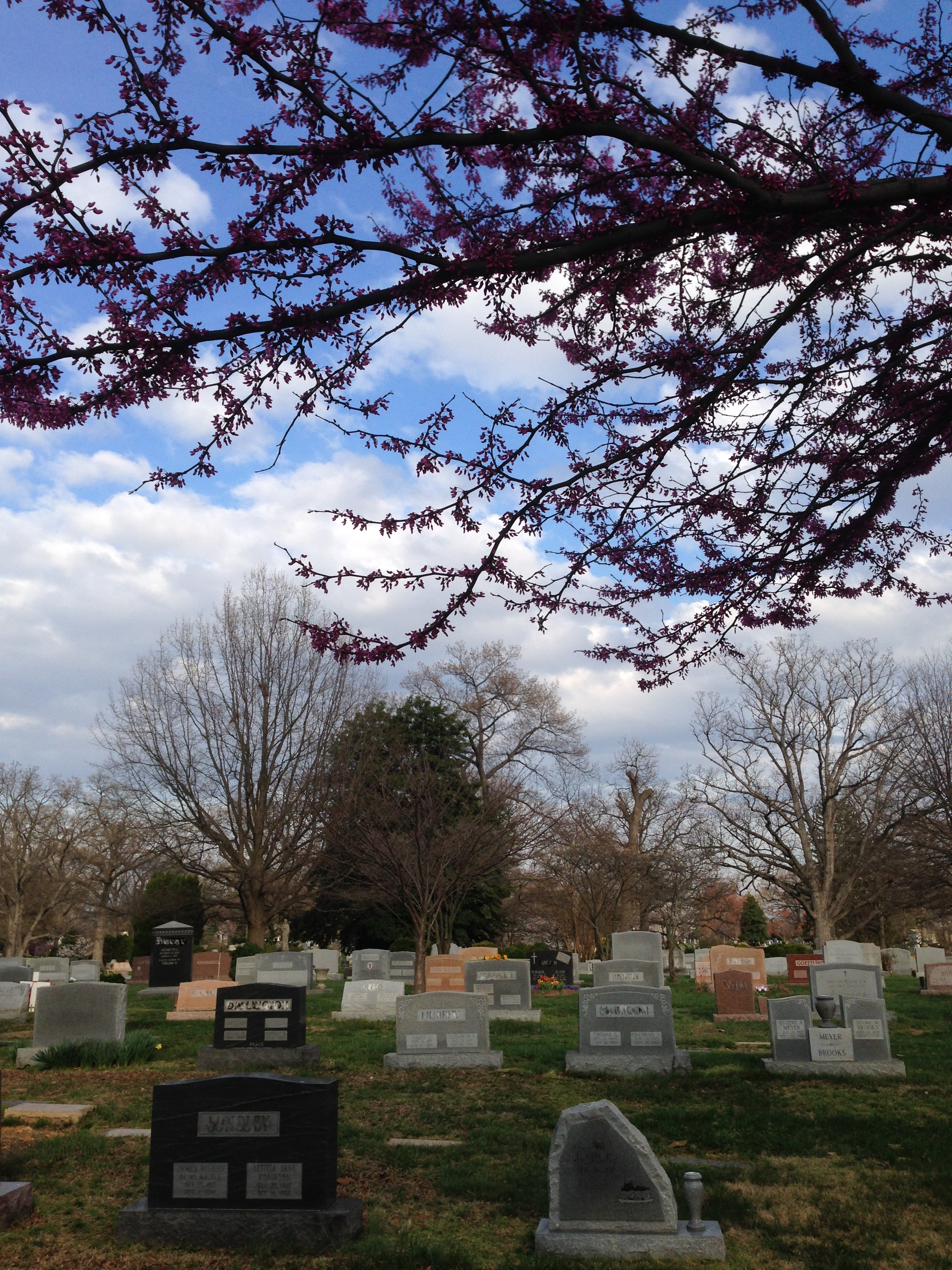
Grave sites at Columbia Gardens

Having won approval from the county, in November 1917, the Association's board of directors employed a landscape architect from Cleveland, Ohio, a Mr. Jenney, to prepare the design, specifications, and methods of procedure for operating a cemetery.

The Columbia Gardens Cemetery is an example of merging landscape design and city planning based on the principles set down in the late 19th century by designers such as Frederick Law Olmsted and subsequently developed by the City Beautiful movement. However, as opposed to the linear plans advocated by City Beautiful for urban design, Jenney preferred a more rural cemetery design, with winding roads and natural landscape features.

The "park" initially encompassed nearly thirty-eight adjoining acres, with an option to purchase an additional thirty acres. The Columbia Gardens Cemetery has been family operated for four generations. At present it is one of the few cemeteries in the Northern Virginia area offering available burial sites with the option of an upright monument. Other options range from columbarium niches to family mausoleums.

Upon entering the main gates on Arlington Boulevard, a main driveway passes a rose garden beyond which lie the winding alleys of the cemetery.

Originally at Arlington National Cemetery and now at the top of the main driveway of the cemetery is the mausoleum where Admiral of the Navy George Dewey was placed upon his death until he was moved by request of his wife to a crypt at Bethlehem Chapel of the Washington National Cathedral. The mausoleum was purchased from Arlington National in 1933 and has been used as a receiving vault.

In the 1950s, the cemetery was blessed by the bishop of the Roman Catholic Diocese of Richmond. On June 12, 2020, the bishop Michael Francis Burbidge blessed the cremation garden at Columbia Gardens.

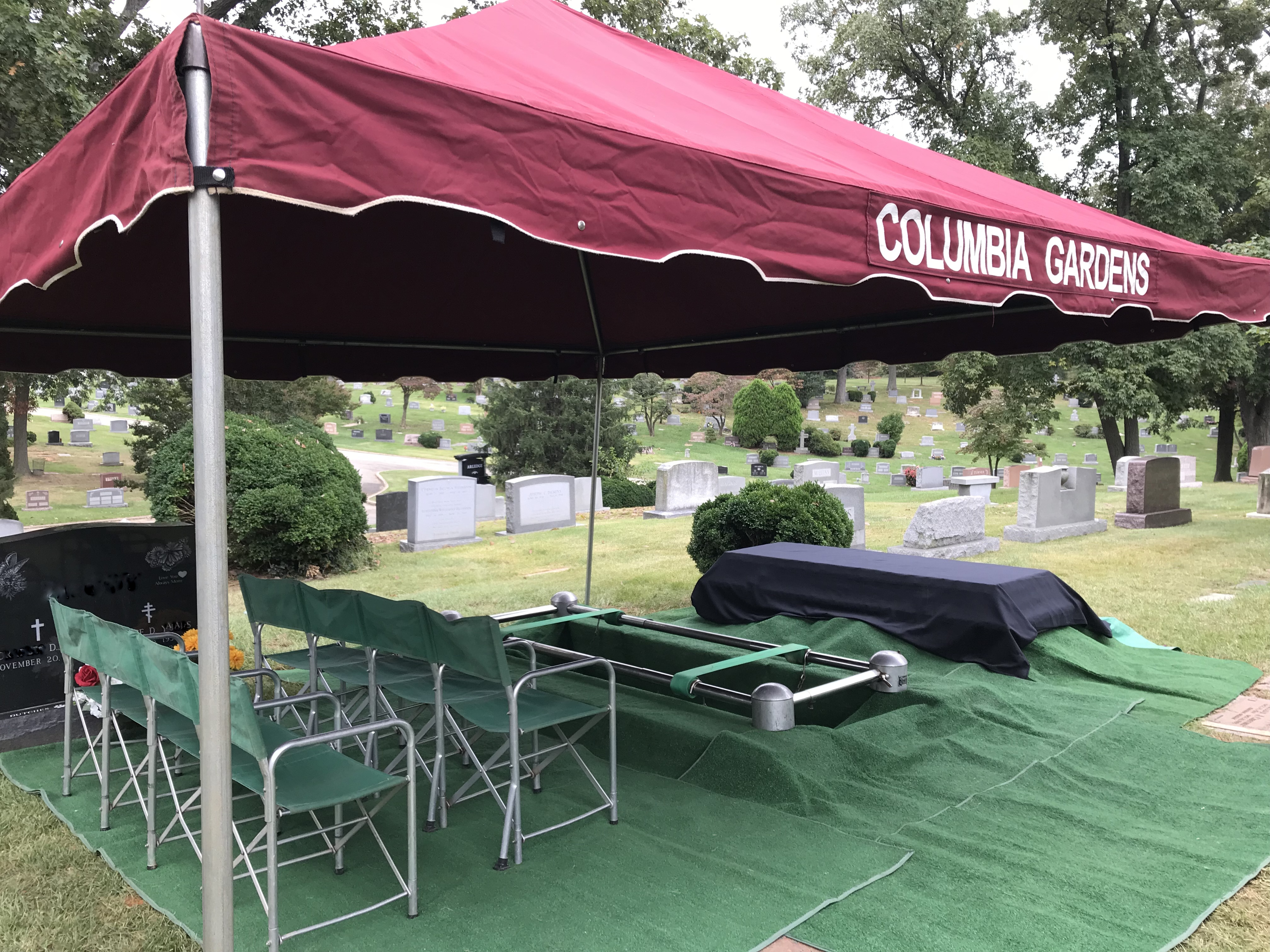
Example of a graveside service set-up

Columbia Gardens Cemetery differs from some other privately owned, state-regulated cemeteries in Northern Virginia in several respects. It permits headstones and has retained many of its existing trees rather than clearing the grounds extensively for burial space. The cemetery has also pursued recognition as an arboretum and serves families from a range of cultural backgrounds.

=== Notable burials ===
- Frank Livingston Ball (1885–1966), member of the Senate of Virginia.
- Margaret A. Brewer (1930–2013) Brigadier General, USMC. First woman to attain the rank of general officer.
- Roy Buchanan (1939–1988) guitarist and blues musician
- Robert Carlyle Byrd (1917–2010) U.S. Senator from West Virginia
- D. Jamison Cain (1926–2010), United States Postal Service employee known for coining the phrase ZIP code
- Douglas Evans Coe (1928–2017) was associate director of the Christian organization, The Fellowship, (also known as a family of friends in Christ, the prayer breakfast groups).
- Jo-Anne L. Coe (1933–2002) was the first woman to serve as Secretary of the United States Senate (1985–87), appointed by Bob Dole during his term as Senate Majority Leader in 1985.
- Charles Noel Crosby (1876–1951) US Congressman from Pennsylvania
- Robert Beacham Dillaway (1924–2015) His work on the Atlas program and applied advanced aerospace technology led to the Apollo space missions.
- Warren Fales Draper (1883–1970) was Assistant Surgeon General and later Deputy Surgeon General of the United States Public Health Service.
- Tyler Drumheller (1952–2015) CIA officer
- Edward Cunningham 'Eddie' Foster (1887–1937) Major League Baseball player, third baseman
- William C. Gloth (1886–1944), American football player and coach
- Margaret Mary Heckler (née O'Shaughnessy; 1931–2018) was an American politician, member of the Republican Party for Massachusetts who served in the United States House of Representatives for eight terms, from 1967 to 1983 and was later the Secretary of Health and Human Services and Ambassador to Ireland under President Ronald Reagan. After her defeat in 1982, no woman would be elected to Congress from Massachusetts until Niki Tsongas in a special election in 2007.
- Jerome Karle (1918–2013) Shared the 1985 Nobel Prize in chemistry for discovering a way to determine the structure of molecules.
- Isabella Karle (1921–2017) an American scientist, who was instrumental in developing techniques to extract plutonium chloride from a mixture containing plutonium oxide. She received the Garvan–Olin Medal, Gregori Aminoff Prize, Bower Award, National Medal of Science, and the Navy Distinguished Civilian Service Award.
- Oren Ritter Lewis (1902–1983) was a United States federal judge who authored the opinion on school desegregation in Virginia which was a basis for the 1954 landmark decision by the Supreme Court of the United States in Brown v. Board of Education.
- Hung-Chang Lin (Jimmy Lin) (Chinese: 凌宏璋； pinyin: Líng Hóngzhāng) (1919–2009) was a Chinese-American inventor and a professor of Electrical Engineering at the University of Maryland and inventor of the lateral transistor, wireless microphone and holder of over 60 patents.
- J. Sterling Livingston (1916–2010), management consultant, professor and entrepreneur
- J. Maynard Magruder (1900–1969), Virginia state delegate
- Porter J. McCumber (1858–1933) U.S. Senator from North Dakota
- Elizabeth "Lizzie" J. Phillips (née Magie; 1866–1948) was an American game designer and Georgist. She invented The Landlord's Game, the precursor to Monopoly, to illustrate teachings of the progressive era economist Henry George.
- Brian Pohanka (1955–2005) American Civil War author, historian and preservationist
- Jan Henryk de Rosen (John) (1891–1982) was a Polish artist and patriot who created murals and mosaic works in churches and shrines, including the Shrine of the Immaculate Conception, St. Matthew’s Cathedral and the Washington National Cathedral. A monument in his honor, designed by sculptor Gordon Kray, stands on the Avenue of the Meritorious at the Częstochowa Shrine in Doylestown, PA.
- George N. Saegmuller (1847–1934) inventor of astronomical instruments
- Ellen Isham Schutt (1873–1955), botanical illustrator for the U.S. Department of Agriculture
- Romuald Spasowski (1921–1995), Polish ambassador to the United States and defector
- Francis Eugene Worley (1908–1974) US Congressman from Texas
- Lewis Elmer Worsham, Jr. (1917–1990) was an American professional golfer, the U.S. Open champion in 1947.
