= Brian Pohanka =

American historian (1955–2005)

- Born: March 20, 1955; Washington, D.C., U.S.
- Died: June 15, 2005 (aged 50); Alexandria, Virginia, U.S.
- Resting place: Columbia Gardens Cemetery; Arlington, Virginia, U.S.
- Education: Dickinson College
- Occupations: Military historian and preservationist
- Spouse: Marylynne "Cricket" Bauer
- Writing career
- Genre: American Civil War

Brian Caldwell Pohanka (March 20, 1955 – June 15, 2005) was an American Civil War author, historian, and preservationist.

== Early life ==
Brian Caldwell Pohanka was born on March 20, 1955, in Washington, D.C., to John Pohanka. He graduated from Sidwell Friends School in Washington, D.C. He graduated with a history degree from Dickinson College in 1977.

== Career ==
Pohanka consulted for Civil War related films, such as Glory and Cold Mountain. He also made a brief and uncredited appearance as Union general Alexander S. Webb in the 1993 film of the battle of Gettysburg.

Pohanka advised on popular television documentaries, such as Civil War Journal on The History Channel and the Ken Burns documentary The Civil War. In addition, he was a reenactor and living historian, serving for over a decade as Captain of Company A of the 5th New York Volunteer Infantry, also known as "Duryée's Zouaves." He also attended annual reenactments at Gettysburg and the Little Bighorn.

Pohanka was named Battlefield Preservationist of the Year in 2004 by the Civil War Preservation Trust and the Central Virginia Battlefields Trust.

== Death ==
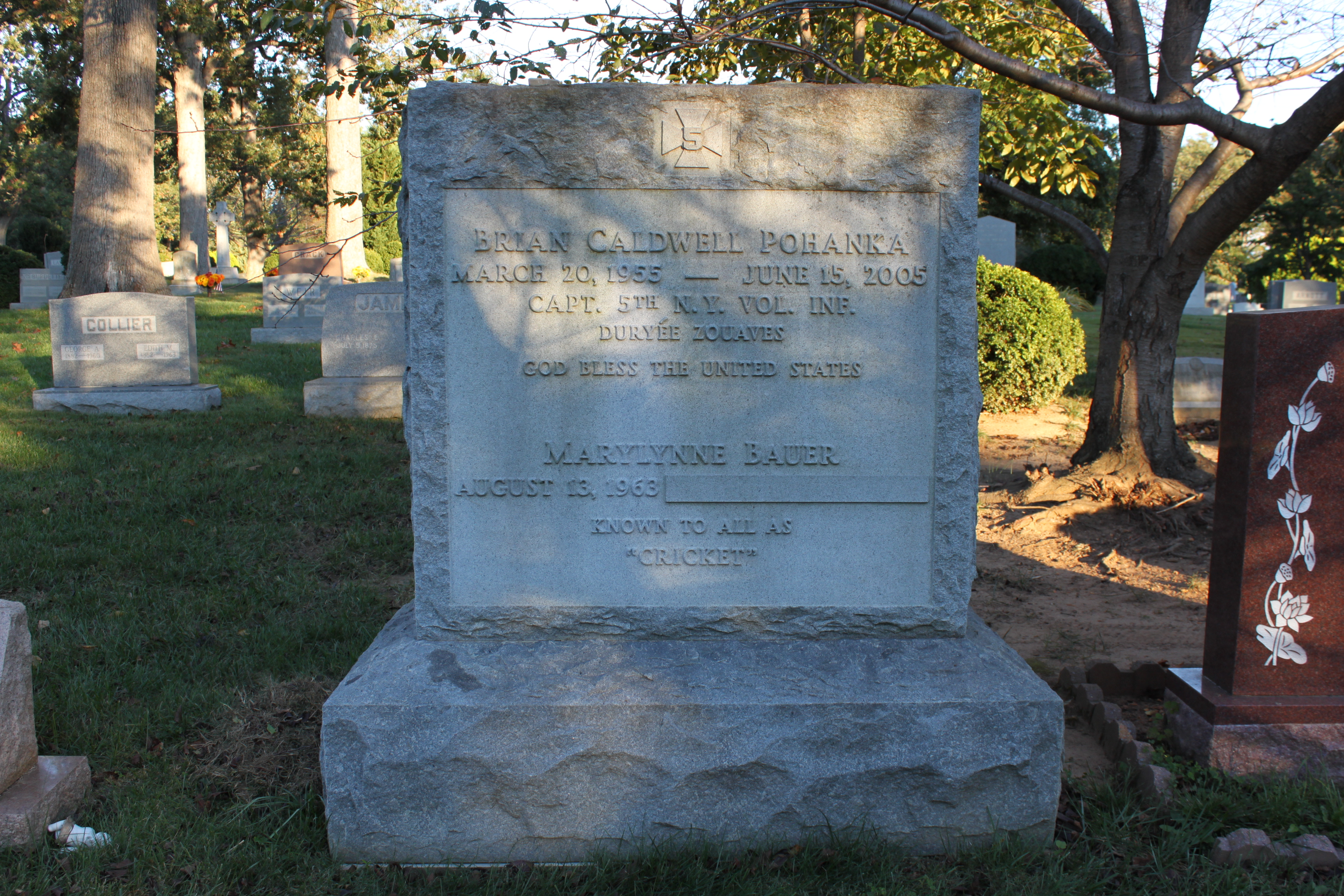
Grave of Pohanka at Columbia Gardens Cemetery

Pohanka married Marylynne "Cricket" Bauer on May 8, 1999.

Pohanka died of melanoma on June 15, 2005, at his home in Alexandria, Virginia. He was buried at Columbia Gardens Cemetery in Arlington, Virginia.

== Legacy ==
In 2006, Dickinson College created a Faculty Chair in American Civil War History position in his memory, which has been held by history professor and noted Abraham Lincoln scholar Matthew Pinsker. In 2011, Gettysburg College created a Student Summer Internship program in his memory, which as of 2024 has served more than 100 students.

== Published works ==
- "Where Custer Fell: Photographs of the Little Bighorn Battlefield Then and Now", University of Oklahoma Press, 2007 – Co-author, with James S. Brust and Sandy Barnard.
- "A Summer on the Plains with Custer's 7th Cavalry: The 1870 Diary of Annie Gibson Roberts", Schroeder Publications, 2004.
- "The Soldier's View: The Civil War Art of Keith Rocco", Military History Press, 2004 – Contributor.
- "Civil War Journal: The Leaders", Gramercy, 2003 – Editor, with William C. Davis and Don Troiani.
- "Billy Heath: The Man Who Survived Custer's Last Stand", Prometheus Books, 2003 – Author, with Vincent J. Genovese.
- "A Duryee Zouave", Schroeder Publications, 2002 – Author, with Thomas P. Southwick and Patrick A. Schroeder.
- "Campaigns of the 146th Regiment New York State Volunteers", North Country Books, 2000 – Introduction.
- "Don Troiani's Civil War", Stackpole, 1999 – Author, with Don Troiani.
- "Nor Shall Your Glory Be Forgot: An Essay in Photographs", St Martins Press, 1999 – Introduction.
- "Civil War Journal: The Legacies", Rutledge Hill Press, 1999 – Editor, with William C. Davis and Don Troiani.
- "Civil War Journal: The Battles", Rutledge Hill Press, 1998 – Editor, with William C. Davis and Don Troiani.
- "Portraits of the Civil War", Barnes & Noble, 1998 – foreword.
- Schroeder, Patrick A. "We Came to Fight: The History of the 5th New York Veteran Volunteer Infantry Duryee's", North Country Books, 1998 – Introduction.
- "With the Fire Zouaves at First Bull Run: The Narrative of Private Arthur O. Alcock, 11th New York Volunteer Infantry", Regiments: A Journal of the American Civil War, Vol. 5, No. 4, 1997 – Editor (Map by Mark A. Moore).
- "The Reno Court of Inquiry: Abstract of the Official Record of Proceedings", Stackpole, 1995 – Introduction, with William A. Graham.
- "Mapping the Civil War: Featuring Rare Maps from the Library of Congress", Fulcrum Publishing, 1992 – Author, with Christopher Nelson and the Library of Congress Geography and Map Division.
- "Myles Keogh: An Irish Dragoon in the 7th Cavalry", Upton & Sons, 1991 – Editor, with John P. Langellier and Kurt Hamilton Cox.
- "Nelson A. Miles: A Documentary Biography of His Military Career, 1861–1903", Arthur H. Clark, 1986 – Editor.
- Time-Life Books,
  - The Civil War series (27 Volumes) – Researcher, writer, and adviser, 1983–87.
  - Voices of the Civil War series (18 Volumes) – Researcher, writer, and consultant, 1995–98.
  - "An Illustrated History of the Civil War: Images of an American Tragedy" – Co-author, with William J. Miller, 2000.
  - "Great photographs of the Civil War" – Co-author, with Neil Kagan, 2003.
