= Robert Beacham Dillaway =

American aeronautical engineer

- Born: November 10, 1924; Washington, D.C., U.S.
- Died: June 11, 2015 (aged 90); Fairfax, Virginia, U.S.
- Resting place: Columbia Gardens Cemetery; Arlington, Virginia, U.S.
- Education: University of Michigan (BS); University of Illinois Urbana-Champaign (MS, PhD)
- Occupation: aeronautical engineer
- Employer(s): North American Aviation (1953-1964); U.S. Navy (1968); U.S. Army (1969-1975); Consolidated Diesel Electric Company
- Spouse: Beverly Hercer
- Children: 3

Robert Beacham Dillaway (November 10, 1924 – June 11, 2015) was an American aeronautical engineer and executive. He was involved in developing missile rocket engines for the Atlas Missile program and the Apollo missions.

== Early life ==
Robert Beacham Dillaway was born on November 10, 1924, in Washington, D.C., to Ida Louise (née Clark) and Robert Gardiner Dillaway. He graduated from the University of Michigan with a Bachelor of Science in mechanical engineering and math in 1945. He graduated from the Grainger College of Engineering at the University of Illinois Urbana-Champaign with a Master of Science in physics in 1951 and a PhD in mechanical engineering in 1953. He was a member of Pi Mu Epsilon.

== Career ==
Dillaway taught engineering courses at the University of Illinois and Stanford University. He also taught at the University of California, Berkeley.

Dillaway joined North American Aviation as a senior engineer in 1953. While at North American Aviation, he was involved in its Rocketdyne division and helped design early missile rocket engines for the Atlas Missile program and engines for the Apollo missions. He became the director of space propulsion systems and worked there until 1964.

In 1968, Dillaway moved to Northern Virginia to join the U.S. Navy as Deputy Director of the Office of Program Appraisal under the U.S. Secretary of the Navy. From 1969 to 1975, Dillaway served as the Deputy for Laboratories with the U.S. Army's Army Materiel Command. While there, he directed U.S. Army research and development for the Bell XV-15 and the Bell Boeing V-22 Osprey.

In 1976, Dillaway served as a science consultant and the chief of the oversight task team on the Committee on Science and Technology in the U.S. House of Representatives.

Dillaway also was the senior vice president of Consolidated Diesel Electric Company.

He was a member of the International Astronautical Federation (IAF), and helped draft work record rules in the IAF World Congress for crewed space flight. He also held office in the National Aeronautics Association (NAA), American Institute of Aeronautics and Astronautics and the American Society of Mechanical Engineers. He became a fellow of the American Society of Mechanical Engineers in 1972. He also became a fellow of the American Institute of Aeronautics and Astronautics.

== Personal life ==
Dillaway was married to Beverly Hercer. Together, they had three sons: Ronald, Blair and R. Keith.

== Death ==
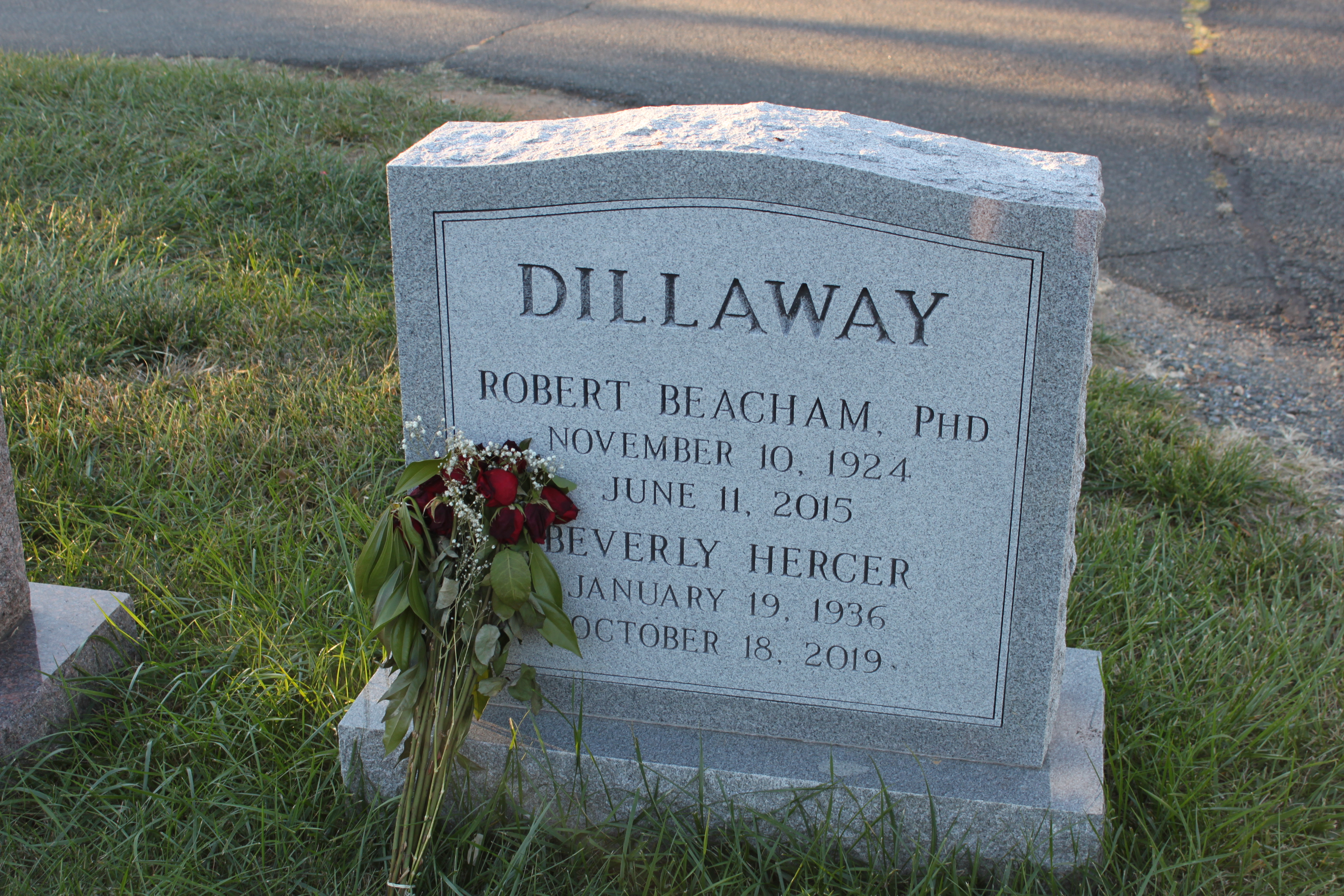
Grave of Dillaway and his wife at Columbia Gardens Cemetery

Dillaway died on June 11, 2015, from complications from Alzheimer's disease in Arden Court of Fair Oaks in Fairfax, Virginia. He was buried at Columbia Gardens Cemetery in Arlington, Virginia.

== Awards and legacy ==
Dillaway received the Donovan Scholar Award and the NAA Editorial Award.

He is on the Wall of Honor at the National Air and Space Museum in Washington, D.C.
