= Yeti Holdings =

American manufacturing company

YETI Holdings, Inc.
- Type: Public
- Traded as: NYSE: YETI; S&P 400 component
- ISIN: US98585X1046
- Founded: 2006; 20 years ago
- Founders: Ryan and Roy Seiders
- Headquarters: Austin, Texas, U.S.
- Products: Coolers, drinkware, gear
- Revenue: ▲US$1.87 billion (2025)
- Net income: ▼US$165 million (2025)
- Website: yeti.com

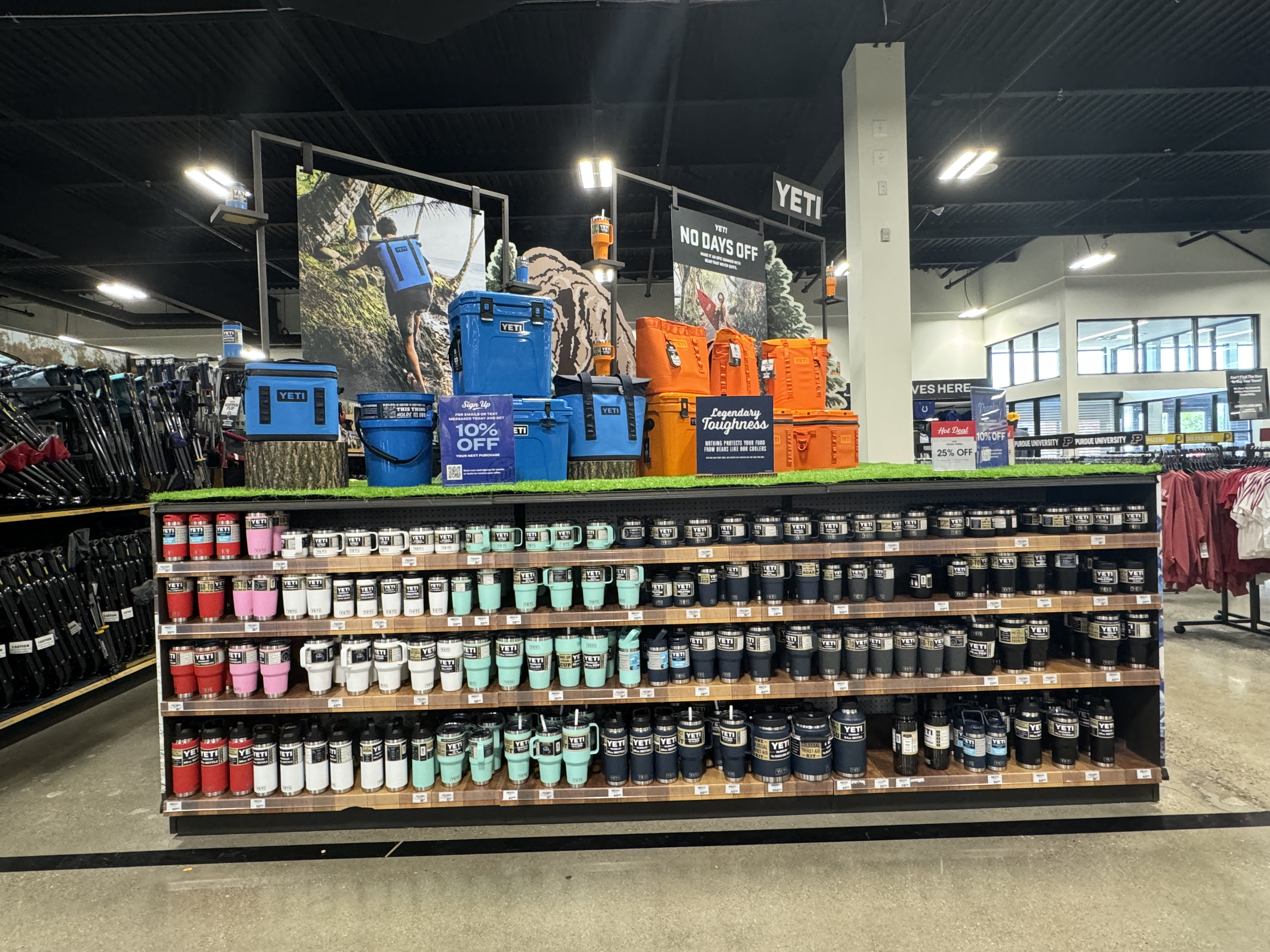
A display of Yeti products at Academy Sports + Outdoors in Indianapolis, Indiana.

YETI Holdings, Inc. is an American brand of outdoor recreation products, headquartered in Austin, Texas, specializing in outdoor products such as ice chests, vacuum-insulated stainless-steel drinkware, soft coolers, dry bags, and related accessories.

== History ==
Yeti was founded by Roy and Ryan Seiders in 2006. Their father Roger Seiders had designed a fishing rod epoxy. Ryan graduated from Texas A&M University in 1996 and Roy graduated from Texas Tech University in 2000.

In 2006, Ryan started Waterloo Rods and sold the company nine years later, in 2016. Roy, an angler and hunter, began his career making custom boats designed for shallow-depth fishing off the Texas Gulf Coast.

In June 2012, a two-thirds stake of the company was purchased by private equity firm Cortec Group for $67 million.

In July 2016, the company filed with the Security and Exchange Commission for an initial public offering with plans to list on the New York Stock Exchange under the "YETI" symbol. The company was seeking a valuation of $5 billion and hoped to raise $100 million, but retracted the IPO two years later, in March 2018, citing "market conditions".

On February 23, 2017 YETI opened its first flagship store in Austin, Texas. Today, YETI has opened over 20 stores across the United States.

As of January 8, 2018, YETI was a sponsor of the Professional Bull Riders and the YETI "Built for the Wild" event.

On October 25, 2018, YETI became a public company via an initial public offering of 16 million shares at a price of $18 per share.

On November 4, 2020, YETI initiated a consumer product safety recall for over 240,000 Rambler mugs, manufactured in China, for what the U.S. Consumer Product Safety Commission described as "Injury and Burn Hazards". The commission explained that the magnetic slider on the lid could malfunction and hot contents could spill. The product was sold in stores and through the company's website during October that year.

On February 2, 2024, YETI Holdings, Inc. completed the acquisition of Mystery Ranch, a Bozeman, Montana-based manufacturer of high-performance load-bearing backpacks, for approximately $36.2 million.

== Products ==
The company targets niche markets of high-end hunting and fishing enthusiasts, outdoorsmen, beach goers, and water enthusiasts. YETI sponsored professional outdoors-men and hunting and fishing shows.

=== Coolers ===
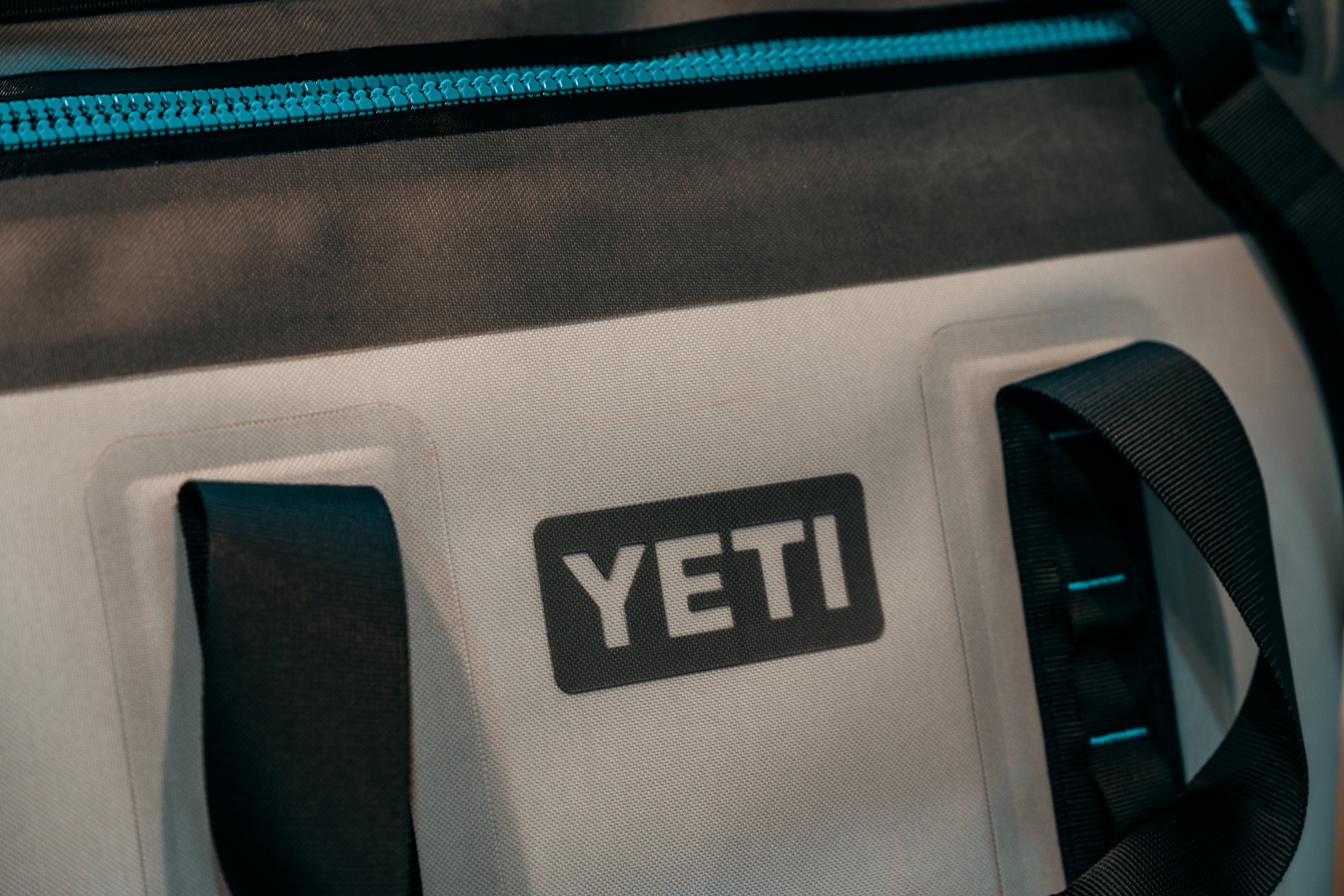
Yeti Hopper bag

The Tundra range can be locked with two padlocks, making it certified bear-resistant according to the Interagency Grizzly Bear Committee.

YETI also makes soft-sided coolers called the "Hopper" series.

Their most expensive one is 82 gallons and sells for $1,300. The brothers teamed up with a factory in the Philippines to create an "indestructible cooler", with superior ice retention.

=== Other products ===
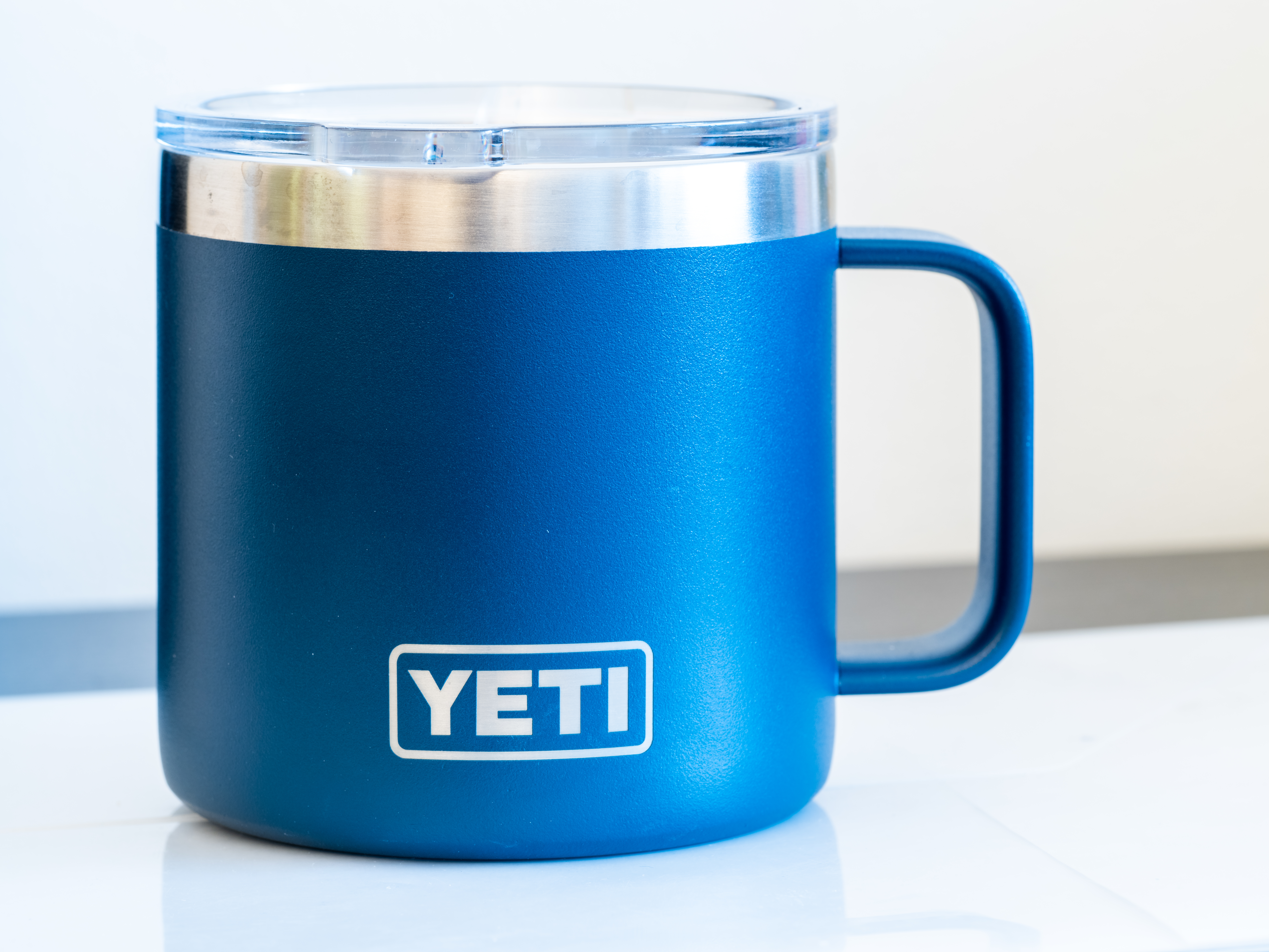
Yeti Rambler Mug (14 oz)

YETI also sells drinkware, apparel, bags, and miscellaneous outdoor gear. YETI sells drinkware products under the "Rambler" line ranging from 10 ounces to one gallon in size. The company also makes an ice bucket called the "YETI Tank".

== Sales ==
YETI sells their products to various retailers such as Academy Sports and Outdoors, Bass Pro Shops, and other retailers including Amazon Marketplace, West Marine, Cabela's, REI, Dicks Sporting Goods, and North 40 Outfitters.

YETI's sales increased from $147.7 million in 2015 to $468.9 million in 2016. YETI's earnings in 2015 were $14.2 million and in 2016 were $72.2 million. YETI's DTC sales accounted for "30% of revenue in 2017". Yeti's revenue increased to $1.127 billion for fiscal year 2025.

== Accolades ==
Outside magazine calls Yeti's Rambler "the best mug ever made". Field & Stream stated that the release of Yeti's Base Camp Chair officially declared the company's "dedication to a comfy derrière". Business Insider calls them "a status symbol in the United States".

== See also ==
- Vacuum flask
