= Dilloway =

Dilloway is a surname. Notable people with the surname include:

- Aaron Dilloway (born 1976), American musician
- Charles Dilloway (born 1781), English cricketer
- John Dilloway (1798–1869), English cricketer
- Margaret Dilloway, American novelist

== See also ==
- Dallaway
- Dillaway
