= George N. Saegmuller =

American inventor (1847–1934)

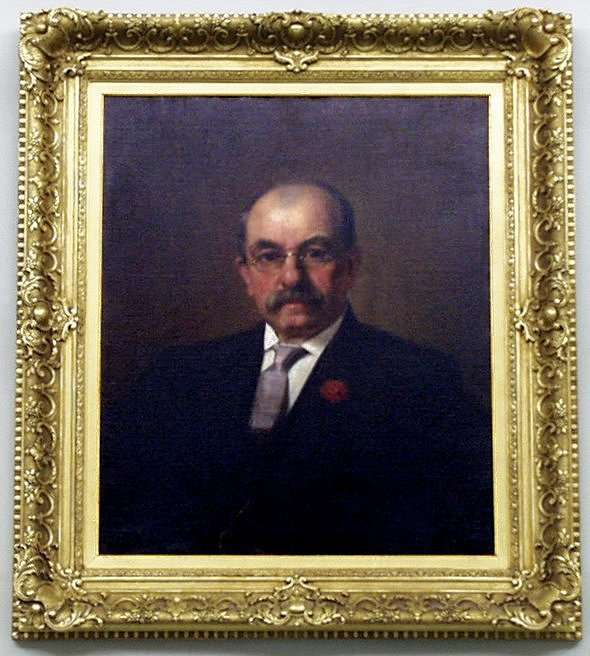
- Born: February 12, 1847; Bavaria
- Died: February 12, 1934 (aged 87); Arlington, Virginia, U.S.
- Resting place: Columbia Gardens Cemetery; Arlington, Virginia, U.S.
- Occupations: engineer; inventor; instrument maker
- Notable work: USNO 12" refractor

George N. Saegmuller (1847 - 1934) was an American inventor of many astronomical instruments and other mechanical devices.

== Early life ==
Saegmuller attended technical schools in Erlangen and Nuremberg. In 1870 he moved to the United States, where he settled in Washington, D.C., and began working for a craftsman involved in the production of astronomical and geodetic instruments. He also worked for the United States Coast and Geodetic Survey in charge of precision instruments.

== Personal life ==
Saegmuller married Maria Jane Van den Bergh while living in Washington and lived on the Van den Bergh family farm, Reserve Hill, in Arlington County, Virginia. Saegmuller was involved in many different scientific pursuits including road maintenance and water wheel pumps. He worked with Camill Fauth in the scientific equipment supply business.

== Career ==
Saegmuller invented or contributed to the development of a multitude of devices. He held more than 35 patents. His inventions include the solar attachment for engineering transits, a new type of naval bore sight, and numerous telescopes and telescope mounts.

Saegmuller, as part of Fauth & Co., joined with Bausch & Lomb Optical Company in 1905.

== Death ==
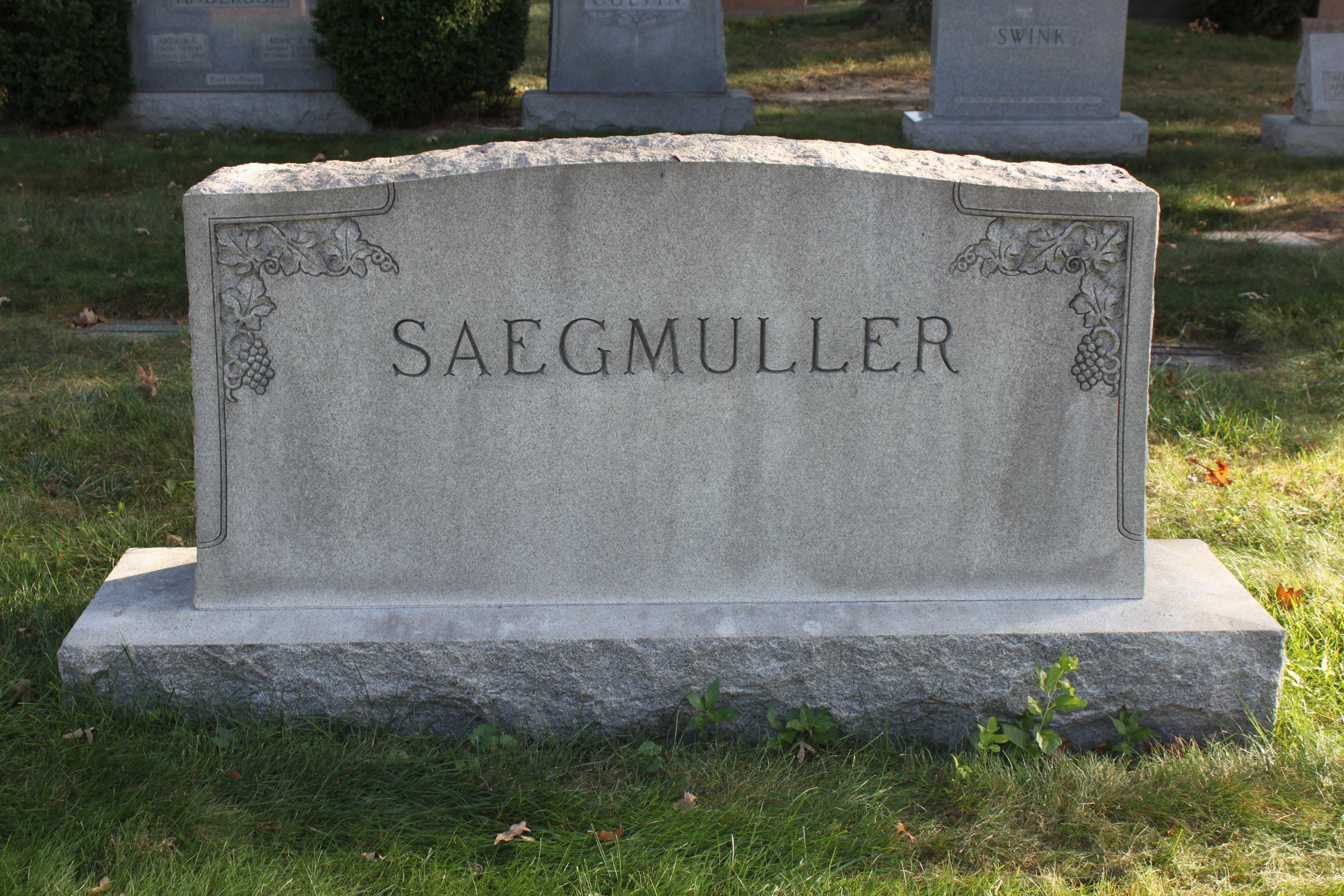
Grave of Saegmuller in Columbia Gardens Cemetery

He died on February 12, 1934, in Arlington, Virginia. He is buried in Columbia Gardens Cemetery in Arlington.

== See also ==
- List of astronomical instrument makers
