= Dallaway =

Dallaway is a surname. Notable people with the surname include:

- Andrea Dallaway (born 1970), British canoer
- James Dallaway (1763–1864), British antiquary, topographer, and writer

== See also ==
- Mrs Dalloway, novel by Virginia Woolf
- Dillaway, surname
- Dilloway, surname
