= Cortec Group =

American private equity firm

Coordinates: 40.752778°N 73.974063°W

- Company type: Private company
- Industry: Private equity
- Founded: 1984
- Headquarters: New York City, United States
- Products: Investments
- Total assets: $7.7 billion
- Website: www.cortecgroup.com

Cortec Group is an American private equity firm founded in 1984 and based in New York City. The firm specializes in investing in middle-market companies, primarily focusing on healthcare, consumer products, value-added distribution, and specialty services sectors in the United States and Canada.

== Investment strategy ==
Cortec targets middle-market, entrepreneur-owned companies, partnering with their management teams to enhance growth, profitability, and operational efficiency. Since its establishment, Cortec has raised eight institutional funds totaling over $7.7 billion in capital commitments.

== Fundraising and performance ==
In 2019, Cortec Group successfully closed its seventh fund, Cortec Fund VII, raising $2.1 billion within two months of initiating fundraising.As of 2023, Cortec aimed to raise $2.5 billion for its eighth fund. According to third-party performance data, Cortec consistently ranks within the top quartile or decile among similar private equity funds.

A noteworthy success for Cortec was its investment in YETI Holdings, reportedly returning over 26 times invested capital to limited partners.

== History ==
Cortec Group was founded in 1984 by Scott Schafler, Gerald Rosenberg, and Neal Kayes. Schafler was the son of Norman I. Schafler, the founder of Condec Corporation, originally Consolidated Diesel Electric Company, an industrial conglomerate founded in 1942.

Since 1999, the firm was co-led by Scott Schafler, David Schnadig, and Jeff Lipsitz. After raising Fund VII in 2019, Schafler transitioned to the role of Founding Partner, and the firm is currently led by Co-Presidents David Schnadig and Jeffrey Lipsitz.

In March 2025, Cortec was recognized as a top performer in the 2024 HEC Paris Dow Jones Private Equity Performance Ranking for the third consecutive year.

== Assets ==
- Cortec VII:
  - Groundworks
  - Enthusiast Auto Holdings
- Cortec VI:
  - Center for Vein Restoration
  - Chauvet
  - EVP EyeCare
  - Groome Transportation
  - Window Nation
  - Aspen Medical Products
  - Rotating Machinery Services
  - Companion Pet Partners
  - Lap of Love Veterinary Hospice
- Cortec V:
  - YETI
  - Harmar
  - Barcodes Inc.
  - Canadian Hospital Specialties
  - Weiman Products
  - Vidaris
  - Urnex
  - Community Veterinary Partners
