= Catholic High School of Baltimore =

Private, all-girls school in Baltimore, Maryland, US

The Catholic High School of Baltimore
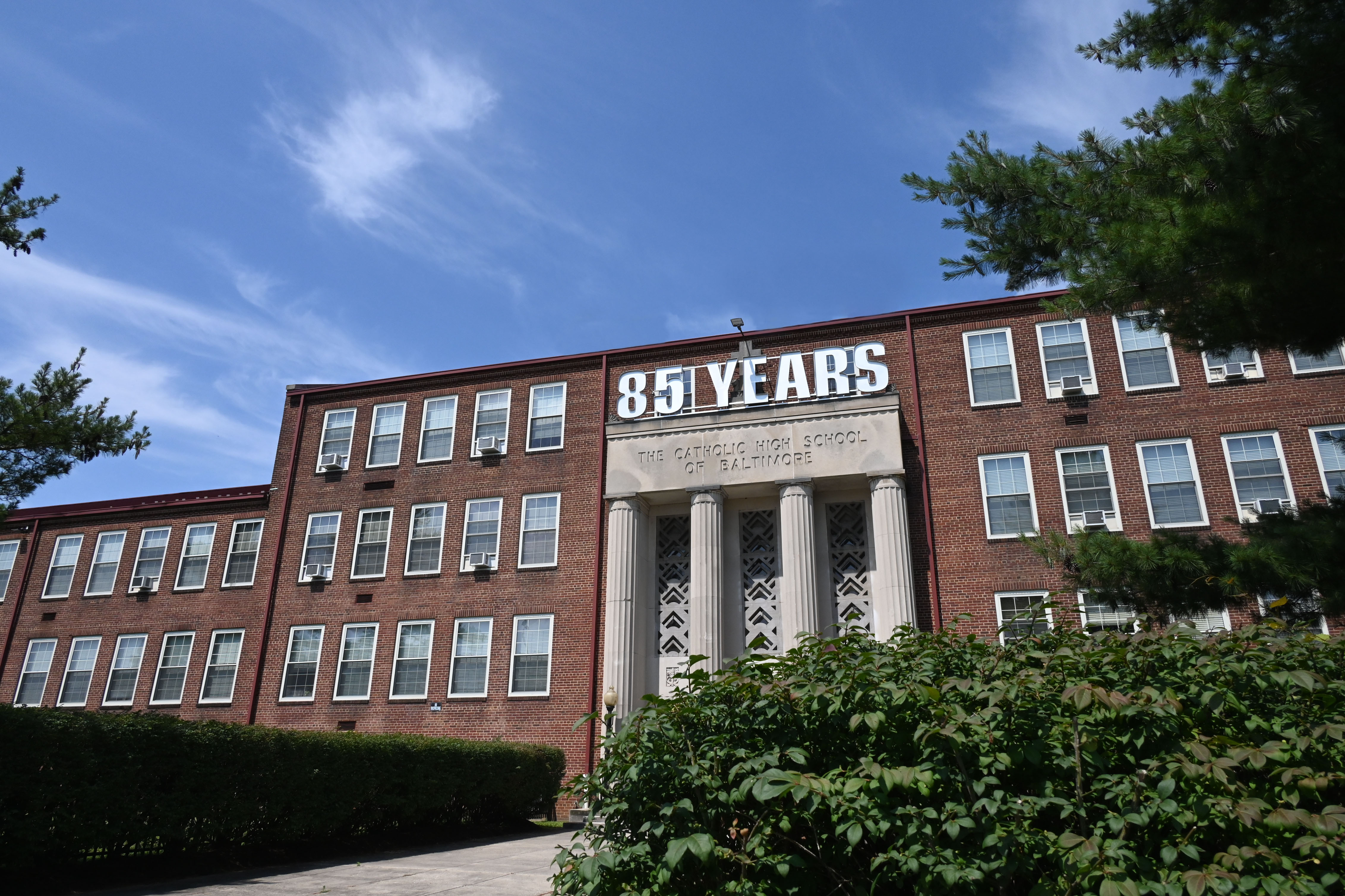

Location
- 2800 Edison Highway; Baltimore, MD; Baltimore, (Baltimore County), Maryland 21213; United States; 39°18′57.5″N 76°34′24.4″W

Information
- Type: Private, All-Girls
- Motto: Lux Tua Luceat (Let Your Light Shine)
- Religious affiliation: Catholic Church
- Patron saints: St. Francis of Assisi and St. Clare of Assisi
- Established: 1939
- President: Ms. Natalia Mistichelli '90
- Principal: Mr. Scott Derosier
- Grades: 9–12
- Student to teacher ratio: 12:1
- Colors: Green and gold
- Slogan: Empowering Women
- Song: Viva Catholic High
- Athletics conference: IAAM
- Mascot: Teddy
- Team name: Cubs
- Accreditation: Middle States Association of Colleges and Schools & Association of Independent Maryland & DC Schools
- Publication: Canticles (literary magazine)
- Newspaper: The Highway
- Yearbook: The Troubadour
- Tuition: $18,400 + fees
- Website: thecatholichighschool.org

The Catholic High School of Baltimore is an independent, private, all-girls, Catholic high school in Baltimore, Maryland, sponsored by the Sisters of St. Francis of Philadelphia.

== History ==
Through the efforts of Archbishop of Baltimore Michael Joseph Curley and Provincial Superior of the Sisters of St. Francis Mother Mary Generosa McCafferty, the Catholic High School of Baltimore was built in 1939 on the property known as the Raming Estate. The intended name of the school was "The Curley High School of Baltimore," however Curley disliked having a school named after himself. Instead, he exchanged the word "Curley" for "Catholic."

== Academics ==
=== Overview ===
The Catholic High School uses a 4.0 scale for GPA. It also uses a grading system different from the one most commonly seen in United States high schools.

Grading System
Letter	Percentage	GPA
A+	100-97	4.0
A	96-93	4.0
B+	92-89	3.5
B	88-85	3.0
C+	84-81	2.5
C	80-77	2.0
D+	76-73	1.5
D	72-70	1.0
F	Below 70	0

Quarterly academic achievements are recognized using Gold and Silver Honors. A 3.75 GPA and no grade beneath a B+ are needed for Gold Honors. A 3.5 GPA and no grade beneath a B are needed for Silver Honors.

=== Honor societies ===
The Catholic High school is currently associated with eight honor societies: National Honor Society (The Mother Generosa Chapter), National Art Honor Society, National Dance Honor Society, National English Honor Society (Sister Corda Marie Bergbauer Chapter), National Science Honor Society, French Honor Society, Spanish Honor Society, and Tri-M Music Honor Society.

=== Programs ===
==== Honors Program ====
The Honor Program is designed to provide students with more challenging and rigorous academic courses. Students in this program will be enrolled in honors-level classes and can take Advanced Placement (AP) classes. Dual-enrollment courses are also offered for juniors and seniors, allowing students to earn college credit.

==== College Preparatory Program ====
The College Preparatory Program prepares students for college and future careers.

==== Archangel Program ====
The Archangel Program is a two-year program assisting freshmen and sophomores with academic difficulties.

==== Law and Leadership Program ====
The Law and Leadership Program is a four-year program focusing on responsible leadership, ethics, and the legal system. Leadership in the Franciscan tradition is emphasized, and classes such as Public Speaking and Criminal Justice are taken.

==== STEM Program ====
The STEM Program is a four-year program with a specialized focus in the areas of science, technology, engineering, and mathematics. There are three concentrations for this program: Engineering, Biomedicine, and Sports Medicine.

==== The McCafferty Visual and Performing Arts (VPA) Program ====
The McCafferty VPA Program is a four-year program with five concentrations. Students in this program have the opportunity to build portfolios, participate in regional competitions, have their art shown in exhibitions, and perform at Catholic High events. There are five concentrations for this program: Art, Band, Choir, Dance, and Theatre.

== Leadership ==
Ms. Natalia Mistichelli ’90 was appointed as the second President of The Catholic High School of Baltimore in 2026. She succeeded Dr. Barbara D. Nazelrod ’68, who served as President from 2001 to 2026.

Principals
Time Period	Name
1939 - 1942	Sr. Sylvia Mockenhauptk, OSF
1942 - 1949	Sr. Mary Ignacita Tyrrell, OSF
1949 - 1955	Sr. Mary Zacharia Dietz, OSF
1955 - 1967	Sr. M. Lucetta Mulherin, OSF
1967 - 1971	Sr. Miriam Rose Baldwin, OSF
1971 - 1973	Sr. Janice Marie Hallacher, OSF
1973 - 1982	Sr. John Catherine Rohe, OSF
1982 - 1989	Sr. Mary Catherine Lewandowski, OSF
1989 - 1992	Sr. Evelyn Dougherty, OSF
1992 - 2001	Sr. Janet Thiel, OSF
2001 - 2003	Mr. John Sposato
2003 - 2004	Mr. John Abrahms
2004 - 2010	Mr. Keith Harmeyer
2010 - 2011	Ms. Madelyn Ball
2011 - 2015	Mrs. Marti Meyd
2015 - 2022	Mrs. Sharon Johnston
2023 - 2025	Dr. Philip Piercy
2025 - present	Mr. Scott Derosier

== Extracurricular activities ==
=== Athletics ===
The athletic philosophy of the Catholic High School emphasizes the importance of physical conditioning and training as well was the development of sportsmanship, self-discipline, and healthy competition. All teams, with the exception of Cheerleading, are a part of the Interscholastic Athletic Association of Maryland.

Fall Sports
Sport	Varsity Conference	JV Conference
Cross Country	B	-
Field Hockey	C	-
Soccer	B	-
Volleyball	B	B

Winter Sports
Sport	Varsity Conference	JV Conference
Basketball	C	C
Cheerleading	-	-
Indoor Track	B	B
Swimming	B	-

Spring Sports
Sport	Varsity Conference	JV Conference
Golf	B	-
Lacrosse	C	-
Outdoor Track	B	-
Softball	B	B

=== Clubs and Councils ===
The Catholic High School of Baltimore offers a variety of clubs to promote diverse interests, including Barbershop Club, Beautiful Me Club, Chess Club, Duns Scotus Forensics Society, Green School Club, Marine Environmental Club, Mathletes, Media Club, Model UN, Nurse's Club, Sea Perch Robotics, STEP Team, TCHS-TV, VEX Robotics, and Youth and Government.

The school also has councils such as the Culture and Diversity Council, Human Trafficking Cohort, and Student Council, which provide platforms for leadership development, school and community engagement, and personal growth.

== Traditions ==
=== Hello Day ===
Hello Day is an annual tradition where seniors (Big Sisters) welcome the freshmen (Little Sisters) and transfer students (Cub Buddies) to the school. Each senior is paired with a freshman. The day begins with the Big Sisters, Little Sisters, and Cub Buddies gathering in the Dining Hall where each Little Sister and Cub Buddy receives a basket of presents from her Big Sister. Afterwards, the entire student body enters the auditorium to watch skits performed by students and staff.

=== Junior Ring ===
Early in the school year, the members of the Junior Classes are given their class rings during the Junior Ring Liturgy. During the liturgy, the rings and the class are blessed.

=== Senior bows ===
Rising seniors are provided with green ribbon bows they wear on their kilts. These bows are adorned with the various pins and honors the student has received during her time at Catholic High.

=== Dances and proms ===
Several dances and proms occur throughout the school year. The Snow Ball is a dance sponsored by the Student Council held in January for the entire student body.

The sophomore, junior, and senior classes each have an exclusive dance or prom. The sophomore class has a semi-formal dance held at Catholic High, while both the junior and senior classes have proms held off-campus.

=== Miss Catholic High and Students of the Year ===
At the end of every school year, one student from each class is chosen to be their respective Student of the Year. The senior Student of the Year is referred to as Miss Catholic High and has the honor of crowning Mary at the May Crowing Procession with the other Students of the Year in her court.

=== Senior Picnic and Farewell ===
Following senior examinations, the senior class holds a farewell event to mark the end of their time at Catholic High. The event includes a Farewell Assembly, during which students share memories and faculty members offer farewell remarks to the graduating class.

=== Sports traditions ===
==== Powder Puff game ====
The Powder Puff Game is an annual game of flag football. Members of the junior and senior classes compete against each other.

==== Pep rallies ====
Three Pep Rallies occur every year, one for each season. During a pep rally, the respective sports teams are recognized for their achievements. Games are also played for Field Day points.

==== Spirit Stick ====
The Spirit Stick is an athletic tradition where the Big Sister athletes pass it on to their Little Sister athletes that represents school spirit and competition.

==== Spirit Week and Field Day ====
Spirit Week and Field Day are celebrated in the spring. Each day of Spirit Week, students are allowed to dress down according to the theme of the day. On Friday of Spirit Week is Field Day, which is a friendly competition between each class. Each student represents their grade by wearing their specific class colors.

== Notable alumnae ==
- Margaret A. Brewer '48: First female brigadier general in Marine Corps history.
- Stacy Keibler '97: Former professional wrestler and 2nd runner-up on Dancing with the Stars, season two
- Gina Schock: Drummer for The Go-Go's

== See also ==
- List of High Schools in Maryland
- St. Francis of Assisi
- St. Clare of Assisi
