= J. Sterling Livingston =

American educator and consultant (1916–2010)

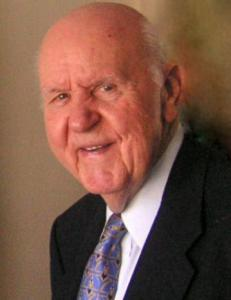
- J. Sterling Livingston in 2009
- Born: June 7, 1916; Salt Lake City, Utah, U.S.
- Died: February 14, 2010 (aged 93)
- Resting place: Columbia Gardens Cemetery; Arlington, Virginia, U.S.
- Education: Harvard Business School (MBA, PhD)
- Occupations: businessman; consultant; educator
- Spouse: Ruth Elizabeth Flume (m. 1943)
- Children: 4

J. Sterling Livingston (June 7, 1916 – February 14, 2010) was an American entrepreneur, management consultant, and professor at the Harvard Business School for 25 years.

== Early life and education ==
J. Sterling Livingston was born in Salt Lake City, Utah, on June 7, 1916, and grew up in and near Chino, Glendale and Pomona, California. He worked as a wiper on board a cargo ship, then attended Glendale Junior College, the University of Southern California and the Harvard Business School, where he received his Master of Business Administration in 1940. During the Second World War he taught the Navy Supply Corps. Following the war, he graduated with a PhD in commercial science from Harvard in 1948.

== Career ==
Livingston became a professor at Harvard University and taught for 25 years. In 1949, he founded Harbridge House, Inc., a management development and consulting firm. In December 1960, he joined Tyco as a director. In 1967, he founded Sterling Institute, a Washington, D.C.–based management and executive development program. He also founded Management Systems Corporation and Logistics Management Institute. His articles "Myth of the Well-Educated Manager" and "Pygmalion in Management" were published in the Harvard Business Review.

== Death ==
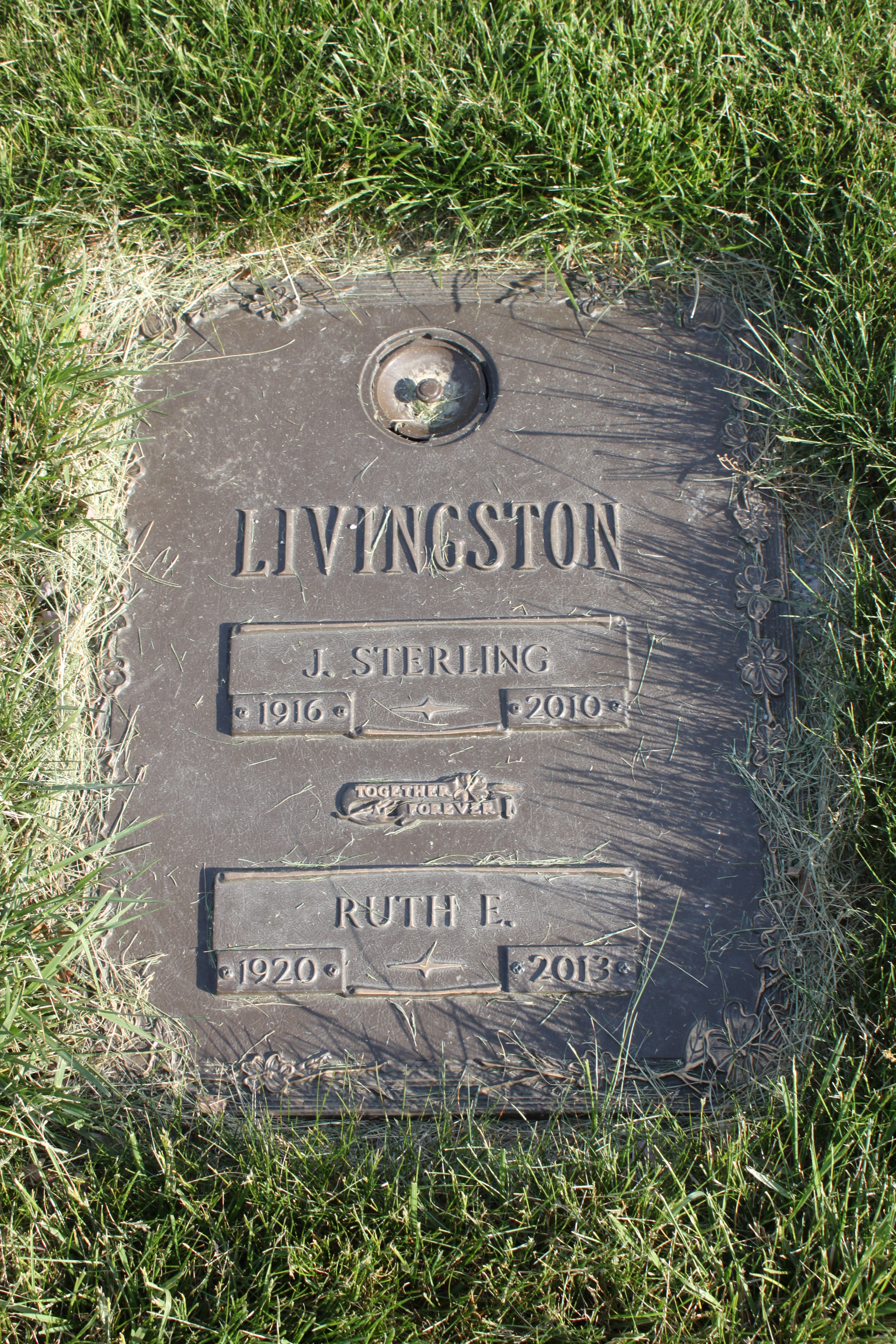
Grave of Livingston and his wife at Columbia Gardens Cemetery

Livingston married Ruth Elizabeth Flume, daughter of Albert G. Flume, on February 6, 1943. They had two daughters and two sons.

Livingston died on February 14, 2010, and was buried at the Columbia Gardens Cemetery in Arlington, Virginia.
