= Margaret A. Brewer =

United States Marine Corps general

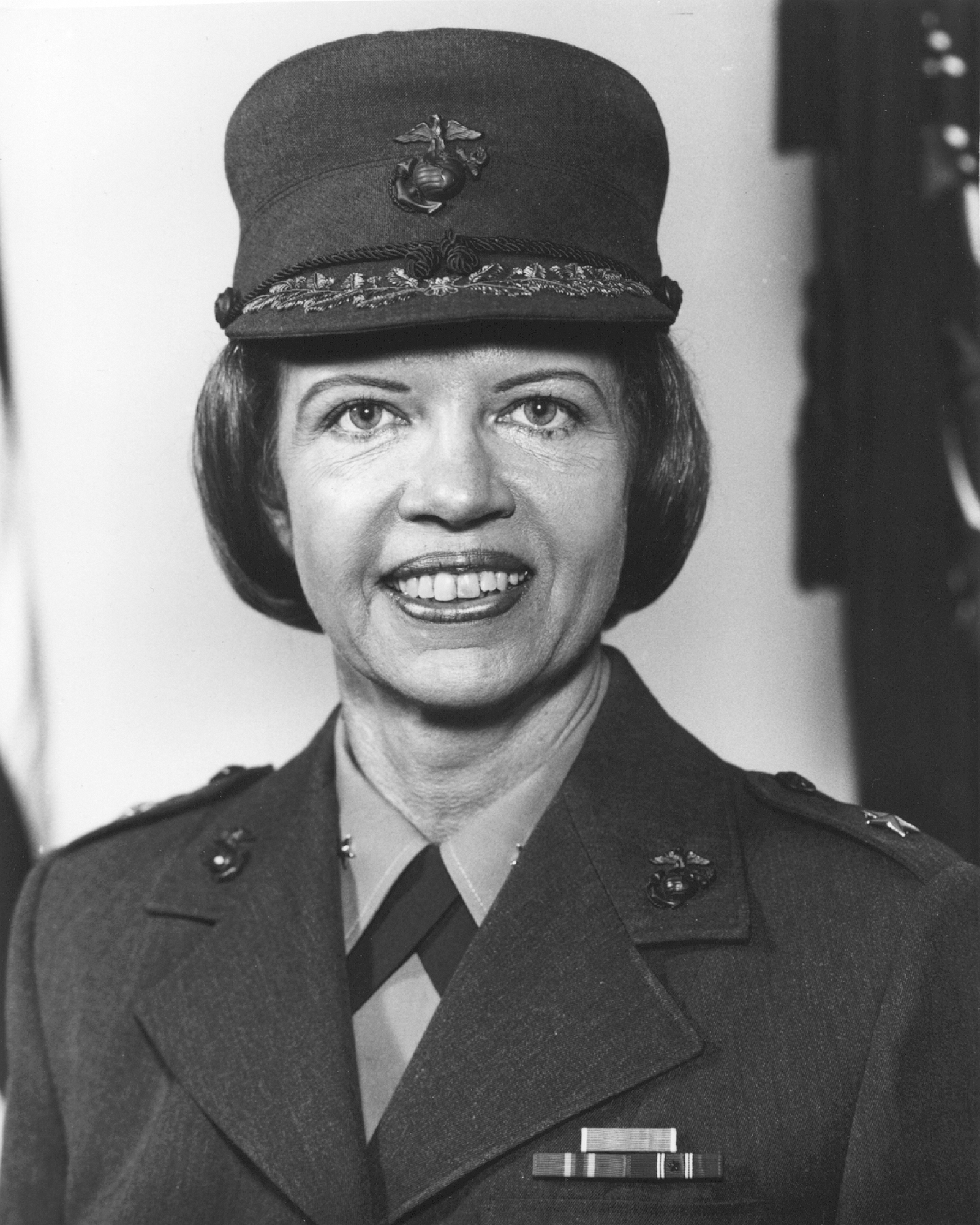
- Brigadier General Brewer
- Born: July 1, 1930; Durand, Michigan, U.S.
- Died: January 2, 2013 (aged 82); Springfield, Virginia, U.S.
- Burial place: Columbia Gardens Cemetery; Arlington, Virginia, U.S.
- Education: University of Michigan
- Military career
- Allegiance: United States
- Branch: United States Marine Corps
- Service years: 1952–1980
- Rank: Brigadier General
- Commands: Women Marines, Norfolk, Virginia; Women Marines, Camp Lejeune; Woman Officers School; Director of Women Marines; Director of Information; Director of Public Affairs
- Awards: Legion of Merit (2)

Margaret A. Brewer (July 1, 1930 – January 2, 2013) served as a brigadier general in the United States Marine Corps. She was the first woman in the Marine Corps to reach general officer rank, which occurred on May 11, 1978.

== Early years ==
Brewer was born in Durand, Michigan, on July 1, 1930, to Maurice and Anne Brewer. Her parents divorced early in her life. Her ancestors on her fathers' side were early settlers of Michigan and are buried near Bishop Airport in Flint, Michigan. Brewer received her primary education in Michigan, attending Ryno School in Clayton Township, Genesee County in 1936. She later graduated from the Catholic High School in Baltimore, Maryland, prior to entering the University of Michigan at Ann Arbor. She received a bachelor's degree in geography in 1952, and was a member of Zeta Tau Alpha sorority. She completed officers training in Quantico, Virginia, during the summers after her second and third years in college at UM.

== Marine Corps career ==
Brewer was commissioned a second lieutenant in the United States Marine Corps 1952. Her first assignment was at the Marine Corps Air Station El Toro, California, where she served as a communications watch officer until June 1953. She was then transferred to Brooklyn, New York, for a two-year tour as Inspector-Instructor of a Women Marine Reserve unit.

From September 1955 until June 1958, then Captain Brewer served successively as Commanding Officer of the Women Marine companies at Norfolk, Virginia, and Marine Corps Base Camp Lejeune, North Carolina. During the 18 months following, she was a platoon commander for woman officer candidates at Marine Corps Base Quantico, Virginia, during summer training sessions, and for the balance of the time, a woman officer selection officer with headquarters in Lexington, Kentucky.

Transferred to Marine Corps Base Camp Pendleton, California, in November 1959, for duty with the Commissioned Officers Mess (Open), Brewer was promoted to major in September 1961 and in April 1963 returned to Quantico to serve as executive officer and later as commanding officer of the Woman Officer School. By 1966, she was the Public Affairs Officer for the 6th Marine Corps District, Atlanta, Georgia as lieutenant colonel.

Brewer served as Deputy Director of Women Marines, at Headquarters Marine Corps, from March 1968 to March 1971. She was promoted to colonel in 1970. Reporting to Quantico, she assumed duty as Special Assistant to the Director, Marine Corps Education Center. She became Chief of the Support Department, Marine Corps Education Center in June 1972, serving in this capacity until she was selected as the seventh Director of Women Marines on February 1, 1973 until 1977.

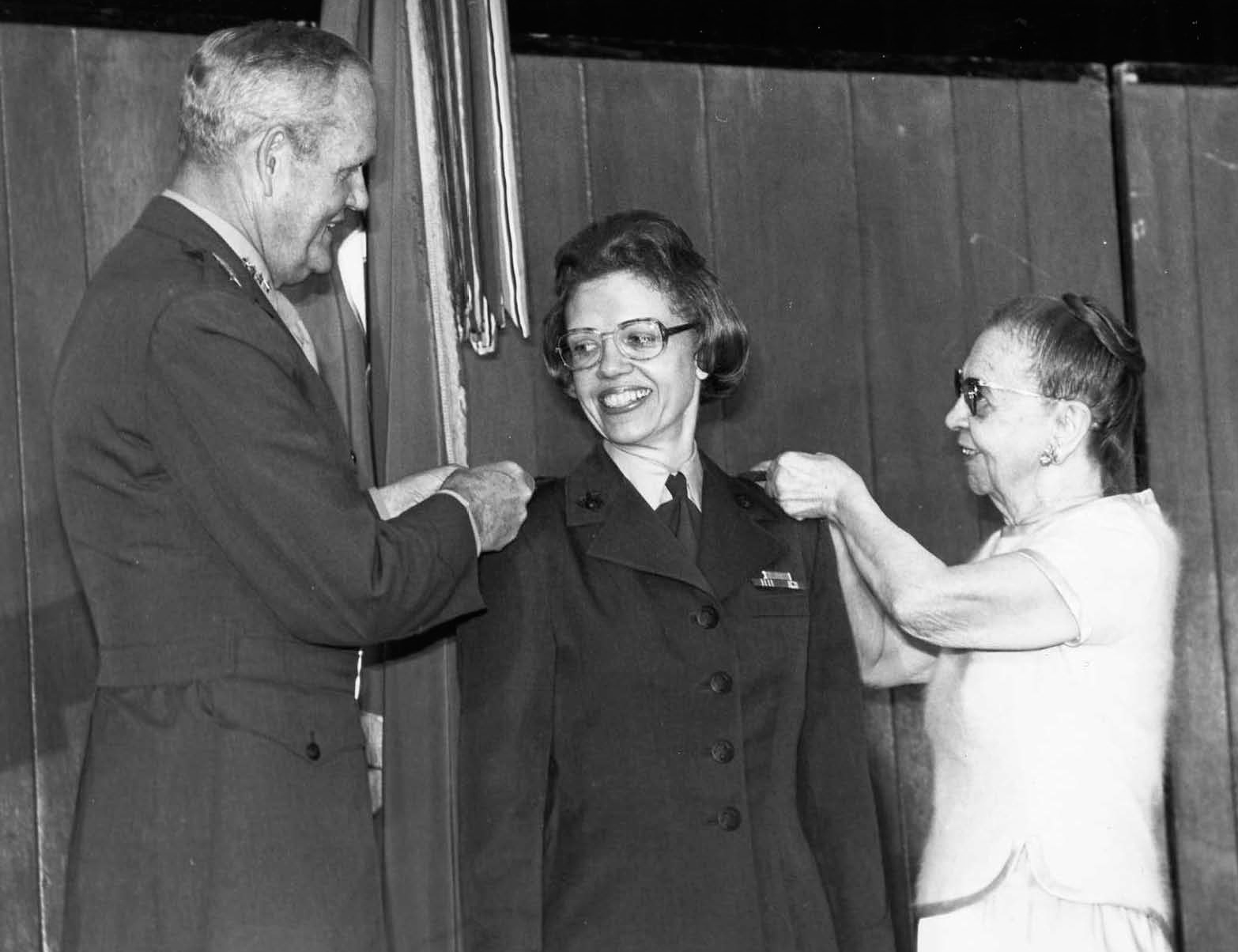
Brewer's promotion ceremony to the rank of brigadier general, May 11, 1978

On July 1, 1977, then Colonel Brewer assumed duty as Deputy Director of the Division of Information, Headquarters Marine Corps, when the Director of Women Marines' office was disbanded because of the strides made in integrating women into an expanded role in the Corps. For meritorious service as the Director of Women Marines, she was presented the Legion of Merit by the Commandant of the Marine Corps on June 30, 1977.

While serving as the Deputy Director of the Division of Information, Headquarters Marine Corps, Brewer was nominated to the post of Director of the Division of Information, which required a general rank. At the time, the Marine Corps did not allow women to hold the a general rank, President Carter made a special nomination to the grade of brigadier general that was approved by both house of Congress. She was appointed to that grade and assumed duty as Director of Information on May 11, 1978, at which time she became the first female general officer in the United States Marine Corps. After Brewer reorganized the division, the Division of Information was redesignated as the Division of Public Affairs, and Brigadier General Brewer's title was changed to Director of Public Affairs. Brewer retired in 1980.

== Later years and death ==
After retiring Brewer served on the boards of the Catholic Charities of Arlington County, the Marine Corps Heritage Foundation and the Catholic High School of Baltimore, where she was also the chair. She attended church at the Saint Thomas More Cathedral. She also worked towards the creation of the National Museum of the Marine Corps and the Women in Military Service for American Memorial.

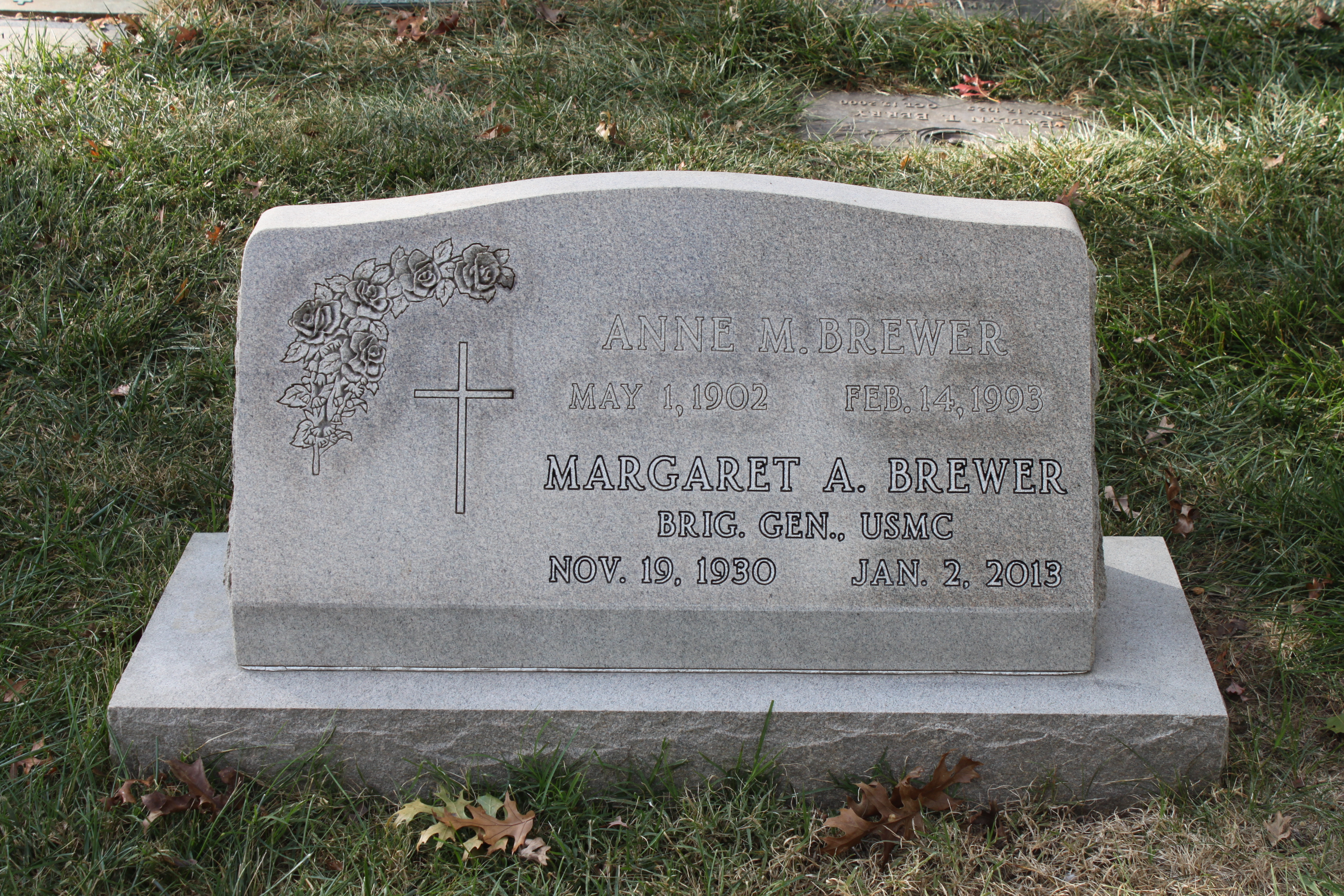
Grave of Brewer in Columbia Gardens Cemetery

Brewer died at Greenspring, a retirement home in Springfield, Virginia on January 2, 2013, of Alzheimer's disease. She had no surviving immediate family. She was interred at Columbia Gardens Cemetery.

== Awards ==

Legion of Merit w/ 1 award star	Navy Meritorious Unit Commendation	National Defense Service Medal w/ 1 service star

== See also ==
- United States Marine Corps Women's Reserve
- List of female United States military generals and flag officers

== Notes ==
Military offices
Preceded by Jeanette I. Sustad	Director of Women Marines; 1973–1977	Succeeded by none
