= Lap of Love Veterinary Hospice =

- Type: Privately held company
- Industry: Service
- Founded: Lutz, Florida, USA 2009, incorporated 2011
- Number of locations: Operations in 37 states with over 350 veterinarians in total
- Website: https://www.lapoflove.com/

Lap of Love Veterinary Hospice is a family-centered veterinary hospice and in-home animal euthanasia service, recognized as the first organized group of its kind in America. The company is a member of the International Association for Animal Hospice and Palliative Care, and it operates in 37 states.

== History ==
In 2009 Lap of Love was founded by Dr. Dani McVety, a graduate of University of Florida College of Veterinary Medicine, after spending several months working in a traditional veterinary emergency room and recognizing the growing demand for end-of-life services to be performed at home. Shortly thereafter, McVety teamed up with Dr. Mary Gardner, a fellow UF grad, with the hope of developing a model for pet hospice and at-home animal euthanasia services that could be taught to other veterinarians. Lap of Love was incorporated in 2011, and began offering franchises in 2012.

In 2015, the company was awarded the University of Florida Entrepreneurship Award, given by the Center for Entrepreneurship & Innovation.

== Services ==
Animals seen by Lap of Love veterinarians are either geriatric or terminally ill patients. Hospice and palliative care includes phone and in-home consultations on a pet's appetite, hydration, mobility, wound care, and pain management. The company also offers an online Pet Hospice Journal which includes a quality of life scale, and a diary to help the pet owner track daily health issues. Should natural death not appear to be imminent when an animal is suffering or exhibiting signs of a degraded quality of life, pet owners may elect for at-home euthanasia services by Lap of Love veterinarians, and burial or cremation arranged through the company.

McVety and Gardner have authored several seminars and videos relating to the human-animal bond and compassionate medicine, and both have appeared nationally at public speaking engagements, including the 2012 North American Veterinary Conference.
