= Ashton Heights Historic District =

Historic district in Virginia, United States

- U.S. National Register of Historic Places
- U.S. Historic district
- Virginia Landmarks Register
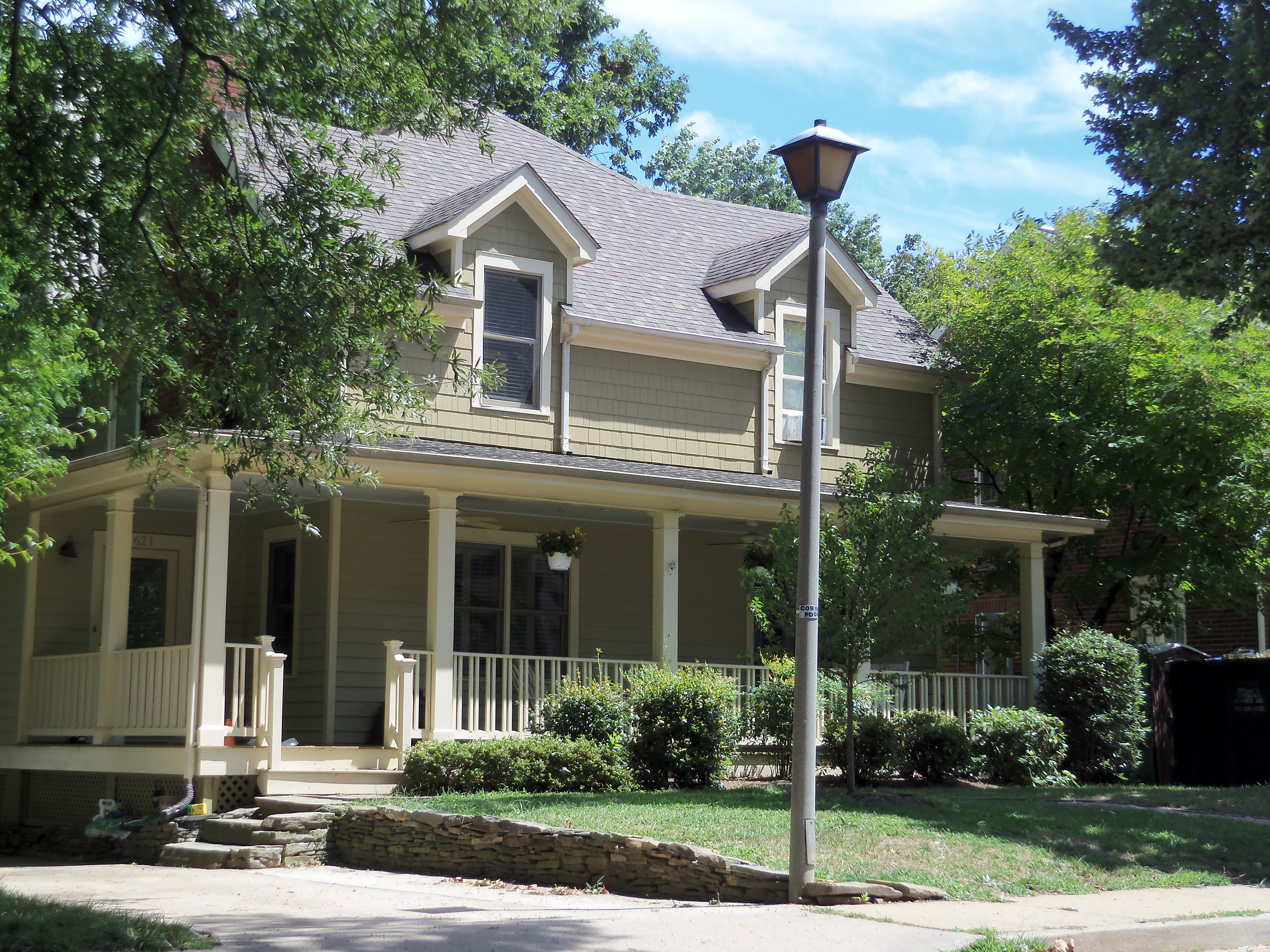

- Location within District of Columbia Location within Virginia Location within the United States
- Location: Roughly bounded by Lorcom Ln., N. Utah and N. Taylor Sts., and I-66, Arlington, Virginia
- Coordinates: 38°53′41″N 77°6′32″W
- Area: 220.6 acres (89.3 ha)
- Built: 1911
- Architect: Multiple
- Architectural style: Queen Anne, Colonial Revival, et al.
- NRHP reference No.: 03000561
- VLR No.: 000-7819

Significant dates
- Added to NRHP: June 23, 2003
- Designated VLR: December 4, 2002

Ashton Heights Historic District is a national historic district located in Arlington County, Virginia. Today, the Ashton Height Historic District contains 1,097 contributing buildings, one contributing site, and one contributing structure in a residential neighborhood in North Arlington.

== History ==
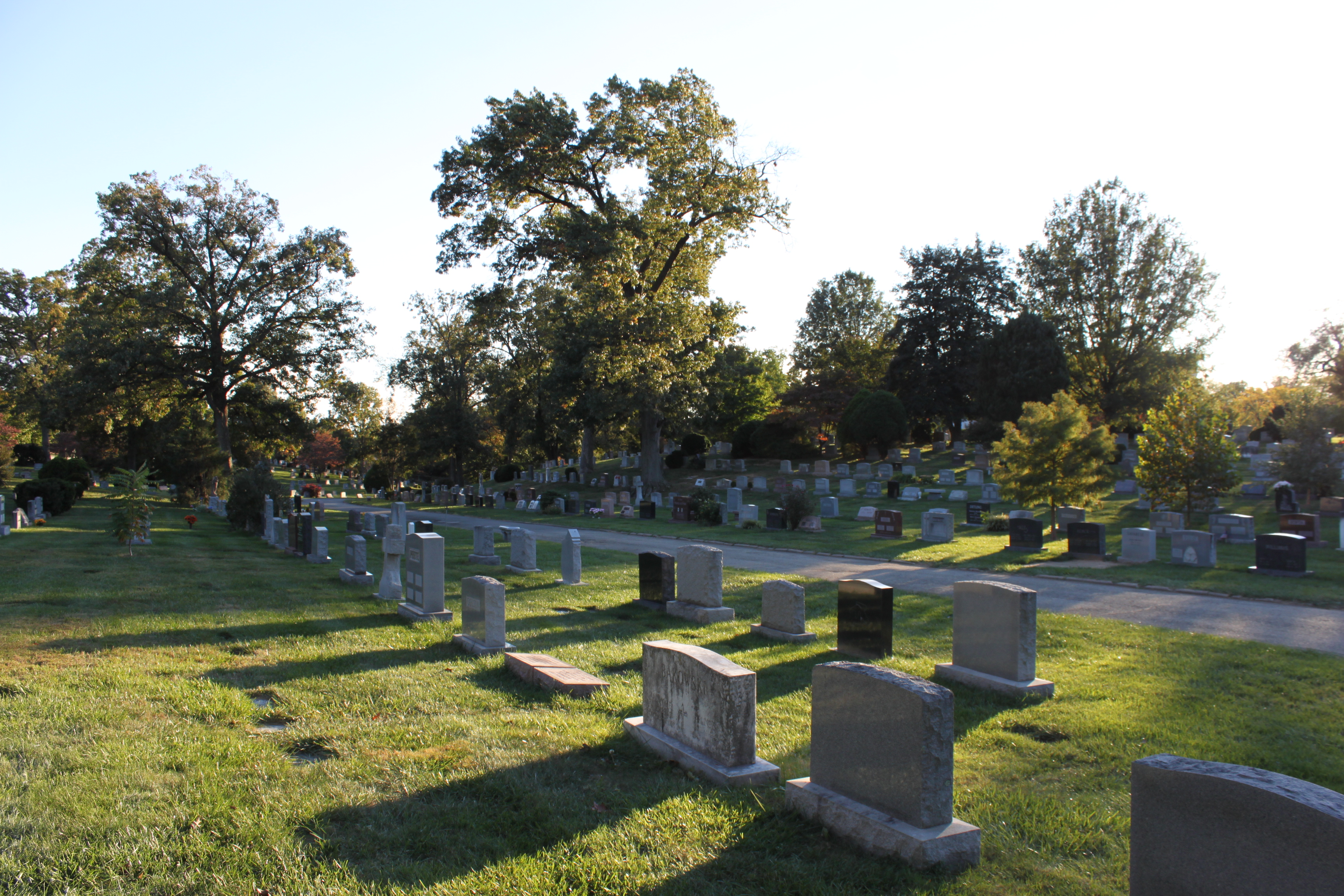
Columbia Gardens Cemetery, contributing site of the Ashton Heights Historic District

The Ashton Heights Historic District was once owned by Major Bushrod Hunter (b. 1807). Hunter also owned Brookdale and Abingdon Plantation, now Reagan National Airport, near the Pentagon and Arlington National Cemetery. The area was first platted and subdivided in 1921. The dwelling styles include a variety of architectural styles, Single-family dwellings built prior to 1950, primarily in the Bungalow / Craftsman and Colonial Revival styles, dominate the neighborhood, with some notable earlier Queen Anne style dwellings. The district includes a number of multiple-family apartment buildings, three churches, the Women's Club of Ashton Heights, and Columbia Gardens Cemetery. Also located in the district is the separately listed Clarendon School.

It was listed on the National Register of Historic Places in 2003.
