= Colonel (United States) =

Military rank of the United States

- Colonel insignia. Style and method of wear may vary between different uniforms and different service branches.

- Shoulder boards
- Country: United States
- Service branch: United States Army; United States Marine Corps; United States Air Force; United States Space Force
- Abbreviation: COL (Army); Col (Marine Corps, Air Force, and Space Force)
- NATO rank code: OF-5
- Pay grade: O-6
- Next higher rank: Brigadier general
- Next lower rank: Lieutenant colonel
- Equivalent ranks: Captain in the other uniformed services which use naval ranks

Subdued insignia as worn on the current USMC Combat Utility Uniform and previously worn on the former Desert Camouflage Uniform and Battle Dress Uniform.

A colonel (/ˈkɜːrnəl/) in the United States Army, Marine Corps, Air Force, and Space Force is the most senior field-grade military officer rank immediately above the rank of lieutenant colonel and just below the rank of brigadier general. Colonel is equivalent to the naval rank of captain in the other uniformed services. (Note: The other United States uniformed services include the United States Navy, United States Coast Guard, United States Public Health Service Commissioned Corps, and National Oceanographic and Atmospheric Administration Commissioned Officer Corps.) By law, an officer previously required at least 22 years of cumulative service and a minimum of three years as a lieutenant colonel before being promoted to colonel. With the signing of the National Defense Authorization Act of 2019 (NDAA 2019) Public Law 115 - 232, military services now have the authorization to directly commission new officers up to the rank of colonel. The pay grade for colonel is O-6.

When worn alone, the insignia of rank seen at right is worn centered on headgear and fatigue uniforms. When worn in pairs, the insignia is worn on the officer's left side while a mirror-image reverse version is worn on the right side, such that both of the eagles' heads face forward, to the wearer's front.

== Insignia ==
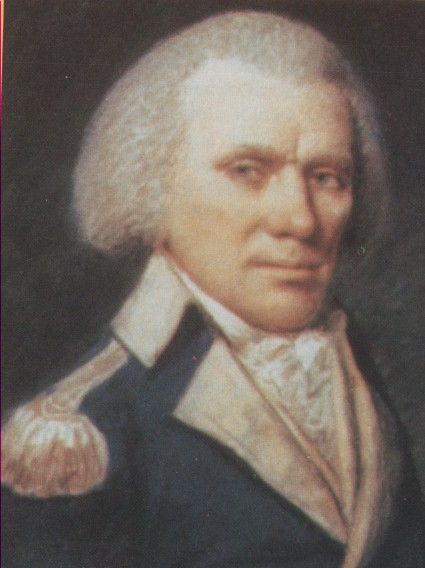
William Few in the uniform of a Continental Army colonel

The insignia for a colonel is a silver eagle which is a stylized representation of the eagle dominating the Great Seal of the United States (which is the coat of arms of the United States). As on the Great Seal, the eagle has a U.S. shield superimposed on its chest and is holding an olive branch and bundle of arrows in its talons. However, in simplification of the Great Seal image, the insignia lacks the scroll in the eagle's mouth and the rosette above its head. On the Great Seal, the olive branch is always clutched in the eagle's right-side talons, while the bundle of arrows is always clutched in the left-side talons. The head of the eagle faces towards the olive branch, rather than the arrows, advocating peace rather than war. As a result, the head of the eagle always faces towards the viewer's left. Some colonel eagles from the 1920s to the 1950s faced the arrows, though this is no longer done and was known as the "war eagle." The full-sized colonel eagle is 3/4 inches tall and 1 1/2 inches in diameter from the tips of each wing.

However, when worn as a single insignia with no matching pair, such as on the patrol cap, garrison cap/flight cap, or the front of the Army, Air Force, or Space Force OCP uniform, there is a split between the services on which mirror image of the eagle should be worn. In the United States Army, United States Air Force, and United States Space Force, the eagle is always worn with "the head of the eagle to the wearer's right or to the front," with the olive branch clutched in the eagle's right (or forward) hand talons (see Department of the Army Pamphlet 670-1, paragraph 21-6 [a][1]). In the United States Navy, United States Marine Corps, United States Coast Guard, NOAA, and the PHSCC, the eagle is worn with "the head facing forward" on the wearer's right side of the garrison cover (see Marine Corps Order P1020.34G, Uniform Regulation, paragraph 4005d[1]). Since respective service's officer insignia is worn on the left side and the rank insignia is worn on the right hand side of the Marine, Navy, Coast Guard and NOAA garrison caps, the eagle is facing to the eagle's left with the olive branch clutched in the eagle's left hand talons, which is a mirror opposite to the wear of the single eagle for Army, Air Force, and Space Force officers.

== History ==
=== Origins ===
The U.S. rank of colonel is a direct successor to the same rank in the British Army. The first colonels in the United States were appointed from colonial militias maintained as reserves to the British Army in the North American colonies. Upon the outbreak of the American Revolutionary War, colonial legislatures would grant commissions to men to raise a regiment and serve as its colonel. Thus, the first U.S. colonels were usually respected men with ties in local communities and active in politics.

Revolutionary War colonels generally raised a regiment of six to ten companies, with eight being normal. Each company would be full strength at 90 men and an 8-company regiment would have 728 men and officers.

With the post-war reduction of the U.S. Army, the rank of colonel disappeared, and was not re-introduced until 1802.

Early insignia for the rank of colonel (all field officers) was first a red or pink cockades in 1775 and then gold epaulettes worn on the blue uniform of the Continental Army in 1780.

=== 19th century ===
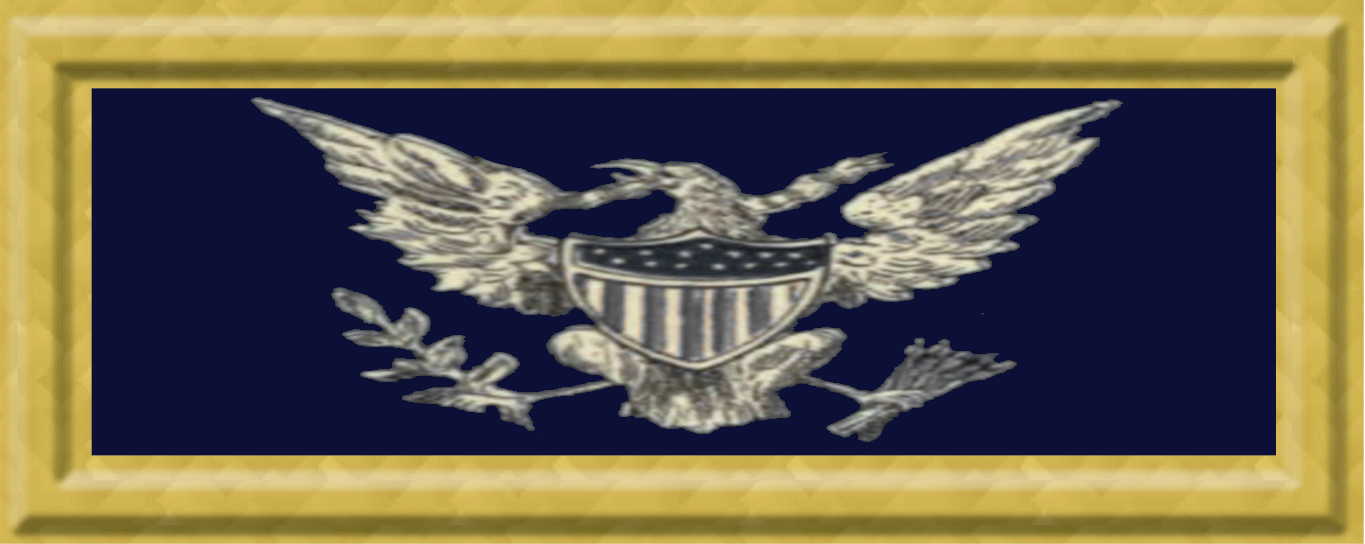
The shoulder straps of an infantry colonel in the 1860s U.S. Army (i.e. Union Army)

The rank of colonel was relatively rare in the early 19th century, partly because the U.S. Army was very small, and the rank was usually obtained only after long years of service. In 1821 there were only 11 colonels in the Army.

During the War of 1812 the Army grew rapidly and many colonels were appointed to command regiments, but most of these colonels were discharged when their regiments were disbanded at the war's conclusion. A number of other colonels were appointed by brevet – an honorary promotion usually for distinguished service in combat.

The American Civil War saw a large influx of colonels as the rank was commonly held in both the Confederate army and Union Army by those who commanded a regiment. Since most U.S. regiments were state formations and were quickly raised, the colonels in command of the regiments were known by the title "Colonel of Volunteers", in contrast to Regular Army colonels who held permanent commissions.

Civil War colonels commanded regiments that were larger than their Revolutionary War predecessors. A new regiment started with 1,000 men and officers in 10 companies.

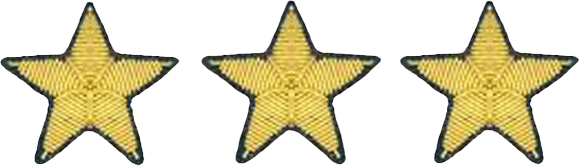
Collar insignia of a Confederate colonel

During the Civil War, the Confederate army maintained a unique insignia for colonel, which comprised three yellow stars worn on the collar of a uniform. Robert E. Lee wore this insignia due to his former rank in the United States Army and refused to wear the insignia of a Confederate general, stating that he would only accept permanent promotion when the Confederacy had defeated the U.S. and achieved its independence.

After the end of the Civil War, the rank of colonel again became rare as the forces of the United States Army downsized and became extremely small. However, many U.S. colonels were appointed in the volunteers during the Spanish–American War, prominent among them Theodore Roosevelt and David Grant Colson.

=== 20th century ===
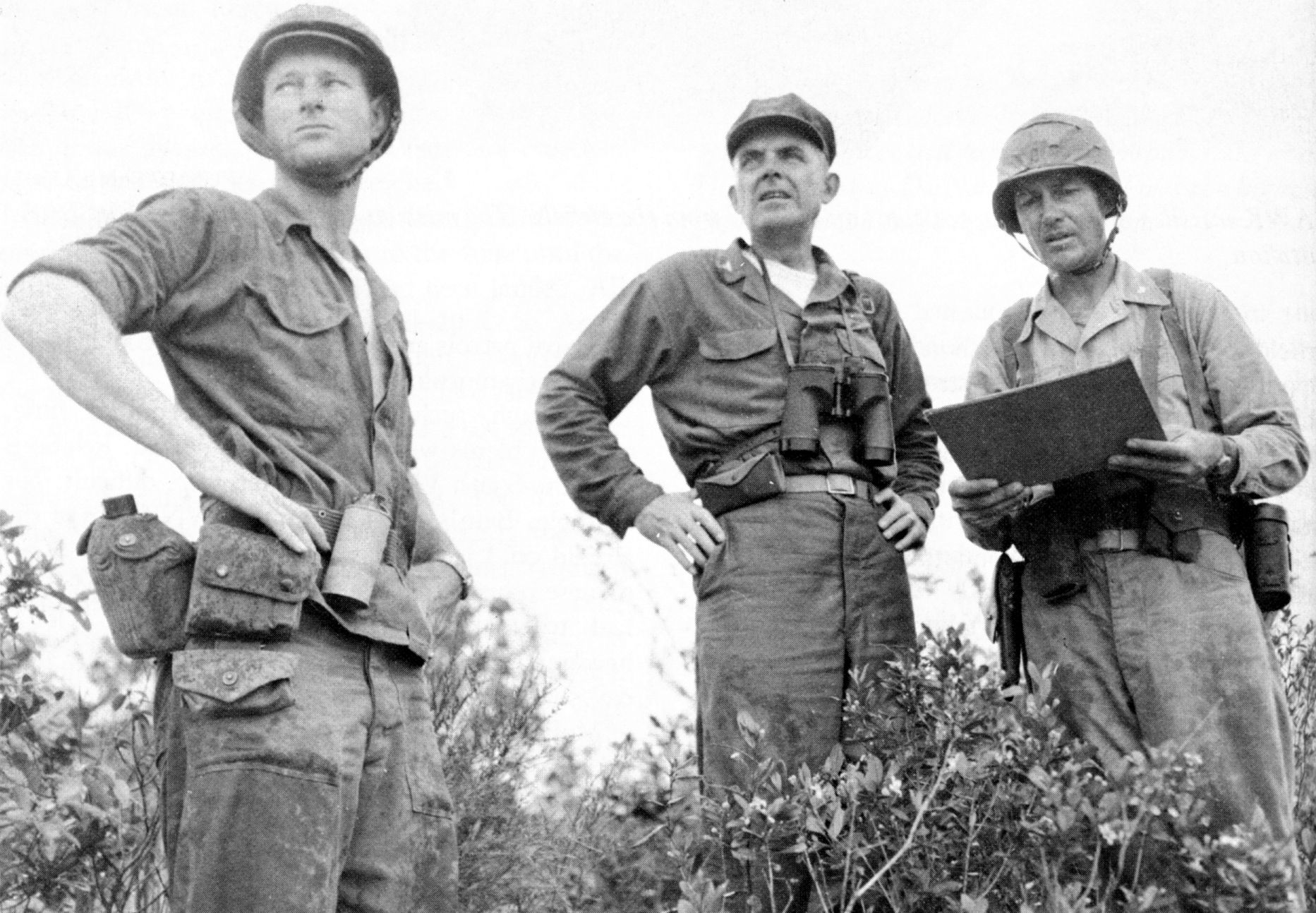
A U.S. Marine colonel (center) during the Vietnam War.

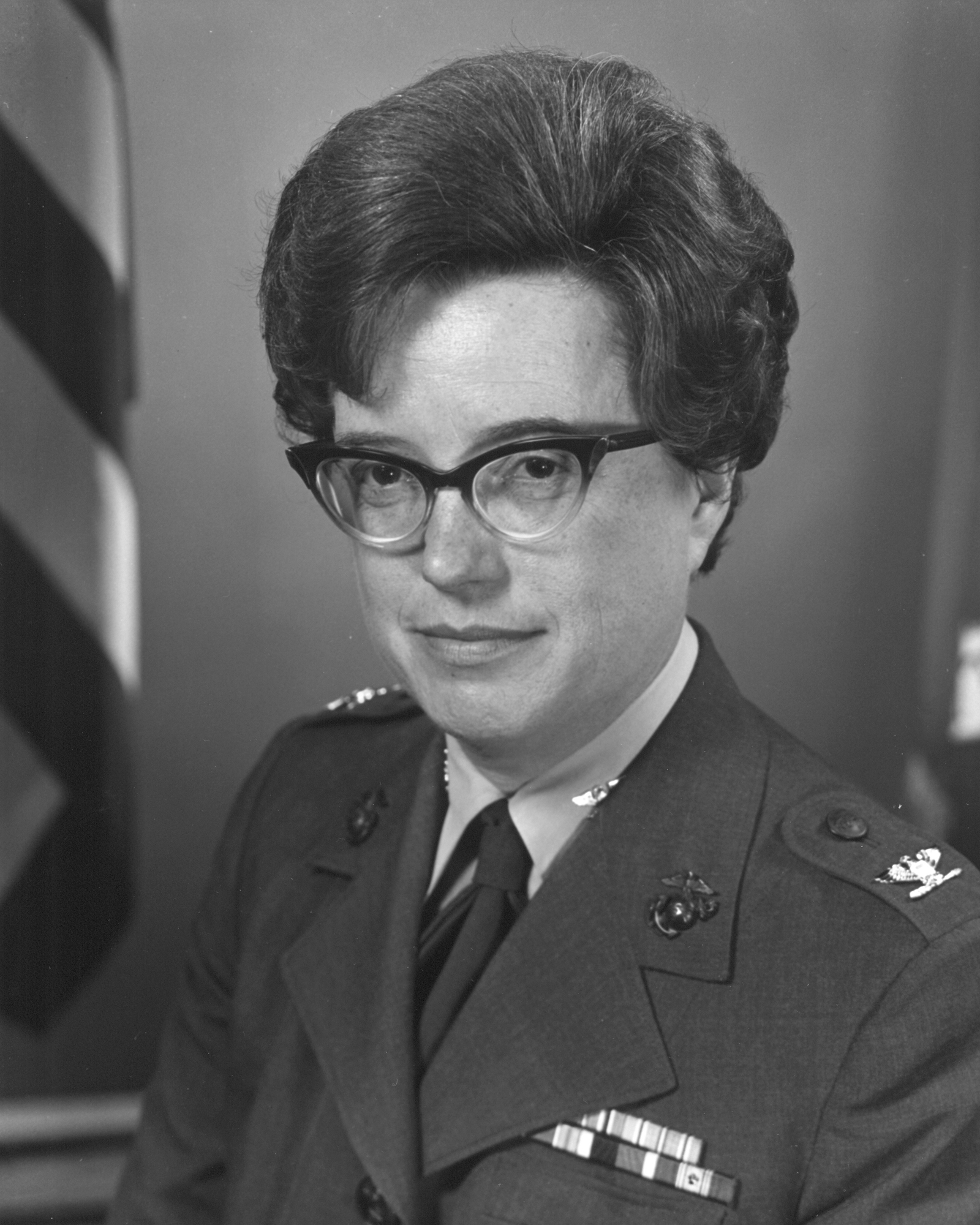
Colonel Jeanette Sustad as Director of Women Marines.

World War I and World War II saw the largest numbers of colonels ever appointed in the U.S. military. This was mostly due to the temporary ranks of the National Army and the Army of the United States, where those who would normally hold the rank of Captain in the peacetime Regular Army were thrust into the rank of colonel during these two wars.

The Military Promotion System was revised and standardized for all the services in 1980 as a result of passage of the Defense Officer Personnel Management Act.

=== 21st century ===
Contemporary U.S. colonels usually command Army infantry, artillery, armor, aviation, special forces, or other types of brigades or regiments as well as large installations; USMC regiments, Marine Expeditionary Units, Marine Aircraft Groups, or installations such as Marine Corps Bases or Marine Corps Air Stations; USAF groups or wings; and USSF deltas.

An Army colonel typically commands brigade-sized units (4,000 to 6,000 soldiers), with another colonel or a lieutenant colonel as deputy commander, a major as executive officer, and a command sergeant major as a senior non-commissioned officer (NCO) advisor.

An Air Force colonel typically commands a wing consisting of 1,000 to 4,000+ airmen with another colonel as the vice commander, four other colonels as group commanders, which are the major components of wings, and a Chief Master Sergeant (i.e., a "Command Chief") as principal senior NCO enlisted adviser. Colonels are also found leading at directorate and division levels on the Secretariat, Air Staff (United States), MAJCOM, or Numbered Air Force staff.

A Space Force colonel typically commands a delta.

Colonels are sometimes referred to (but not addressed as) full colonels, bird colonels, or full bird colonels because lieutenant colonels are also referred to and addressed in correspondence as "colonel". Referring to an "O-6", a colonel's pay grade, also may differentiate colonels and lieutenant colonels, who have a pay grade of "O-5". Officers in pay grade O-6 visiting or on temporary assignment to other installations are also accorded "Distinguished Visitor" (DV) status for lodging and other appropriate protocol honors. When flying on military aircraft as either crew or passenger, they are also accorded "Code" status as a "Code 7" in accordance with Department of Defense Flight Information Publication General Planning (DoD FLIP GP).

Most Army colonels have attended or otherwise completed via seminar or correspondence a war college or a senior staff college equivalent to study joint warfare and war itself. It is possible to make Colonel without war college if the board file is as strong or stronger than a war college graduate. Most Army colonels receive postgraduate level senior joint professional military education (JPME) at the Army War College in Carlisle, Pennsylvania prior to promotion. The 2009 graduating class was 336 including 198 army officers and the rest divided among other military branches, domestic inter-agency representatives and other foreign military leaders.

A high concentration of USAF colonels graduate from the Air War College (AWC) at Maxwell AFB, Alabama via in-residence at Maxwell AFB, while other USAF colonels complete AWC via a non-resident seminar program paralleling the in-residence program or the AWC distance learning program. Still other USAF colonels a JPME program via the National Defense University (i.e., National War College, Eisenhower School) or the program of another service (e.g., Army War College, College of Naval Warfare at the Naval War College, Marine Corps War College). The AWC resident program includes participation by officers from various other branches of the U.S. armed forces and Allied nations. Completion of the AWC or an equivalent program is a de facto requirement for promotion to colonel in the USAF, to include the Air Force Reserve and the Air National Guard.

Marine colonels may graduate from the Marine Corps War College or, like all other branches, may receive credit via non-resident attendance at another installation, via correspondence, or will be graduates of an equivalent senior JPME program sponsored by the National Defense University or one of the other U.S. military services.

== Honorary colonels ==
Some people known as "colonels" are actually recipients of honorary colonel ranks from a state governor and are not officers of the U.S. military. In the 19th century, the honorary colonels were military appointments and they still are nominally appointed to a governor's staff, but without military rights or duties. Examples of honorary colonels include Colonel Harland Sanders of KFC fame, a Kentucky colonel; Colonel Christian Umstead, US Marine, a Kentucky Colonel; Colonel Tom Parker, Elvis Presley's manager, who received the honor from a Louisiana governor; and Edward M. House, known as Colonel House, a Texas honorary colonel and adviser to President Woodrow Wilson.

== Famous colonels ==
Famous U.S. Army colonels

- Charlie Beckwith – Founder of 1st Special Forces Operational Detachment-Delta, the Army's elite top-secret special forces detachment.
- Deborah L. Birx – American physician and diplomat who served under four Presidential Administrations in various public health roles, including the HIV/AIDS task force and leading the 2020 Coronavirus Task Force.
- Anthony Brown – Lieutenant Governor of Maryland (2007–2015) and Commander of the 153rd Legal Support Organization in Pennsylvania; formerly the highest-ranking elected official in the U.S. to have served a tour of duty in the Iraq War; Co-chair of the Obama/Biden Presidential Transition Agency Review Team for the Department of Veterans Affairs.
- Joshua Lawrence Chamberlain – Union Army officer and commander of the 20th Maine Volunteer Infantry Regiment at Gettysburg.
- David Hackworth – Served in the Korean War and the Vietnam War, an author and military media consultant. Formerly the highest decorated living soldier.
- Jack H. Jacobs – Medal of Honor recipient for his actions during the Vietnam War.
- Ernest Lester Jones – First director of the United States Coast and Geodetic Survey
- Robert E. Lee – Led the raid against John Brown at Harpers Ferry. During the American Civil War he joined the Confederacy and became the General in Chief of the Armies of the Confederate States.
- W. Patrick Lang – Retired Special Forces officer, commentator on the Middle East, intelligence executive, and author
- Virgil R. Miller – Regimental commander of the 442nd Regimental Combat Team (RCT), a unit which was composed of "Nisei" (second generation Americans of Japanese descent), during World War II. He led the 442nd in its rescue of the Lost Texas Battalion of the 36th Infantry Division, in the forests of the Vosges Mountains in northeastern France.
- Harold Gregory Moore – Arguably the most famous United States Army soldier of the Vietnam War, Moore commanded the Third Brigade of the elite United States Army's First Cavalry Division during the Vietnam War after the victory at the Battle of Ia Drang in November 1965.
- William Wilson Quinn – Served under Patton during World War II and received two Purple Hearts, a Bronze Star, a Silver Star and became a Knight and Officer of the National Order of the Legion of Honor; he also was the commanding officer of the 17th Infantry during the Korean War. He participated in the Battle of the Bulge, captured Hermann Göring and arrived at Dachau the day after it was liberated. After the war Quinn played a key role in forming the CIA.
- Theodore Roosevelt – 1st United States Volunteer Cavalry Regiment, recipient of the Medal of Honor, and 26th President of the United States.
- Robert Gould Shaw – Union Army officer and commander of the African American Army Regiment, the 54th Massachusetts.
- James L. Stone – Recipient of the highest U.S. military decoration—the Medal of Honor—for his actions in the Korean War.
- Blake R. Van Leer – United States Army officer, served in both World War I and World War II, awarded the Croix de Guerre and president of Georgia Tech.

Famous USAF colonels

- Edwin Eugene "Buzz" Aldrin – USAF Command Pilot-Astronaut; during the 1969 Apollo 11 mission he became the second person to step on the Moon.
- John Boyd – Air Force fighter pilot and military strategist, known for developing EM theory (energy–maneuverability theory) and espousing the OODA loop.
- Alexander Butterfield – U.S. Air Force colonel who became an aide to President Nixon and was later appointed administrator of the Federal Aviation Administration. Cooperated with prosecutors during the Watergate scandal.
- Doug Collins – 12th United States Secretary of Veterans Affairs. Served one tour in Iraq during Operation Iraqi Freedom.
- Gail Seymour "Hal" Halvorsen – Started "Operation Little Vittles" in July 1948 (officially from September 22, 1948, to May 13, 1949) to drop candy to children in Berlin during the Berlin Airlift earning him the nickname "The Candy Bomber".
- Nicole Malachowski – U.S. Air Force colonel who became the first woman pilot of the United States Air Force Thunderbirds.
- Martha McSally – United States Air Force Command Pilot in the A-10 Thunderbolt II, first U.S. woman to fly in combat. Later a U.S. congresswoman and U.S. Senator from Arizona.

Famous USMC colonels

- Wesley L. Fox – United States Marine Corps recipient of the Medal of Honor.
- John Glenn – Marine Corps aviator, served in the Korean War, astronaut and U.S. Senator.
- Ed McMahon – United States Marine Corps Reserve aviator and television personality.
- Chesty Puller – World War II and Korean War veteran; later promoted up to lieutenant general.
- John Lucian Smith – Commander of VMF-223 during Battle of Guadalcanal, flying ace with 19 victories and Medal of Honor recipient

Famous Continental Army colonels

- Henry Knox – As colonel of the Continental Regiment of Artillery in 1776, he brought guns from Fort Ticonderoga to Dorchester Heights, forcing the British out of Boston the next morning. Later, President Washington made him Secretary of War as part of the first Presidential Cabinet in the U.S. He also served in Washington's crossing of the Delaware River for the Battle of Trenton.
- William Moultrie – Defended Fort Sullivan (later to be named Fort Moultrie in honor of the colonel) against British attack in 1776; his regiment was later absorbed by the Continental Army, and he was promoted to brigadier general.
- Henry Rutgers – philanthropist and namesake of Rutgers University.
