= List of American women's firsts =

This is a list of American women's firsts, noting the first time that an American woman or women achieved a given historical feat. Inclusion on the list is reserved for achievements by American women that have significant historical impact.

== 17th century ==
- 1635
  - Anne Hutchinson was the first American woman to start a Protestant sect.
- 1640
  - Anne Bradstreet was the first published poet in the British North American colonies.
- 1647
  - Margaret Brent was the first American woman to demand the right to vote.
- 1649
  - Sarah White Norman and Mary Vincent Hammon were charged with "lewd behavior upon a bed." They are the first American women convicted of lesbian activity.

== 18th century ==
- 1700s
  - Henrietta Johnston was the first known female portrait painter in the American colonies as well as the first woman pastelist.
- 1739
  - Elizabeth Timothy was the first woman to print a formal newspaper as well as the first female franchise holder in the colonies.
- 1750
  - Jane Colden was the first woman botanist in America.
- 1756
  - Lydia Taft was the first woman known to vote legally in Colonial America after her husband died and son left her; she was granted permission to vote through a Massachusetts town meeting.
- 1762
  - Ann Smith Franklin was the first female newspaper editor in America.
- 1776
  - Margaret Corbin was the first woman to assume the role of soldier in the American Revolutionary War and receive a pension for it.
- 1784
  - Hannah Adams was the first American woman to become a professional writer.
  - Hannah Slater was the first American woman granted a patent.

== 19th century ==
=== 1800s ===
- 1808
  - Jane Aitken was the first American woman to print the Bible in English.

=== 1810s ===
- 1812
  - Lucy Brewer was one of the first American women to join the United States Marine Corps.

=== 1820s ===
- 1828
  - Sarah Hale was the first American woman to become editor of a major women's magazine (Godey's Lady's Book).

=== 1830s ===
- 1835
  - Harriot Kezia Hunt was one of the first American women to practice medicine professionally, and "clearly the first to achieve a marked success".

=== 1840s ===
- 1840
  - Dorothy Catherine Draper was the first woman to be photographed.
- 1846
  - Sarah Bagley was the first woman in America to become a telegraph operator.
  - Frances Whitcher was the first significant female comic protagonist in America, and the "first best-selling woman humorist".
- 1848
  - Maria Mitchell was the first female astronomer in the United States as well as the first woman elected to the American Academy of Arts and Sciences.
- 1849
  - Elizabeth Blackwell, born in England, was the first woman to earn a medical degree in America.

=== 1850s ===
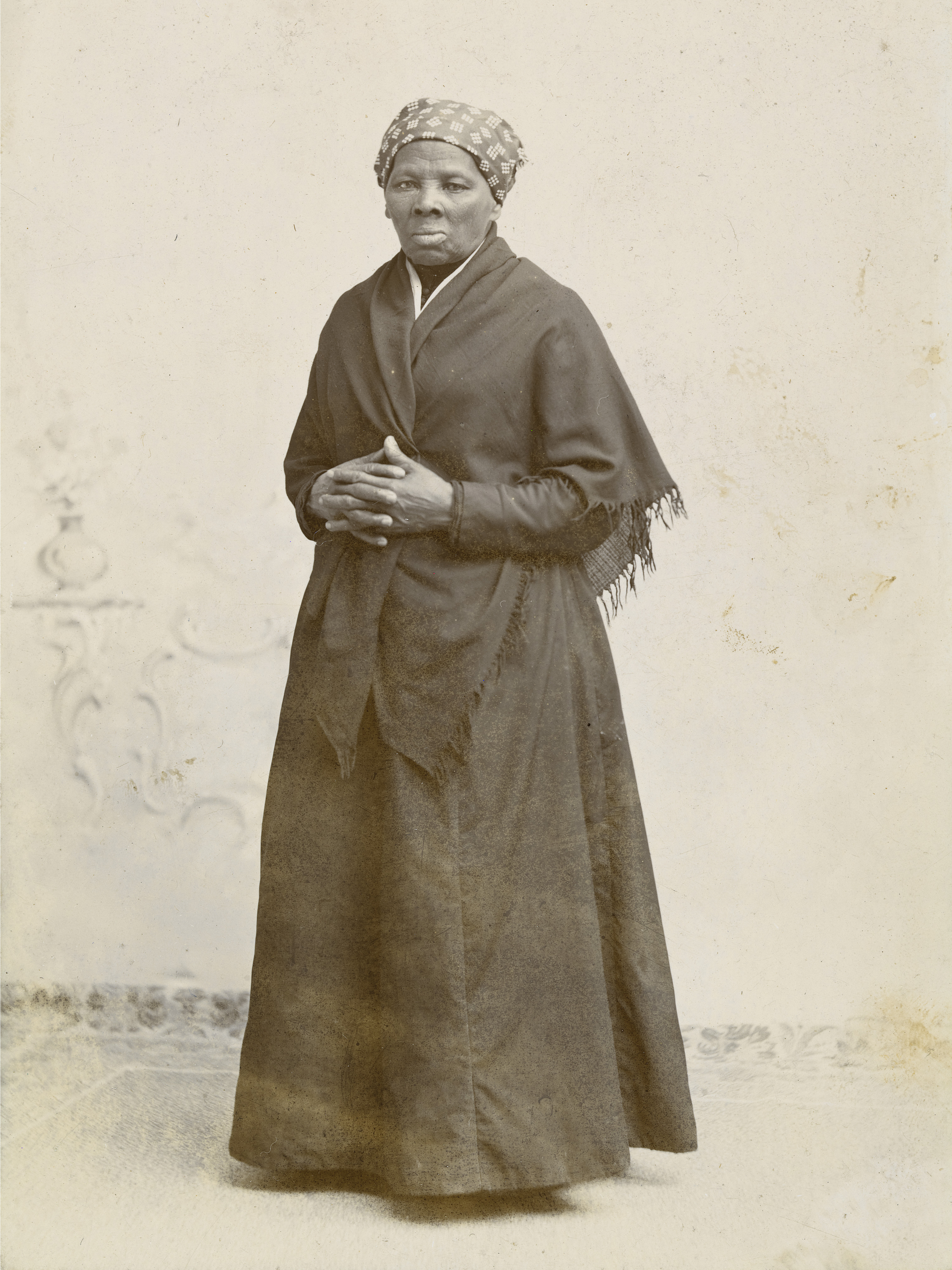
Harriet Tubman c1885

- 1850
  - Harriet Tubman was the first American woman to run an underground railroad to help slaves escape. Some scholars label her the "Queen of the Underground Railroad".
- 1853
  - Antoinette Brown Blackwell was the first woman ordained as a minister in America; she was ordained by the Congregational Church.
- 1854
  - Amelia Butler was the first known American woman to perform as a clown.
- 1855
  - Anne Elizabeth McDowell was the first American woman to publish a newspaper completely run by women; it was circulated weekly and titled, "Women's Advocate".
  - Emeline Roberts Jones was the first woman to practice dentistry in the United States. She married the dentist Daniel Jones when she was a teenager, and became his assistant in 1855.

=== 1860s ===
- 1865
  - Mary Surratt was the first woman executed by the federal government of the United States; she was hanged for conspiring with John Wilkes Booth in the assassination of Abraham Lincoln.
- 1866
  - Mary Walker was the first woman in America to receive the Congressional Medal of Honor.
  - Lucy Hobbs Taylor was the first woman in America to graduate from a dental school (Ohio College of Dental Surgery).
- 1869
  - Arabella Mansfield was the first American woman to become a professional lawyer; she was admitted to the Iowa bar.

=== 1870s ===
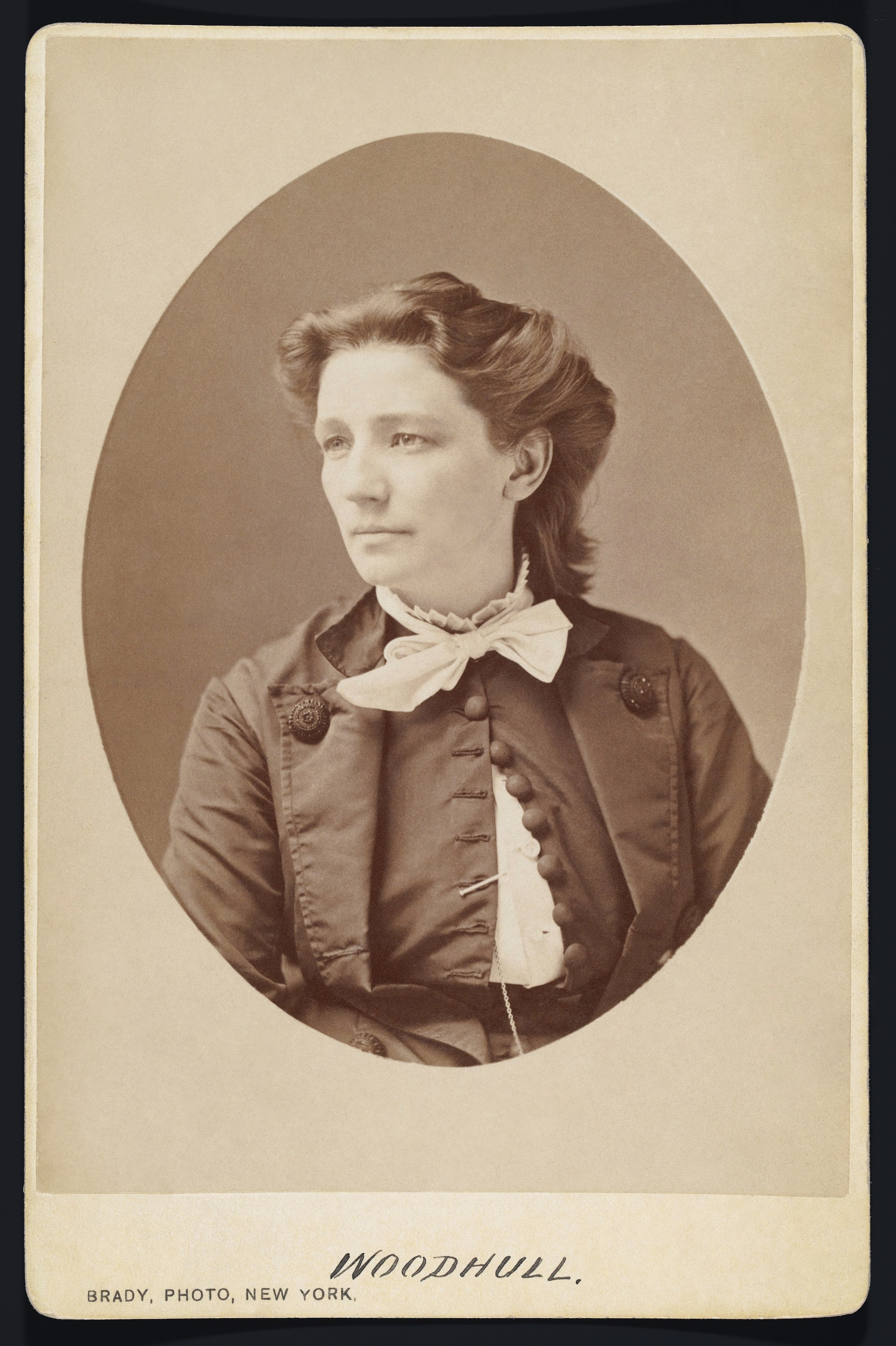
Victoria Woodhull c1870

- 1870
  - Louisa Swain was the first woman in the United States to vote in a general election, after the women of New Jersey lost the right to vote in 1807; she cast her ballot on September 6, 1870, in Laramie, Wyoming.
  - Esther Hobart Morris was the first woman in America to serve as Justice of the peace.
  - Ada Kepley was the first woman to graduate from law school in America (Northwestern University School of Law).
- 1871
  - Frances Willard was the first American woman college president. She also presided over the Women's Christian Temperance Union
- 1872
  - Victoria Woodhull was the first woman to run for President of the United States.
- 1873
  - Ellen Swallow Richards was one of first American women to become a professional chemist and first to earn a degree in Chemistry; she was the first woman to graduate from school of science or technology in America (Massachusetts Institute of Technology).
- 1876
  - Louise Blanchard Bethune was the first American woman to become a professional architect.
- 1877
  - Helen Magill White was the first woman in America to earn the Ph.D. degree (in Greek).
- 1878
  - Emma Abbott was the first American woman to form her own opera company.
- 1879
  - Sarah Loguen Fraser became the first African American woman to graduate from the Syracuse College of Medicine.

=== 1880s ===
- 1880
  - Belva Ann Lockwood was the first woman to argue a case before the Supreme Court of the United States.
  - Mary Myers, a balloonist, who was the first woman to fly solo – done 4 July 1880 at Little Falls, New York.
- 1881
  - Emma Amelia Hall became the first woman to head a state institution in Michigan when she was appointed as the first superintendent of Michigan's Girls Training School, Adrian, Michigan.
- 1887
  - Susanna M. Salter was elected mayor of Argonia, Kansas, becoming the first woman mayor in the United States.
  - Phoebe Couzins was the first American woman to serve as a United States Marshal.
- 1888
  - Verina Morton Jones became the first African-American woman and first woman to practice medicine in the state of Mississippi.

=== 1890s ===
- 1890
  - Amanda Theodosia Jones established the first all-women's company, called Women's Canning and Preserving Company
- 1891
  - Marie Owens, born in Canada, was hired as America's first female police officer, joining the Chicago Police Department.
  - Irene Williams Coit, was the first woman passing the Yale College entrance examination.
  - Halle Tanner Dillon Johnson became the first woman and first African-American woman to be licensed as a physician in the U.S. state of Alabama.
- 1892
  - Wilhelmina Weber Furlong was the first American woman Modernist studio painter from the early American Modernism scene in Manhattan, New York
- 1893
  - Florence Kelley was the first woman to hold statewide office when Governor John Peter Altgeld appointed her Chief Factory Inspector for the state of Illinois.
  - Sarah Garland Boyd Jones became the first African-American woman physician to pass the Virginia Medical Examining Board's examination; some sources describe her as the first woman of any race to do so, while Encyclopedia Virginia states a white woman had passed the examination in 1890.
- 1894
  - Julia A. J. Foote became the first woman and first African-American woman deacon in the African Methodist Episcopal Zion Church.
- 1896
  - May Irwin was the first actress in America to kiss on screen, which she did in the film The Kiss.
- 1898
  - Lutie Lytle became the first woman to teach law in a chartered law school when she joined the faculty of her alma mater, Central Tennessee College of Law.
- 1899
  - Eleonora de Cisneros was the first American trained opera singer the Metropolitan Opera company hired.

== 20th century ==
=== 1900s ===
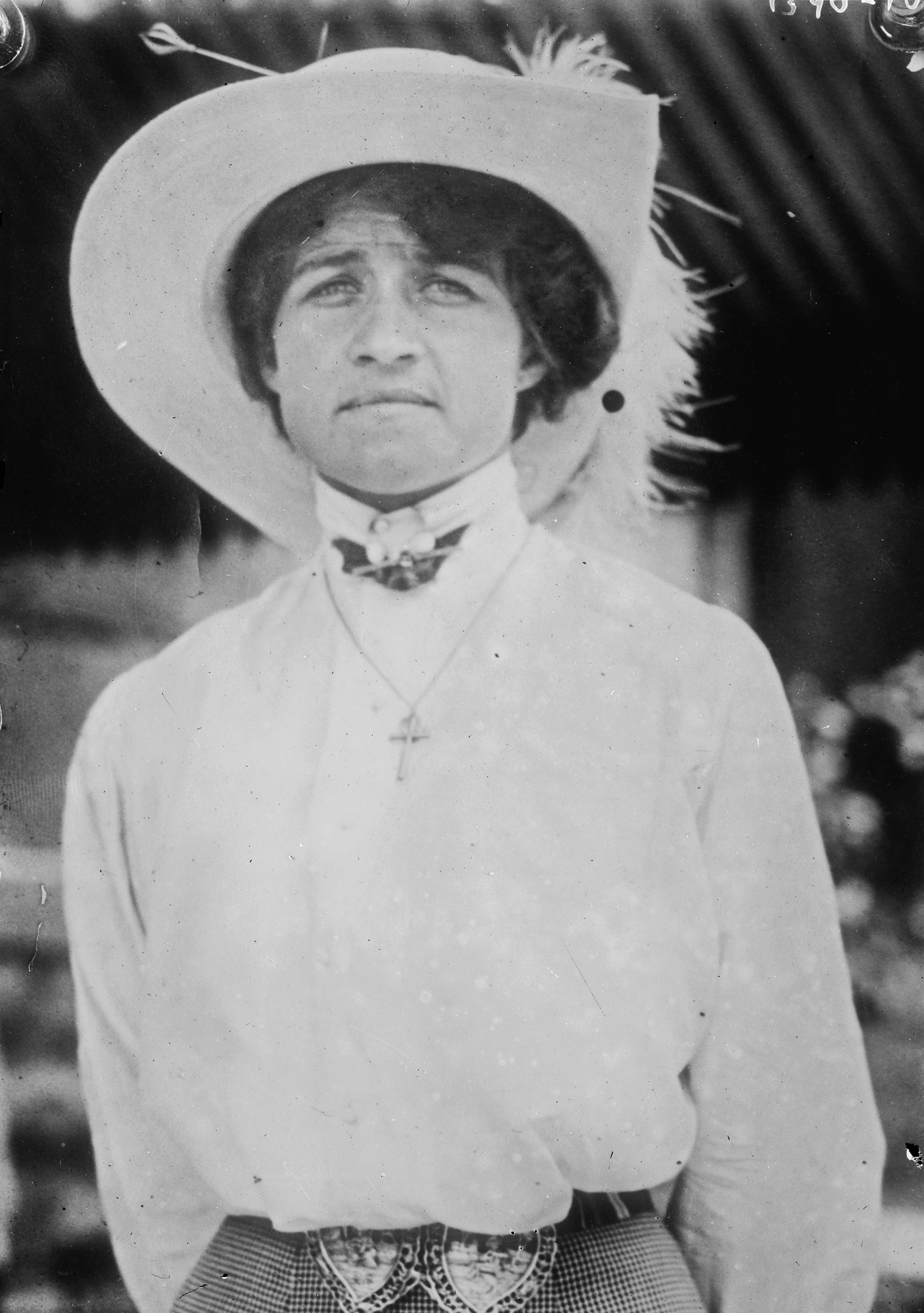
May Sutton

- 1900
  - Margaret Abbott was the first American woman to win an Olympic event (women's golf tournament at the 1900 Paris Games); she was the first American woman, and the second woman overall to do it.
  - Carro Morrell Clark was the first American woman to establish, own and manage a book publishing firm (The C. M. Clark Company opened in Boston).
- 1901
  - Gertrude Stanton, first woman licensed to practice optometry in the U.S.
- 1902
  - Etta Haynie Maddox became the first woman and first African-American woman licensed to practice law in the state of Maryland
- 1905
  - May Sutton was the first American woman to win Wimbledon.
- 1907
  - Dorothy Tyler was the first known American woman jockey.
- 1908
  - Lola Baldwin was the first known woman performing duties as police officer in the United States; she worked at Portland Police Bureau until 1922.
  - The first Mother's Day was observed; Anna Jarvis is noted as the driving force for recognition of this holiday.
  - The first U.S. Navy nurses, known as the Sacred Twenty, were appointed; they were all women, and were the first women to formally serve in the U.S. Navy.
  - Poet Julia Ward Howe was the first woman elected to the American Academy of Arts and Letters.
- 1909
  - Carolyn B. Shelton became the first woman to serve as acting governor of a U.S. state; she performed the duties as governor of Oregon just over the weekend in absence of both outgoing and incoming full-time governor.

=== 1910s ===
- 1910
  - Alice Stebbins Wells was the first American-born woman sworn in as a police officer, which she did at Los Angeles Police Department.
  - Florence Lawrence was America's first movie star.
- 1911
  - Harriet Quimby was the first woman licensed as an airplane pilot in America.
  - Clara Elizabeth Chan Lee was the first Chinese American woman to register to vote in the United States; she registered to vote on November 8, 1911, in California following the passage of 1911 California Proposition 4, nine years before the passage of the Nineteenth Amendment to the United States Constitution.
  - Sarah Willie Layton became the first woman and first African-American woman field secretary of the National Urban League.
- 1912
  - Girl Guides of America (now Girl Scouts of the USA) was established as the first voluntary organization for girls.
- 1914
  - Caresse Crosby was the first woman to patent a brassiere.
- 1915
  - Alice Ball was the first African American and first woman to graduate from the University of Hawaiʻi (master's degree in chemistry)
  - Hannah Pierce Lowe became the first woman and first African-American woman to earn a certificate by the American Teachers Association
- 1916
  - Margaret Sanger opened the first birth control clinic in the United States.
  - November 7 – Jeannette Rankin became the first woman elected to a national office; she represented Montana as the first woman in the U.S. House of Representatives or either chamber of U.S. Congress.
- 1917
  - Loretta Perfectus Walsh was the first woman to enlist in the U.S. Navy.
- 1918
  - Annette Abbott Adams was the first woman to serve as Assistant Attorney General, "...the highest judicial position any woman in the world had ever held".
  - Opha May Johnson was the first woman to enlist in the United States Marines.
  - Myrtle Hazard was the first uniformed woman to serve in the United States Coast Guard.
  - Sara Teasdale was the first woman to win the Pulitzer Prize for Poetry (for her collection Love Songs)

=== 1920s ===
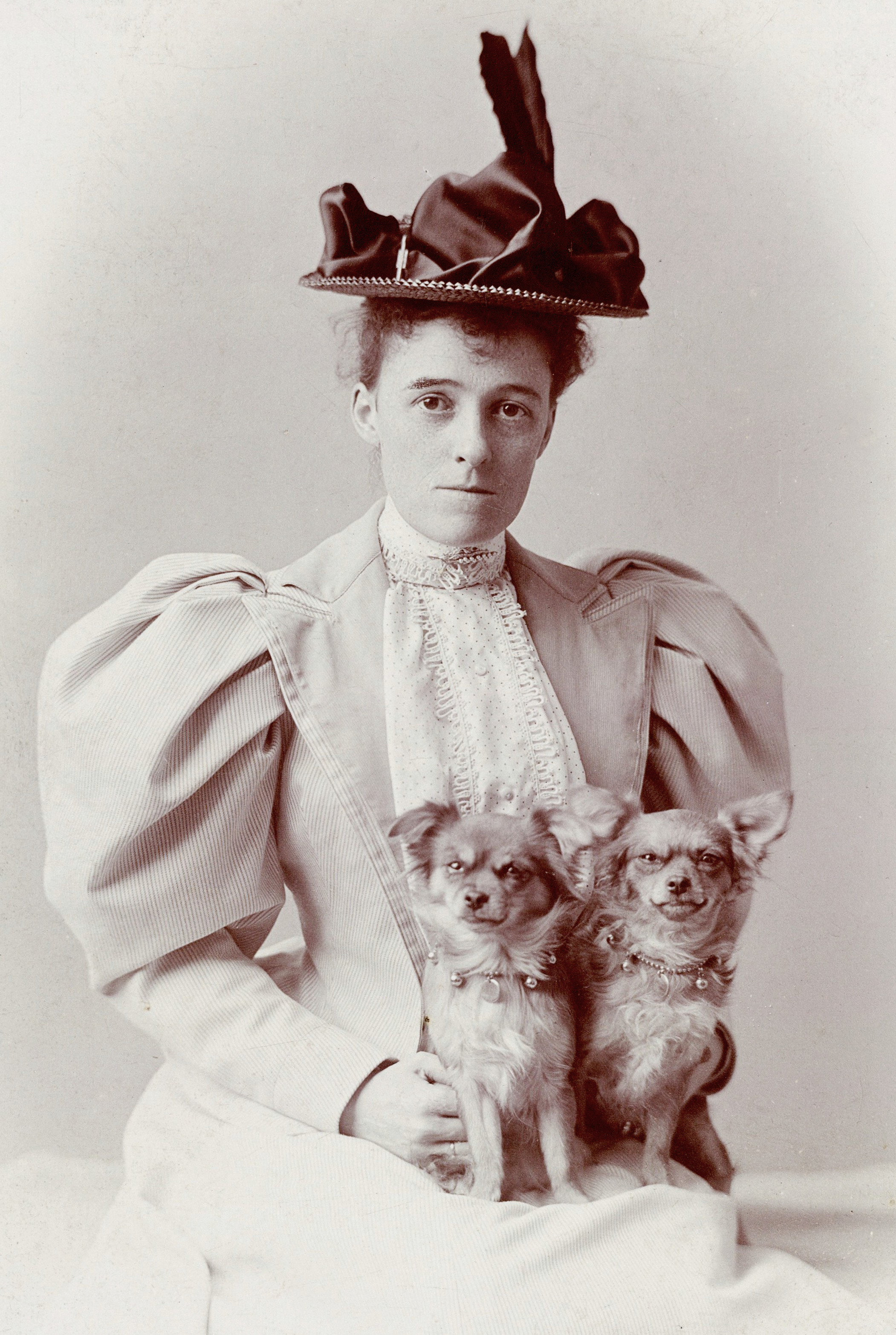
Edith Newbold Jones Wharton

- 1920
  - Marie Luhring was the first woman in America to become an automotive engineer.
- 1921
  - Edith Wharton was the first woman to win the Pulitzer Prize for Fiction (for her novel The Age of Innocence).
  - Margaret Gorman was the first winner of Miss America beauty pageant.
  - June 20 – Alice Mary Robertson became the first woman to preside over the U.S. House of Representatives or either chamber of U.S. Congress; however, she was opposed to women's suffrage.
  - Zona Gale was the first woman to win the Pulitzer Prize for Drama (for her play Miss Lulu Bett)
- 1922
  - November 21 – Rebecca Latimer Felton became the first woman to serve in the U.S. Senate; she appointed by the state governor to represent Georgia, although she served for only one day.
  - Mary Burnett Talbert became the first woman and first African-American woman to be awarded the highest honor by the NAACP, the Spingarn Medal.
- 1923
  - Florence King became the first woman to win a case before the U.S. Supreme Court (Crown v. Nye).
  - Ella Lillian Wall Van Leer became the first woman to serve in an office of the American Legion and would later successfully advocate for women to be admitted into Georgia Tech.
- 1924
  - Florence Bolan became the first unofficial U.S. Secret Service special agent.
  - Juliana R. Force was the first woman to present folk art in an official public showing exhibition in America.
  - Mamie George S. Williams became the first woman from Georgia and the first African-American woman in the nation to serve on the National Republican Committee; later in the same year, Williams became the first woman in U.S. history accorded the floor of the National Republican Convention.
  - Fannie Barrier Williams became the first African American and first woman to serve on the Chicago Library Board.
- 1925
  - Nellie Tayloe Ross became the first woman elected governor of a U.S. state; she nominated for the unexpired term as governor of Wyoming upon the death of her husband.
  - An All-Woman Supreme Court in Texas, the first woman-majority state Supreme Court in U.S. history, sits for a five-month special sitting on a single case, disbanding shortly afterward.
- 1926
  - Gertrude Ederle was the first woman to swim across the English Channel.
- 1927
  - Edith S. Sampson became the first woman and first African-American woman to earn the Master of Laws degree from Loyola University Chicago Illinois.
- 1928
  - Amelia Earhart was the first woman to fly across the Atlantic ocean.
  - Genevieve R. Cline was the first woman appointed as a United States federal judge.

=== 1930s ===
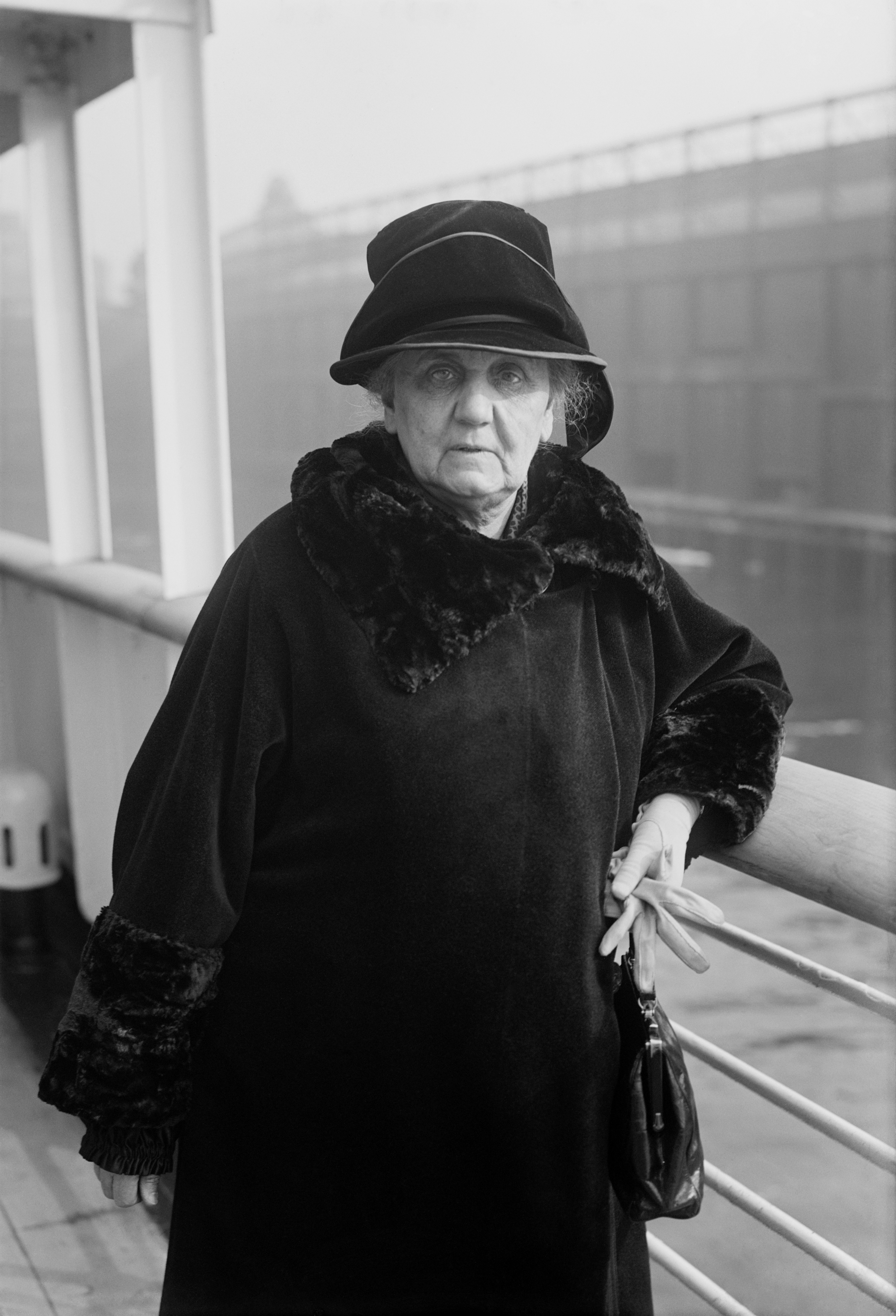
Jane Addams

- 1930
  - Ellen Church was the first female flight attendant in America; she suggested the idea of female nurses on board to Boeing Air Transport, claiming that if people felt safer they would fly more.
  - Mary Elizabeth Branch became the first woman and the first African-American woman to head an accredited college in Texas (Tillotson College (now Huston–Tillotson University), a HBCU in Austin, Texas.
- 1931
  - Jane Addams was the first American woman to win the Nobel Peace Prize; she shared the prize with Nicholas Murray Butler.
- 1932
  - Hattie Caraway was the first woman elected to the U.S. Senate.
- 1933
  - Ruth Bryan Owen became the first woman ever to serve as a chief of mission at the minister rank, and as such the first woman to serve as minister to Denmark and Iceland; she served under President Franklin D. Roosevelt.
  - Frances Perkins became the first woman ever to serve in a presidential cabinet, and as such the first woman to serve as Secretary of Labor; she served under President Franklin D. Roosevelt.
- 1934
  - Gertrude Atherton was the first woman to be president of the (American) National Academy of Literature.
  - Lettie Pate Whitehead was the first woman to serve as a director of a major corporation (The Coca-Cola Company).
- 1935
  - Kate Galt Zaneis was the first woman to lead a state college or university in the United States when she became president of Southeastern Oklahoma State Teachers College.
- 1937
  - Grace Hudowalski was the ninth person and first woman to climb all 46 of the Adirondack High Peaks.
  - Helen Elsie Austin became the first African American and first woman appointed as an assistant attorney general in Ohio.
- 1938
  - Pearl S. Buck was the first American woman to win the Nobel Prize in Literature.
- 1939
  - Molly Kool was North America's first registered female sea captain or ship master.

=== 1940s ===
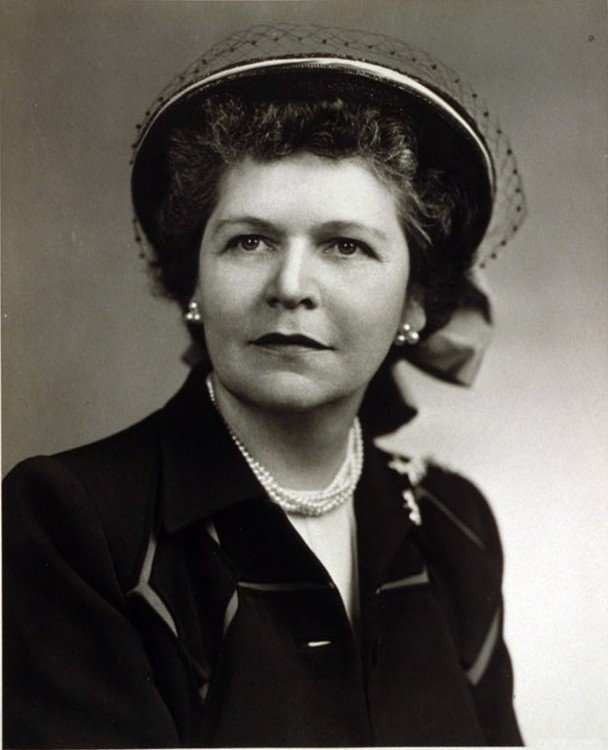
Georgia Neese Clark Gray

- 1940
  - Lois Fegan Farrell was the first female reporter to cover a professional hockey team in America.
- 1941
  - Marie Taylor became the first woman and the first African-American woman to earn a Ph.D. in science from Fordham University (botany).
- 1942
  - Annie Fox was the first woman to receive the Purple Heart, which she received for being wounded in the attack on Pearl Harbor.
  - Mildred H. McAfee was the first woman commissioned in the U.S. Naval Reserve and the first woman to receive the Navy Distinguished Service Medal
- 1943
  - Nellie Neilson was the first woman to serve as president of the American Historical Association.
  - Edith Ellen Greenwood was the first woman to receive the Soldier's Medal.
- 1944
  - Cordelia E Cook was the first woman to receive both the Bronze Star Medal and the Purple Heart.
  - Ann Baumgartner was the first woman to fly a jet aircraft, the Bell YP-59A on October 14, 1944.
- 1946
  - Frances Xavier Cabrini was the first American canonized by the Roman Catholic church as a saint.
  - Lucie Campbell became the first woman and first African American to serve on the federal grand jury in Memphis, Tennessee.
- 1947
  - Gerty Cori was the first woman to win the Nobel Prize in Physiology or Medicine; she shared the prize with Carl Ferdinand Cori and Bernardo Alberto Houssay. Although born in Prague, Gerty Cori is considered the first American woman to win a Nobel Prize in medicine. She had become a U.S. citizen in 1928.
- 1948
  - Esther McGowin Blake was the first woman in the U.S. Air Force. She enlisted in the first minute of the first hour of the first day regular Air Force duty was authorized for women on July 8, 1948.
  - Phyllis Ann Wallace became the first woman and first African-American woman to earn a Ph.D. in economics from Yale University.
- 1949
  - Georgia Neese Clark Gray was the first woman Treasurer of the United States; she served under President Harry Truman.
  - Eugenie Anderson became the first woman ever to serve as a chief of mission at the ambassador rank, and as such the first woman to serve as United States Ambassador to Denmark; she served under President Harry S. Truman.
  - Shirley Dinsdale was the first recipient of the Emmy Award.
  - Sara Christian was the first woman to compete in a major-league stock car race, competing in NASCAR's inaugural Strictly Stock (now NASCAR Cup Series) event.

=== 1950s ===
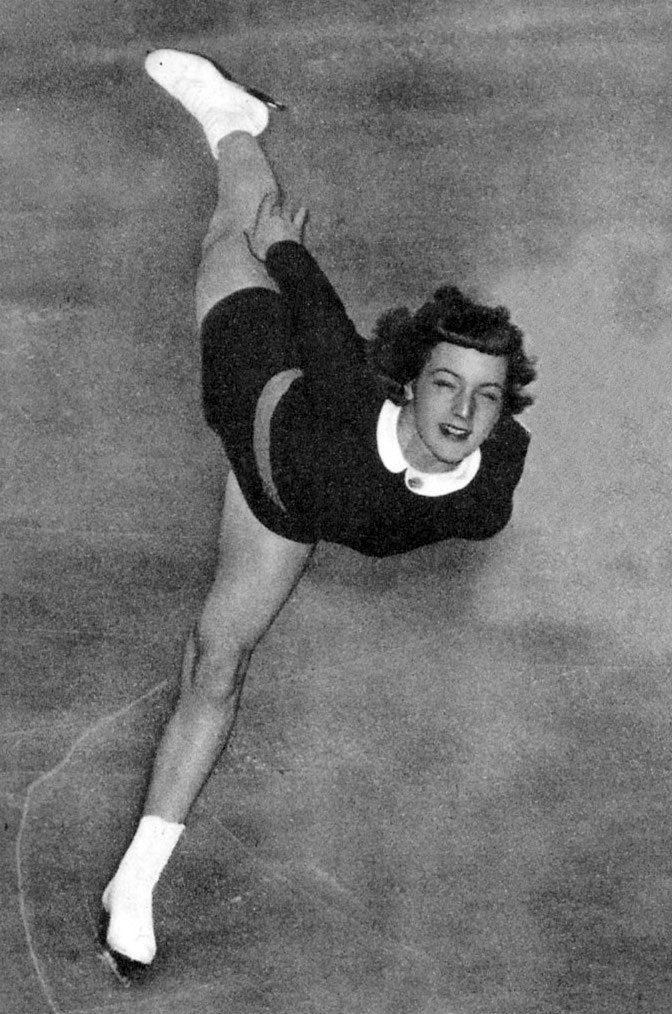
Tenley Albright in Tokyo 1953

- 1950
  - On May 12, Emma Bailey held an auction in Brattleboro, Vermont, becoming the first American woman auctioneer.
- 1951
  - Maryly Van Leer Peck became Vanderbilt University's first chemical engineer graduate. Peck also became the first woman to receive an M.S. and a Ph.D. in chemical engineering from the University of Florida. Later she became the first female member of Tau Beta Pi, the oldest engineering honor society. Peck later became the first woman to be named president of any of Florida's community colleges.
  - Paula Ackerman was the first woman in America to perform rabbinical functions.
  - Arie Taylor became the first Black person to become a U.S. Women's Air Force classroom instructor.
  - Helen E. Myers of Lancaster, Pa., a 1941 graduate of Temple University, was commissioned as the U.S. Army Dental Corps' first woman dental officer.
  - Lillian Baumbach Jacobs became the first female master plumber in the United States.
  - December 16: Anna Der-Vartanian became the U.S. Navy's first female master chief petty officer; this made her the first female master chief in the Navy, as well as the first female E-9 in the entire U.S. Armed Services. She received a personal letter from then-President Dwight D. Eisenhower congratulating her on her accomplishment.
  - Yvonne Clark became the first woman and first African-American woman at Howard University to complete a bachelor's degree in mechanical engineering.
- 1953
  - Fae Adams was the first female to receive regular commission as a doctor in the United States Army.
  - Oveta Culp Hobby became the first woman to serve as Secretary of Health, Education, and Welfare; she served under President Dwight D. Eisenhower.
  - Toni Stone, also known by her married name Marcenia Lyle Alberga, was the first of three women to play Negro league baseball, and thus the first woman to play as a regular on an American big-league professional baseball team.
  - Ruby Bradley, upon leaving Korea, was given a full-dress honor guard ceremony, the first woman ever to receive a national or international guard salute.
- 1954
  - Jewel Prestage, first African-American woman to complete a doctorate in political science in the United States.
- 1955
  - Betty Robbins, born in Greece, was the first female cantor (hazzan) in the 5,000-year-old history of Judaism. She was appointed cantor of the reform Temple Avodah in Oceanside, New York, in 1955, when she was 31 and the Temple was without a cantor for the High Holidays.
  - Clotilde Dent Bowen became the U.S. Army's first Black female physician to attain the rank of colonel.
  - Willa Beatrice Player became the first woman and first African-American woman president of Bennett College
- 1956
  - Tenley Albright was the first woman in America to win the Olympic gold medal in figure skating.
  - Vel Phillips became the first woman and the first African-American member of the Common Council in Milwaukee, Wisconsin, and given the title "Madam Alderman" by local officials.
- 1957
  - Decoy: Police Woman was the first television show to feature a female police officer, and in fact the first built around a female protagonist.
  - Althea Gibson became the first woman and first African-American woman on the cover of Sports Illustrated magazine.
- 1959
  - Arlene Pieper became the first woman to officially finish a marathon in the United States when she finished the Pikes Peak Marathon in Manitou Springs, Colorado, in 1959.

=== 1960s ===
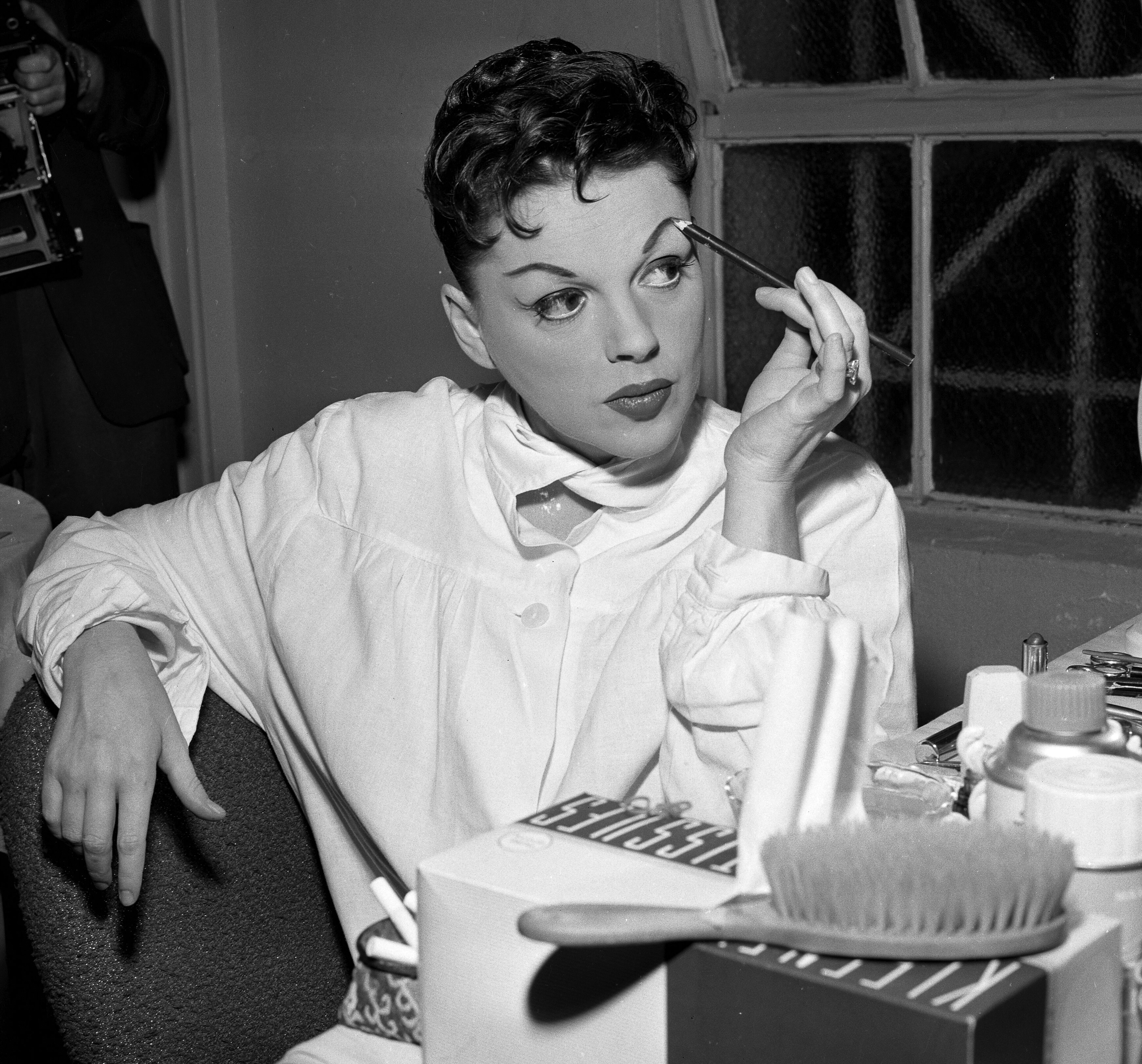
Judy Garland at Greek Theater

- 1960
  - Master Gunnery Sergeant Geraldine M. Moran became the first female Marine promoted to E-9.
- 1961
  - The first female U.S. Marine to be promoted to Sergeant Major (Bertha Peters Billeb).
  - Jacqueline Bouvier Kennedy began her role as the first Catholic First Lady of the United States.
  - Ruth Kerr Jakoby was the first woman Diplomate of the American Board of Neurological Surgery.
  - Annette Lewis Phinazee became the first woman and first African-American woman to earn a doctorate in library science from Columbia University.
- 1962
  - Pearl Faurie became the first SPAR in the U.S. Coast Guard advanced to E-9.
  - Judy Garland became the first woman to win Album of the Year at the Grammy Awards, winning for Judy at Carnegie Hall. She was also the first woman to win the Golden Globe Cecil B. DeMille Award.
  - Mildred Mitchell-Bateman became the first woman and first African American to hold the position of West Virginia's mental health commissioner.
- 1963
  - Maria Goeppert Mayer was the first American woman to win a Nobel Prize in Physics; she shared the prize with Eugene Paul Wigner and J. Hans D. Jensen. She was born in Poland, but became a U.S. citizen in 1933.
  - Sarah T. Hughes was the first and only woman to swear in the President of the United States.

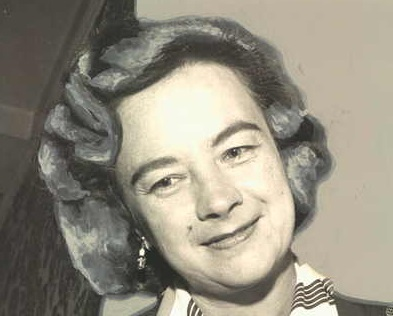
Jerrie Mock, flying solo in 1964, became the first woman to fly around the world

- 1964
  - Jerrie Mock was the first woman to fly solo around the world, which she did in a Cessna 180 named the Spirit of Columbus. The trip, which began on March 19, 1964, at the Port Columbus International Airport in Columbus, Ohio, and ended there on April 17, 1964, took 29 1/2 days, 21 stopovers and almost 22,860 miles.
  - Carol Doda was the first woman in America to perform as a topless entertainer.
  - Isabel Benham was the first female partner in R.W. Pressprich & Co.'s 55-year history, which also made her the first female partner at any Wall Street bond house.
  - Alice K. Kurashige became the first Japanese-American woman commissioned in the United States Marine Corps.
  - Frankie Muse Freeman became the first woman and first African-American woman appointed to the U.S. Commission on Civil Rights.
  - Jeanne Sinkford became the first woman and first African-American woman prosthodontist with a PhD degree (Physiology, Northwestern University).
- 1965
  - Rachel Henderlite was the first woman ordained in the Presbyterian Church in the United States; she was ordained by the Hanover Presbytery in Virginia.
  - Constance Baker Motley became the first African-American woman and first woman Borough president of Manhattan.
  - Alberta Odell Jones became the first woman of any race and first African-American woman appointed prosecutor in the state of Kentucky (Louisville Domestic Relations Court).
  - Carole Simpson became the first woman and first African-American woman to broadcast radio news in Chicago.
- 1966
  - Roberta Louise "Bobbi" Gibb was the first woman to run the entire Boston Marathon.
  - Wilma L. Vaught became the first woman to deploy with a Strategic Air Command operational unit.
  - Euphemia Haynes became the first woman and first African-American woman to chair the District of Columbia Board of Education.
- 1967
  - Victorine du Pont Homsey was the first woman elected as a Fellow of the American Institute of Architects.
  - Kathrine Switzer was the first woman to run the Boston Marathon as a numbered entry.
  - Muriel Siebert was the first female member of the New York Stock Exchange.
  - Tina Turner was the first woman and first African-American woman to appear on the cover of Rolling Stone magazine.
  - Clara Adams-Ender became the first woman and first African-American woman to be awarded the United States Army's Expert Field Medical Badge.
  - Georgia Davis Powers became the first African American and first woman elected to the Kentucky Senate.
- 1968
  - Barbara M. Watson became the first woman and first African-American woman to serve as United States Assistant Secretary of State (Assistant Secretary of State for Consular Affairs).
  - Coretta Scott King became the first woman and first African-American woman to deliver the Class Day address at Harvard University.
  - Arenia Mallory became the first woman and first person of color to be elected to the Holmes County Board of Education Mississippi.
  - C. Delores Tucker became the first African American and first woman member of the Philadelphia, Pennsylvania Planning Board.
  - Jeanne Sinkford became the first woman and first African-American woman associate dean of a dental school in the United States (Howard University).
- 1969
  - Carol Doda was the first woman in America to perform as a bottomless entertainer.
  - Mae C. King became the first African-American woman and first woman Senior Staff Associate of the American Political Science Association.
  - Coretta Scott King became the first woman and first African-American woman to preach at a regular service at St. Paul's cathedral in London.

=== 1970s ===
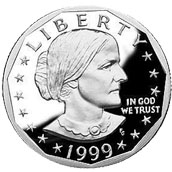
Susan B. Anthony dollar coin

- 1970
  - Diane Crump was the first woman in America to ride in the Kentucky Derby, she placed fifteenth.
  - Patricia Palinkas was the first woman to play professionally in an American football game.
  - Joyce Nichols was the first woman and first African-American woman to become a physician's assistant (PA).
  - Clara Stanton Jones became the first African American and first woman to serve as director of the Detroit Public Library.
  - Della Reese became the first African-American woman to guest host The Tonight Show (aired on 29 May 1970).
- 1971
  - Vel Phillips became the first woman judge in Milwaukee County and the first African-American judge in Wisconsin.
  - Raye Montague became the first woman and first African-American woman program manager of ships in the United States Navy.
  - Marcelite J. Harris became the first African-American woman and first woman in the U.S. Air Force to be an aircraft maintenance officer.
  - Jane C. Wright became the first woman and first African-American woman elected president of the New York Cancer Society.
- 1972
  - Alene Duerk becomes the first woman to obtain the rank of rear admiral in the U.S. Navy.
  - Anna Mae Hays and Elizabeth P. Hoisington were the first women in the United States promoted to brigadier general.
  - Sally Priesand was ordained on June 3, 1972, by the Hebrew Union College-Jewish Institute of Religion's president Rabbi Alfred Gottschalk at Plum Street Temple in Cincinnati, making her the first woman ordained as a rabbi in the United States, and only the second woman ever formally ordained in the history of Judaism.
  - Katharine Graham was the first female Fortune 500 CEO, as CEO of the Washington Post company.
  - Tonie Nathan was the first woman in America to receive an electoral vote for vice president in a presidential election.
- 1973
  - Shirley Muldowney was the first woman to receive a NHRA license to drive Top Fuel dragsters, the highest level of the drag racing sport.
  - Rosalie A. Reed became the first woman and first African-American woman to work as a veterinarian at a major American zoo (Los Angeles Zoo)
- 1974
  - Jeannette Piccard was the first female balloon pilot licensed in the United States; she was also the first woman to ascend to the stratosphere.
  - Ella T. Grasso was the first woman elected a U.S. governor who was not the wife or widow of a governor. She was elected governor of Connecticut.
  - Joan Bernard Armstrong became the first African-American woman and first woman elected judge in Louisiana.
  - Sara J. Harper became the first African-American woman and first woman military judge in the history of the Marine Corps Reserve.
  - Lorraine A. Williams became the first woman and first African-American woman editor of the Journal of Negro History. Also, first woman and first African-American woman to serve as vice president of academic affairs at Howard University
- 1975
  - Barbara Ostfeld-Horowitz was the first female cantor ordained in Reform Judaism, in 1975.
  - Carla Anderson Hills became the first woman to serve as Secretary of Housing and Urban Development; she served under President Gerald Ford.
  - Alice Rivlin became founder and the first woman to serve as Director of the Congressional Budget Office (CBO).
  - Phyllis Ann Wallace became the first woman and first African-American woman professor at the MIT Sloan School of Management.
  - Geraldine Pittman Woods became the first woman and first African-American woman elected chair of the Howard University board of trustees.
- 1976
  - Shirley Black, aka Shirley Temple, was the first woman to be chief of protocol, which she was for President Gerald Ford.
  - Lucy Giovinco was the first female in America to win the AMF Bowling World Cup.
  - Women first began to attend the U.S. service academies.
  - Shirley Muldowney was the first woman to win a NHRA national event.
  - Emily Howell Warner was the first woman to become an American airline captain.
  - Clara Adams-Ender was the first woman and first African-American woman to graduate from the United States Army Command and General Staff College with a degree in military arts and sciences.
  - Alexa Canady became the first African American and first woman resident in neurosurgery at the University of Minnesota.
  - Yvonne Brathwaite Burke became the first woman and first African-American woman to chair the Congressional Black Caucus.
- 1977
  - Janet Guthrie was the first woman to compete in the Daytona 500 and the first woman to lead a NASCAR Winston Cup Series race.
  - Janet Guthrie was the first woman to compete in the Indianapolis 500, event.
  - Shirley Muldowney was the first woman to win a NHRA championship, in the Top Fuel category.
  - Barbara McClintock was the first woman to win an unshared Nobel Prize in Physiology or Medicine, and since she was American, she was the first American woman to do so.
  - Juanita M. Kreps became the first woman to serve as Secretary of Commerce; she served under President Jimmy Carter.
  - Carolyn R. Payton became the first woman and first African American appointed director of the Peace Corps.
  - Cecelia Adkins became the first woman and first African-American woman to serve on the Board of Directors of the Nashville Branch of the Federal Reserve Bank of Atlanta, and she served two terms as its chair.
  - Eddie Bernice Johnson became the first woman and first African-American woman to chair a major Texas house committee (Labor Committee).
  - Lucille Mason Rose became the first woman and first African-American woman to serve as a New York City Deputy Mayor.
- 1978
  - January 25 – Muriel Humphrey Brown was the first and only former Second Lady of the United States to serve in the U.S. Congress; she appointed by the state governor to represent Minnesota in the U.S. Senate to succeed her late husband, making her the first woman to hold that office.
  - Marcia Frederick, at the age of fifteen, was the first woman in America to win World gold in gymnastics.
  - Mary E. Clarke was the first woman to achieve the rank of major general in the United States Army.
  - Nancy Teeters became the first woman to serve on the Federal Reserve Board of Governors.
  - Ethelene Crockett became the first woman and first African-American woman to serve as president of the American Lung Association
  - Cardiss Collins became the first African American and first woman to be named Democratic whip-at-large in the United States House of Representatives.
  - Joycelyn Elders became the first person and first African American in the state of Arkansas to become board certified in pediatric endocrinology.
- 1979
  - Susan B. Anthony was the first woman in America depicted on a coin (the Susan B. Anthony dollar).
  - August 3 – Patricia Roberts Harris became the first woman and first person of color to serve multiple posts in a presidential cabinet; she appointed Secretary of Housing and Urban Development and Secretary of Health and Human Services serving under President Jimmy Carter.
  - November 30 – Shirley Hufstedler became the first woman to serve as Secretary of Education; she served under President Jimmy Carter.
  - Amalya Kearse became the first woman and first African-American woman judge for the United States Court of Appeals for the Second Circuit and first woman and first African-American woman elected to a fellowship in the American College of Trial Lawyers.
  - Judith W. Rogers became the first woman and first African-American woman Corporation Counsel for the District of Columbia.

=== 1980s ===
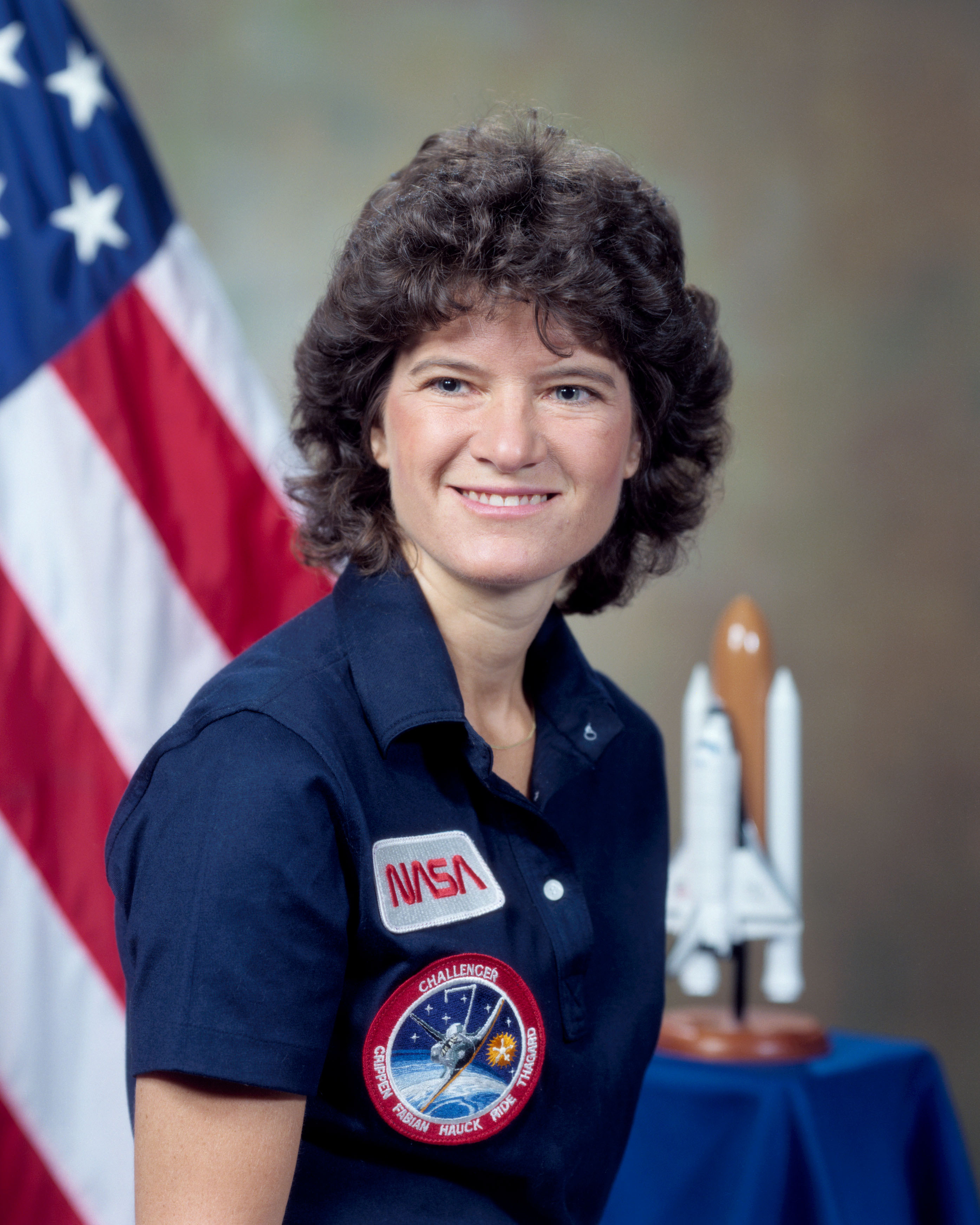
Sally Ride was the first American woman to become an astronaut.

- 1980
  - Norma Merrick Sklarek became the first woman and African-American woman elected to the Fellow of the American Institute of Architects (FAIA).
- 1981
  - Sandra Day O'Connor became the first woman to serve as Associate Justice of the Supreme Court of the United States, and as such the first woman ever to sit on the U.S. Supreme Court.
  - Arnette Hubbard became the first woman and first African-American woman president of the National Bar Association.
- 1982
  - Karen N. Horn became the first woman ever to serve as president of any of the 12 Federal Reserve Banks, and as such the first woman to serve as president of the Federal Reserve Bank of Cleveland.
  - Leah Lowenstein was the first woman dean of a co-educational medical school in the United States.
  - M. Deborrah Hyde became the first woman and African-American woman to complete a neurosurgery residency at Case Western University
  - Helen L. Miller became the first female African-American mayor in the state of Florida and first female mayor of Opa-locka, Florida.
- 1983
  - Elizabeth Dole became the first woman to serve as Secretary of Transportation; she served under President Ronald Reagan.
  - Sally Ride was the first American woman in space.
  - Vanessa L. Williams was the first African-American winner of the Miss America pageant (Miss America 1984).
  - Linda Foust was the first woman to drive in the U.S. Presidential motorcade as an Army non-commissioned officer.
  - Patricia Bath became the first woman and first African-American woman to chair an ophthalmology residency program in the United States (David Geffen School of Medicine at UCLA).
  - Patricia Walker-Shaw became the first woman and first African-American woman to head a major life insurance organization in the United States; and the first woman and first African-American woman president of the National Insurance Association.
- 1984
  - Velma Barfield became the first woman in the United States to be executed after the 1976 resumption of capital punishment and the first since 1962. and the first woman executed by lethal injection.
  - Geraldine Ferraro was the first woman in America to run for vice president on a major-party platform.
  - Joan Benoit won the first women's Olympic marathon.
  - Kathryn D. Sullivan was the first American woman to conduct a spacewalk.
  - Jacqueline B. Vaughn became the first woman and first African-American president of the Chicago Teachers Union.
  - Yvonne Walker-Taylor became the first woman and first African-American woman president of Wilberforce University, Wilberforce, Ohio.
- 1985
  - Penny Harrington was appointed as Chief of Police in Portland, Oregon, making her the first woman to lead a major-city police department.
  - Libby Riddles was the first woman to win the Iditarod.
  - Sharon Pratt Dixon became the first woman and first African-American woman to serve as the Democratic National Committee Treasurer.
  - Lynette Woodard became the first woman and first African-American woman to become a member of the Harlem Globetrotters.
- 1986
  - Ann Bancroft was the first woman to reach the North Pole by foot and dogsled, "...she became the first known woman to cross the ice to the North Pole."
  - Nancy Lieberman joined the United States Basketball League (USBL), thus becoming the first woman to play in a men's professional basketball league.
  - Willie Mae Leake became the first woman and first African American mayor of Chester, Pennsylvania
  - Lois DeBerry became the first woman and first African-American woman elected Speaker Pro Tempore of the Tennessee House of Representatives.
  - Kay George Roberts became the first woman and second African American to receive a Doctor of Musical Arts (DMA) from Yale University
  - Jessie M. Rattley became the first African-American mayor and first female mayor of Newport News, Virginia.
- 1987
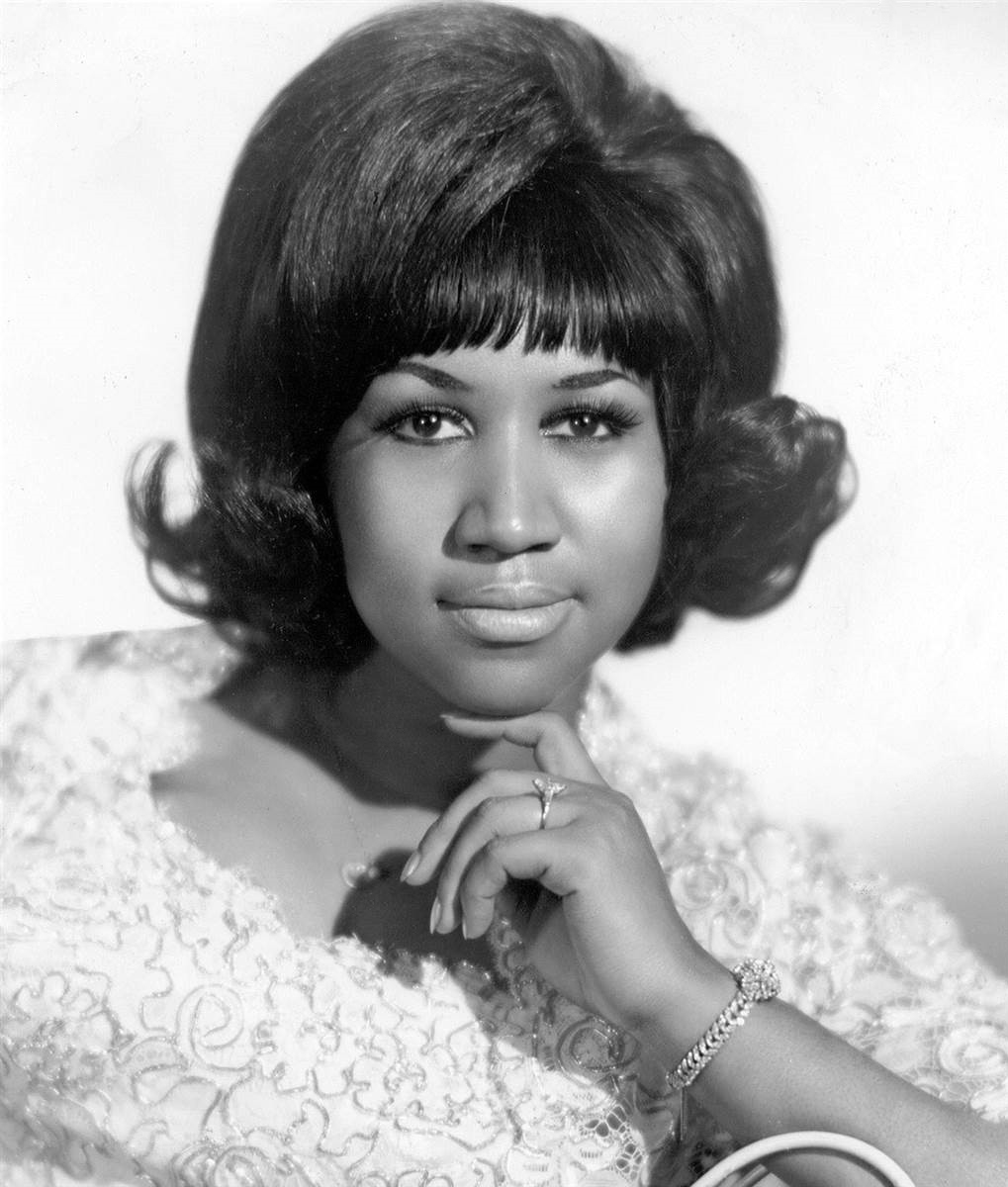
  - Aretha Franklin
    Aretha Franklin was the first woman and first African-American woman inducted into the Rock and Roll Hall of Fame.
  - Whitney Houston was the first woman and the first African-American woman to have an album debut at number one on the Billboard 200.
  - Niara Sudarkasa became the first woman and first African-American woman appointed president of Lincoln University.
  - Joycelyn Elders became the first woman and first African-American woman director of the Arkansas Department of Health.
  - Deborah Prothrow-Stith became the first woman, youngest person, and first African-American woman to serve as the commissioner of public health in the state of Massachusetts
  - Lottie Shackelford became the first African-American female and first female mayor of Little Rock, Arkansas.
  - Niara Sudarkasa became the first woman and first African-American woman president of Lincoln University (Pennsylvania).
- 1988
  - Dr. Lenora Fulani was the first female (and first African-American) presidential candidate to secure ballot access in all 50 states; she also secured the most votes ever gained by a female candidate in a presidential election until 2012.
  - Shawna Robinson was the first woman to win a NASCAR-sanctioned stock car race, winning in the Charlotte/Daytona Dash Series at New Asheville Speedway.
  - Tina Turner was the first woman and first African-American woman to set a Guinness World Record for the then-largest paying audience for a concert (180,000 fans).
  - Barbara Harris became the first African-American woman and first woman consecrated to the episcopate in any one of the three branches of Christianity.
  - Phyllis Ann Wallace became the first African American and first woman president of the Industrial Relations Research Association.
- 1989
  - Barbara Clementine Harris became the first African-American woman and first woman ordained bishop in the Episcopal Church.
  - Evelyn J. Fields was the first woman officer to command a National Oceanic and Atmospheric Administration (NOAA) ship and the first African-American woman to command a ship for an extended period within the nation's uniformed services.

=== 1990s ===
- 1990
  - Jennifer York was the first woman to form a Christian rock band and the first such band that was all-female, Rachel Rachel.
  - Marguerite Ross Barnett became the first African American and first woman chief administrator of the flagship of the four campus Houston system when appointed president of the University of Houston.
  - Sharon Pratt became the first African-American woman and first woman mayor of the District of Columbia.
  - Esther Rolle became the first woman and first African-American woman to earn the National Association for the Advancement of Colored People (NAACP) Chairman's Civil Rights Leadership Award.
- 1991
  - Geraldine Morrow was the first female president of the American Dental Association.
  - Minnesota's Supreme Court became the first woman-majority state supreme court that was appointed and sat for a regular session.
  - Irene Long became the first woman and first minority to hold the position of chief medical officer at NASA’s Kennedy Space Center in Florida.
  - Ruth Wright Hayre became the first woman and first African-American woman president of the Philadelphia Board of Education
  - Mary L. Smith became the first woman and first African-American woman president of Kentucky State University (KSU).
  - Sharon Pratt Kelly became the first woman and first African-American woman mayor of Washington, D.C.
- 1992
  - Manon Rhéaume was the first woman to play in a National Hockey League game; although she was Canadian, "She played goalie for the Tampa Bay Lightning..."
  - Mona Van Duyn was the first woman named US poet laureate.
  - Gwendolyn Calvert Baker became the first African American and first woman selected for the board of the Greater New York Savings Bank.
  - Leah Ward Sears became the first woman, first African-American woman, and the youngest person to serve on the Georgia Supreme Court.
  - Diana Bajoie became the first woman and first African-American woman elected to a Louisiana senate leadership post as Senate Pro Tempore.
  - Pamela Carter became the first woman and first African-American woman elected as Indiana Attorney General
  - Roberta Palm Bradley became the first woman and first African-American to head a major municipal public utility (Seattle City Light).
- 1993
  - Hazel R. O'Leary became the first woman and first African-American woman to serve as Secretary of Energy; she served under President Bill Clinton.
  - Halli Reid was the first woman to swim across Lake Erie, swimming from Long Point, Ontario, to North East, Pennsylvania, in 17 hours.
  - Janet Reno became the first woman to serve as Attorney General; she served under President Bill Clinton.
  - Sheila Widnall became the first woman ever to serve as leader of a branch of the United States Armed Forces, and as such the first woman to serve as Secretary of the Air Force; she served under President Bill Clinton.
  - Vicki Miles-LaGrange was the first African-American woman and first woman U.S. attorney in Oklahoma.
  - Condoleezza Rice was the first woman, first African American, and youngest provost in Stanford University's history.
  - Carol Moseley Braun became the first woman and first African-American woman U.S. Senator from Illinois, and in addition, became the first African-American woman to serve in the U.S. Senate.
  - Sharon Sayles Belton became the first woman and first African American to be elected mayor of Minneapolis, Minnesota.
  - Gaynelle Griffin Jones became the first woman (and first African American woman) to serve as the United States Attorney for the Southern District of Texas.
  - Juliann Bluitt Foster became the first woman and first African-American woman President of the American College of Dentists.
  - Elaine Jones became the first woman and first African-American woman to serve as the President and Director-Counsel of the NAACP Legal Defense Fund.
  - Bertha Pendleton became the first woman and first African-American superintendent of the San Diego Unified School District.
  - Winifred Burks-Houck became the first woman and first African-American woman president of the National Organization for the Professional Advancement of Black Chemists and Chemical Engineers (NOBCChE)
  - Joann Horton became the first woman and first African-American woman to become president of Texas Southern University.
- 1994
  - Beverly Harvard became first Black female police chief of a major city (Atlanta, Georgia) in the United States.
  - Judith Rodin was the first permanent female president of an Ivy League University (specifically, the University of Pennsylvania).
  - Alice Rivlin became the first woman to serve as Director of the Office of Management and Budget; she served under President Bill Clinton.
  - Sharon Caples McDougle became the first African American and first woman crew chief of the NASA Space Shuttle Crew Escape Equipment (CEE) processing department.
  - Carrye B. Brown became the first woman and the first African American U.S. Fire Administrator.
  - Nancy Wyman became the first woman elected state comptroller of Connecticut.
  - Dorothy Cowser Yancy became the first woman and first African-American woman president of Johnson C. Smith University.
- 1995
  - Eileen Collins was the female pilot for the Space Shuttle (on STS-63). (see 1999—first female Shuttle commander)
  - Roberta Cooper Ramo was the first female President of the American Bar Association.
  - Shirley Ann Jackson was the first African American and first woman to serve as chairman of the U.S. Nuclear Regulatory Commission (NRC).
  - Myra C. Selby became the first woman and first African American appointed to the Indiana Supreme Court
  - Carol Moseley Braun became the first woman and first African-American woman appointed to the U.S. Senate Finance Committee.
  - Rosetta Burke became the first woman and first African-American woman Brigadier general in New York state when she became the National Guard assistant adjutant general.
  - Lois Stovall Williams became the first woman and first African-American woman president of Knoxville College.
- 1996
  - Alice Rivlin became the first woman to serve as Vice Chair of the Federal Reserve.
  - Muriel A. Howard became the first woman and first African-American woman president of Buffalo State College.
  - Margaret E. M. Tolbert became the first woman and first African-American woman to be named director of a Department of Energy laboratory (New Brunswick Laboratory).
  - Joye Maureen Carter became the first African American and first woman to hold the position of Chief Medical Examiner in Texas.
  - Portia Holmes Shields became the first woman and first African-American woman president of Albany State University
- 1997
  - Madeleine Albright, born in Prague, became the first woman to serve as Secretary of State; she served under President Bill Clinton.
  - Liz Heaston was the first woman to play and score in a college football game, kicking two extra points in the 1997 Linfield vs. Willamette football game.
  - Nancy Dickey was the first female president of the American Medical Association.
  - Hazel J. Harper was the first female president of the National Dental Association.
  - Janet Rosenberg Jagan was the first American woman elected as a head of state, head of government, and commander-in-chief of a nation's armed forces, taking the role of the President of the Co‑operative Republic of Guyana.
  - Norma Holloway Johnson was the first woman and first African-American woman to serve as chief judge of the United States District Court for the District of Columbia
  - Diana Becton became the first woman and first African-American woman to serve as district attorney for Contra Costa County, California
  - Anita DeFrantz became the first woman and first African-American woman to serve as vice-president of the International Olympic Committee (IOC) executive committee.
  - Darlene Green became the first woman and first African-American woman elected comptroller of St. Louis, Missouri.
  - Violet Palmer became the first woman and first African-American woman National Basketball Association (NBA) referee.

Marie McDemmond became the first woman and first African-American woman to serve as president of Norfolk State University.

- 1998
  - Julie Taymor was the first woman to win a Tony Award for best director of a musical.
  - Fannie Gaston-Johansson was the first African American woman tenured full professor at Johns Hopkins University.
  - Joyce F. Brown became the first woman and first African American president of the Fashion Institute of Technology.
  - First woman and first Black woman U.S. Attorney for the District of Columbia: Wilma A. Lewis
  - Venus Williams became the first woman and first African-American woman to hit a tennis serve at 125 mph (clocked at Wimbledon).
  - Trudie Kibbe Reed became the first woman and first African-American woman president of Philander Smith College.
  - Joyce F. Brown became the first woman and the first African-American president of the Fashion Institute of Technology.
- 1999
  - Eileen Collins was the first female commander of a Space Shuttle mission (on STS-93). (see 1995—first female Shuttle pilot)
  - Carly Fiorina was the first woman to lead a Fortune 50 company (Hewlett-Packard) Carly Fiorina became the first female CEO of a Fortune 20 company.
  - Evelyn J. Fields became the first woman and first African American to serve as Director of the National Oceanic and Atmospheric Administration (NOAA) Corps and NOAA's Office of Marine and Aviation Operations (OMAO) as well as the first woman to become a NOAA Corps rear admiral.
  - Dianne Boardley Suber became the first woman and first African-American woman president of St. Augustine's College.

== 21st century ==
=== 2000s ===
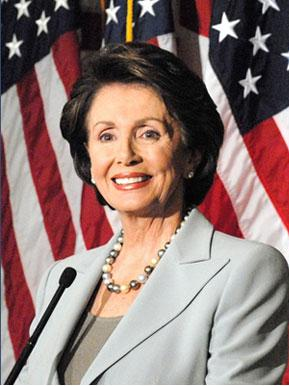
Official portrait of House Speaker Nancy Pelosi, 2007

- 2000
  - Spring – Kathleen A. McGrath became the first woman to command a U.S. Navy warship at sea.
  - June 1 – Deborah Walsh became the first woman in the U.S. Coast Guard promoted to Chief Warrant officer in Aviation Engineering (AVI).
  - July 1 – Regina Mills became the U.S. Navy's first female Aviation Deck LDO.
  - July – Lucille "Pam" Thompson became the first African-American woman to serve as a U.S. Coast Guard Special Agent; she served in this capacity until July 2004
  - Fall – General Janet E. A. Hicks was promoted to Brigadier General, becoming the first female one-star general who would later be promoted to Major General in 2002, also becoming the first two-star mother and the first female Commanding General of Ft. Gordon in Augusta, Georgia.
  - Vashti Murphy McKenzie became the first woman and first African-American woman elected bishop of the African Methodist Episcopal Church.
- 2001
  - January 3 – Hillary Clinton was the first and only former First Lady of the United States to serve in the U.S. Congress; she elected to represent New York in the U.S. Senate, making her the first woman to hold that office.
  - January 20 – Ann Veneman became the first woman to serve as Secretary of Agriculture; she served under President George W. Bush.
  - January 31 – Gale Norton became the first woman to serve as Secretary of the Interior; she served under President George W. Bush.
  - January – Condoleezza Rice was the first African-American woman and first woman National Security Advisor
  - Stephanie Ready was the first female coach of a men's professional league team in 2001, as an assistant coach for the now defunct Greenville Groove of the National Basketball Development League (the minor league of the National Basketball Association).
  - Margaret C. Wilmoth, United States Army Reserve, was promoted to Brigadier General, becoming the first nurse and first woman to command a medical brigade as a general officer.
  - Jeannette South-Paul became the first woman and first African-American woman to serve as a permanent department chair at the University of Pittsburgh (department of family medicine)
  - Consuelo Bland Marshall became the first woman and first African-American woman Chief Judge for the United States District Court for the Central District of California.
  - Algeania Freeman became the first woman and first African-American woman president of Livingstone College.
  - Carolynn Reid-Wallace became the first woman and first African-American woman president of Fisk University.
- 2002
  - January 15 – Nancy Pelosi became the first woman elected House whip, making her the first woman to hold such a position in either chamber of U.S. Congress.
  - Melanie Wood was the first American woman and the second woman overall named a Putnam Fellow.
  - Shirley Franklin became the first African-American woman and the first woman elected mayor of Atlanta, Georgia and the first African-American woman to be elected mayor of a major Southern city.
- 2003
  - January 3 – Nancy Pelosi became the first woman elected House floor leader and minority leader, making her the first woman to lead a major political party in either chamber of U.S. Congress.
  - January 8 – Kamala Harris became the first woman elected District Attorney of San Francisco.
- 2005
  - Danica Patrick was the first woman to lead the Indianapolis 500.
  - Rosa Parks was the first woman and first African-American woman to lie in honor in the U.S. Capitol.
- 2006
  - Effa Manley was the first woman inducted into the National Baseball Hall of Fame and Museum.
- 2007
  - Portia Holmes Shields became the first woman and first African-American woman to serve as chief executive officer and chief academic officer of Concordia College of Selma, Alabama.
  - January 4 – Nancy Pelosi became the first woman elected to serve as Speaker of the United States House of Representatives.

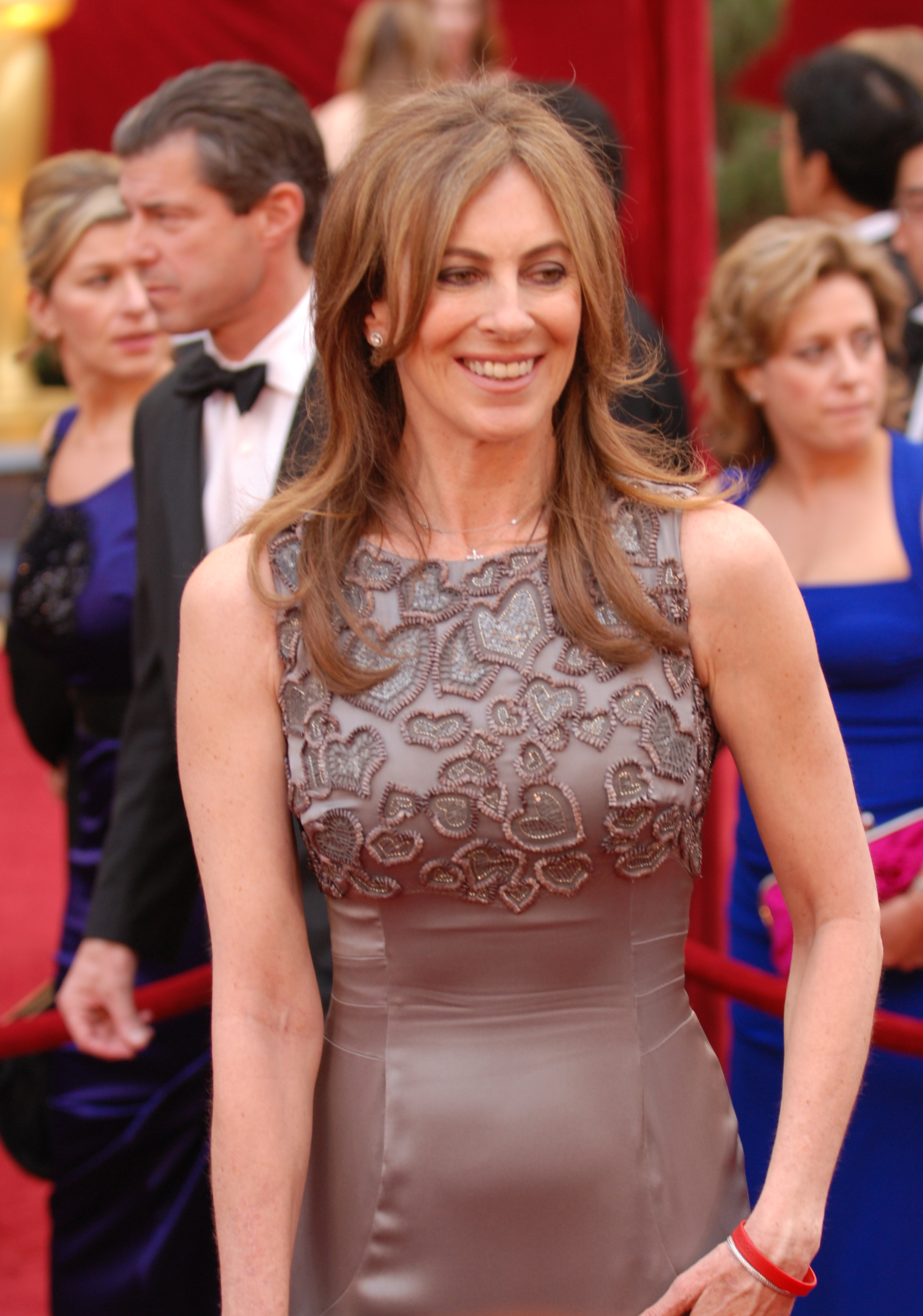
Kathryn Bigelow at 82nd Academy Awards

- 2008
  - Hillary Clinton became the first woman to win a major party's presidential nominating contest for the purposes of delegate selection when she won the New Hampshire Democratic primary on January 8. (Note: Shirley Chisholm's prior "win" in New Jersey in 1972 was in a no-delegate-awarding, presidential preference ballot that the major candidates were not listed in and that the only other candidate who was listed had already withdrawn from; the actual delegate selection vote went to George McGovern.)
  - Danica Patrick was the first woman to win an IndyCar Series by winning the 2008 Indy Japan 300.
  - Sarah Palin was the first female vice presidential nominee of the Republican Party.
  - Ann E. Dunwoody was the first female four-star general in the U.S. Army.
  - The New Hampshire Senate became the first state legislative body to hold a majority of female members (13 out of 24).
  - Evelynn M. Hammonds was the first African American and the first woman to be appointed dean of Harvard College.
- 2009
  - January 3 – Jeanne Shaheen became the first woman to hold the offices of U.S. Senator and state Governor, being elected as governor of New Hampshire from 1997 to 2003 and U.S. senator for New Hampshire since 2009.
  - January 21 – Hillary Clinton was the first former First Lady of the United States to serve in a presidential cabinet; she appointed Secretary of State under President Barack Obama.
  - January 21 – Janet Napolitano became the first woman to serve as Secretary of Homeland Security; she served under President Barack Obama.
  - Kathryn Bigelow was the first woman to win the Directors Guild of America Award for Outstanding Directing, for The Hurt Locker (2008).
  - Elinor Ostrom was the first woman to win the Nobel Prize in Economics, and since she was American, the first American woman to do so; she shared the prize with Oliver E. Williamson.
  - Nancy Lieberman became the coach of the Texas Legends in the NBA Development League, an affiliate of the Dallas Mavericks, thus making her the first woman to coach a professional men's basketball team.
  - Kathleen O'Loughlin was the first female executive director of the American Dental Association.
  - Michele Moody-Adams became the first woman and first African-American woman dean of Columbia College, Columbia University.
  - Muriel A. Howard became the first woman and first African-American president of the American Association of State Colleges and Universities.
  - Carole Smitherman became the first woman and first African-American woman mayor of Birmingham, Alabama (appointed, not elected).

=== 2010s ===
- 2010
  - Nikki Haley was the first female governor of South Carolina and the first person of an ethnic minority to serve as governor of South Carolina.
  - Kathryn Bigelow was the first woman to win the Academy Award, the BAFTA Award, and the Critics' Choice Award for Best Director, all for The Hurt Locker (2008).
  - Jennifer Gorovitz was the first woman to lead a large Jewish federation in America (specifically, the Jewish Community Federation, based in San Francisco).
  - Stephanie A. Finley became the first woman and first African-American woman U.S. Attorney to serve in Louisiana when she became the United States Attorney for the Western District of Louisiana, in Lafayette, Louisiana.
- 2011
  - Angella Reid was the first female White House Chief Usher.
  - Kamala Harris was the first woman Attorney General of California.
  - Suzan Johnson Cook was the first African American and the first woman to hold the post of United States Ambassador-at-Large for International Religious Freedom in the State Department.
  - Irene Wells became the first African-American woman and first woman mayor of Bluff City, Tennessee.
  - Portia Holmes Shields became the first woman and first African-American woman to serve as president (interim) of Tennessee State University.
- 2012
  - February 2 – Elizabeth MacDonough was the first female appointed as Parliamentarian of the United States Senate.
  - Janet Wolfenbarger was the first female four-star general in the U.S. Air Force.
  - Katy Perry was the first female artist in history to have five consecutive number-one singles on the Billboard Hot 100 from one album, thus awarding her with the Billboard Spotlight Award.
  - Shannon Eastin was the first woman to officiate a National Football League game in a pre-season matchup between the Green Bay Packers and the San Diego Chargers.
  - New Hampshire elects the first all-woman congressional delegation in U.S. history, with U.S. senators Jeanne Shaheen and Kelly Ayotte and U.S. representatives Carol Shea-Porter and Ann McLane Kuster.
  - Gabby Douglas became the first U.S. artistic gymnast (male or female) and the first African American to win both the individual all-around gold and the team gold in the same Olympic Games.
  - Jackie Lacey became the first woman and first African American elected as Los Angeles County District Attorney.
- 2013
  - Irina Krush was the first female American to hold the title of Grandmaster.
  - Danica Patrick was the first woman to win a pole in the Daytona 500 and a NASCAR Cup Series race.
  - Danica Patrick was the first woman to lead the Daytona 500.
  - Rosie Napravnik rode the filly Unlimited Budget to a 6th place finish in the 2013 Belmont, becoming the first woman to ride all three Triple Crown races in the same year.
  - Davie Jane Gilmour was the first woman to lead the Board of Directors for Little League.
  - Ashley Freiberg was the first woman to claim an overall GT3 Cup Challenge victory in North America, winning the Porsche IMSA GT3 Cup Challenge.
  - UFC 157, which took place in February, featured not only the first women's fight in UFC history but also the first UFC event headlined by two female fighters (Ronda Rousey and Liz Carmouche).
  - Rabbi Deborah Waxman was elected as the President of the Reconstructionist Rabbinical College. As the President, she is believed to have been the first woman and first lesbian to lead a Jewish congregational union, and the first female rabbi and first lesbian to lead a Jewish seminary; RRC is both a congregational union and a seminary.
  - Julia Morgan was the first woman to receive the American Institute of Architects' Gold Medal, which she received posthumously.
  - On March 1, 2013, Privateers owner and president Nicole Kirnan served as the team's coach for the first time, making her the first woman to coach a professional hockey team in the United States.
  - Erika Schmidt was the first female director of the Chicago Institute for Psychoanalysis.
  - Mia Hamm was the first woman inducted into the World Football Hall of Fame in Pachuca, Mexico.
  - General Motors named Mary Barra as its first female CEO and the first female CEO of a major automaker.
  - Deborah Rutter was named as the first female president of the Kennedy Center.
  - Jodi Eller was the first woman to complete the 1,515 mile Florida Circumnavigational Saltwater Paddling Trail.
  - The American Council of the Blind (ACB) voted unanimously to elect Kim Charlson as its president, making her the first female president of a major national blindness consumer advocacy organization in the United States.
  - Lauren Silberman was the first woman to try out at an NFL Regional Scouting Combine, and thus the first woman to try out for the NFL (she tried out as a kicker), but she did not succeed.
  - Vanessa O'Brien became the first woman to climb the highest peak on each continent (The Seven Summits) in the shortest period of time (295 days), resulting in a Guinness World Record.
  - Petrese B. Tucker became the first woman and first African-American woman to serve as Chief Judge of the United States District Court for the Eastern District of Pennsylvania.
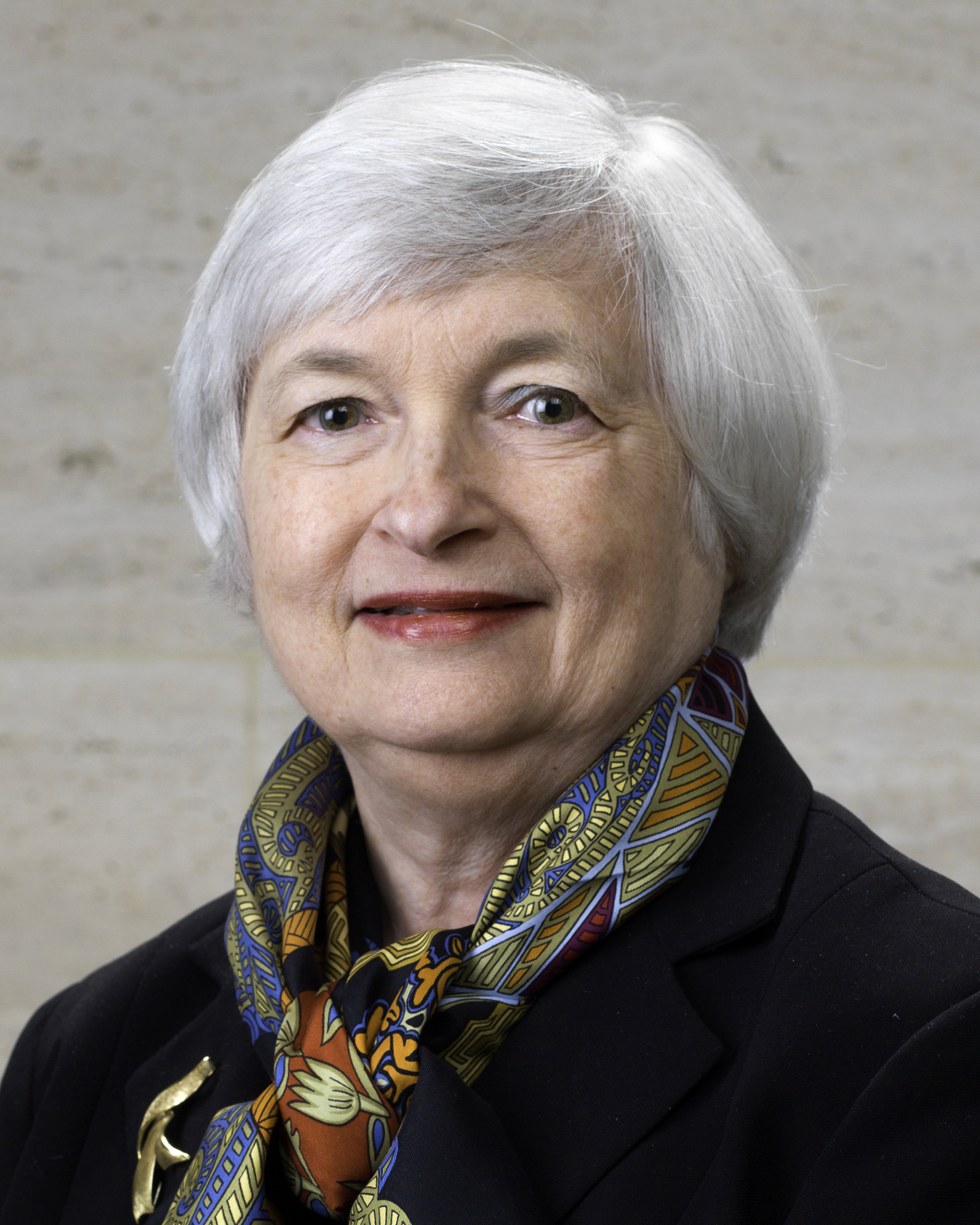
    Official portrait of Federal Reserve Chair Janet Yellen, 2015
- 2014
  - February 3 – Janet Yellen became the first woman to serve as Chair of the Federal Reserve.
  - The first women competed in ski jumping at the Olympics, including three American women – Lindsey Van, Jessica Jerome and Sarah Hendrickson.
  - Lauryn Williams was the first American woman to win a medal in both the Summer and Winter Olympic games.
  - Jennifer Welter was the first woman non-kicker or placekick-holder to play in a men's pro football game; she played running back for the Texas Revolution of the Champions Indoor Football (CIF) league.
  - Michelle J. Howard began her assignment as the U.S. Navy's first female and first female African-American four-star admiral on July 1, 2014.
  - Michele A. Roberts was elected as the Executive Director of the National Basketball Players Association, thus making her the first woman elected to the highest position of a major U.S. sport's players association.
  - During the two-week 2014 NBA Summer League in Las Vegas, Natalie Nakase was an assistant coach for the Clippers, becoming the first woman to sit on the bench as an NBA assistant. (Note: Lisa Boyer was an assistant for the Cleveland Cavaliers in 2001–02, but she neither sat on the bench nor traveled for away games, and she was paid by the Cleveland Rockers of the WNBA and not by the Cavaliers. Becky Hammon was hired by the San Antonio Spurs for the 2014–15 season, becoming the first woman to either be paid or work full-time as an NBA assistant.)
  - Becky Hammon became the first full-time female coach in the NBA – and the first full-time female coach in any of the four major professional sports in America – as an assistant coach for the San Antonio Spurs.
  - Anne B. France won the inaugural Landmark Award for Outstanding Contributions to NASCAR.
  - Katie Higgins was the first female pilot to join the Blue Angels, the U.S. Navy's flight demonstration squadron.
  - Dr. Connie McCaa became the first American woman and the first Mississippi doctor inducted into the American Academy of Ophthalmology's Hall of Fame.
  - Suzy Whaley became the first female officer in the PGA, as PGA secretary.
  - Susan Morrison was named as the first female executive pastry chef at the White House.
  - Megan Smith was named as the first female Chief Technology Officer of the United States.
  - Megan Brennan was named as the first female United States Postmaster General.
  - Joanne Berger-Sweeney was the first woman and the first African American to serve as president of Trinity College (Connecticut).
  - Chavonda Jacobs-Young became the first African American and first woman to lead the Agricultural Research Service (ARS).
  - Mo'ne Davis became the first female pitcher to throw a shutout and earn a win in Little League World Series history.
  - Michele Johnson became the first woman and first African American full professor of Radiology and Biomedical Imaging and of Neurosurgery at the Yale School of Medicine.
  - Lovely Warren became the first female mayor, first African-American female mayor, and second African-American mayor overall of Rochester, New York.
- 2015
  - Jennifer Welter became the first American woman hired to coach in men's pro football when the Texas Revolution of the Champions Indoor Football (CIF) league announced that Welter was hired to coach linebackers and special teams.
  - The U.S. Senate confirmed Michelle K. Lee as the Under Secretary of Commerce for Intellectual Property and Director of the United States Patent and Trademark Office (USPTO). Lee is the first woman and the first person of color to lead the USPTO.
  - Yumi Hogan became the first Korean American first lady of a U.S. state and the first Asian-American first lady in the history of Maryland.
  - Darcel Clark became the first woman to be elected Bronx County District Attorney and the first African-American woman to be elected as a District Attorney in the State of New York.
  - Maria Thompson became the first woman and first African-American woman president of Coppin State University.
  - Paula T. Hammond became the first woman and first person of color appointed as head of an academic department in the School of Engineering at the Massachusetts Institute of Technology (MIT) when she was appointed head of the Chemical Engineering department.
- 2016
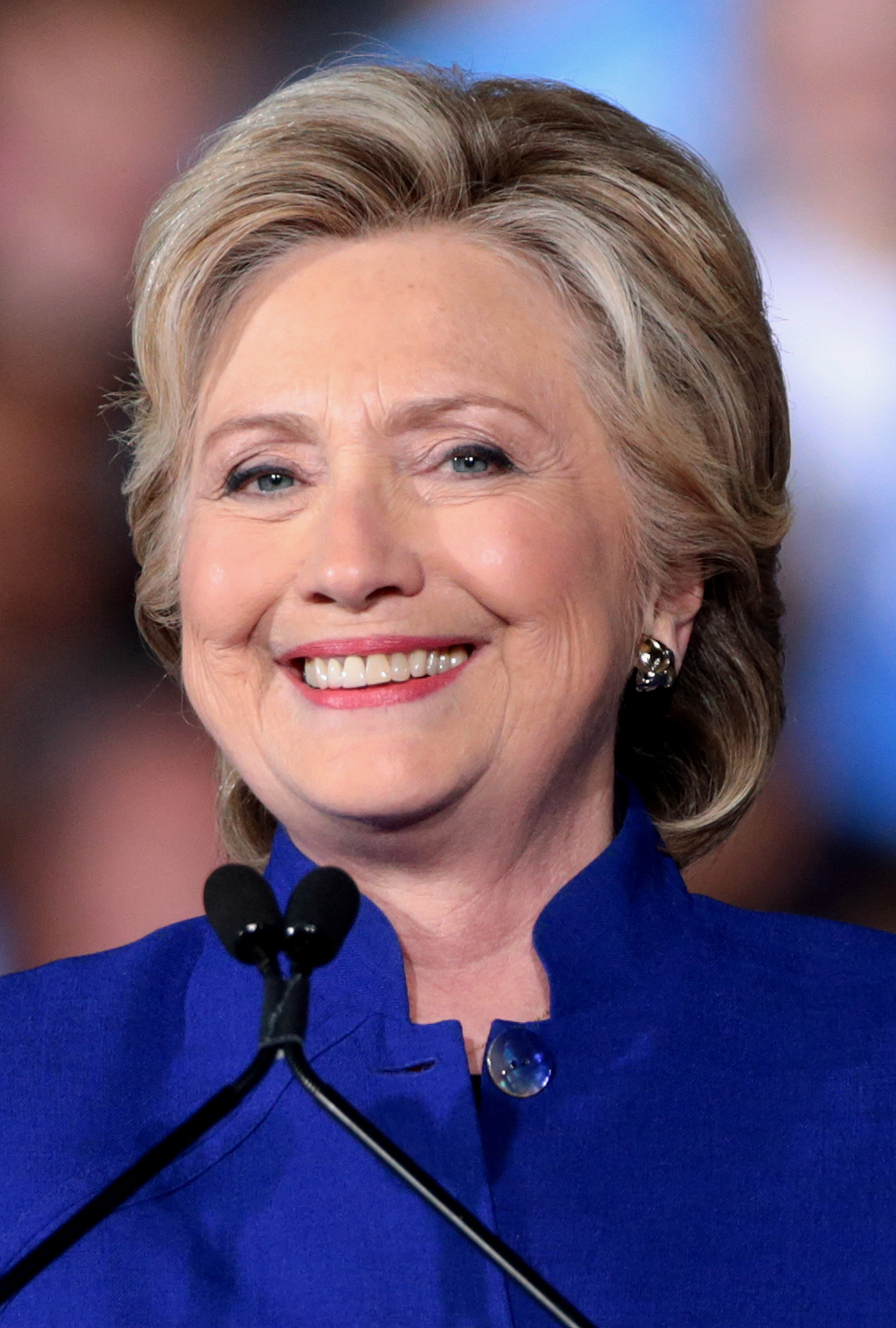
  - Hillary Clinton, first woman nominated by a major political party for president
    Taylor Swift became the first woman to win Album of the Year twice.
  - July 26 – Hillary Clinton was formally nominated at the 2016 Democratic National Convention in Philadelphia, becoming the first woman nominated for president by a major U.S. political party.
  - Hillary Clinton became the first woman to win the popular vote in a United States presidential election and one of the two first women to receive an electoral vote for president.
  - Carla Hayden became the first female and the first African American Librarian of Congress.
  - Kellyanne Conway became the first woman to run a successful presidential campaign.
  - Faith Spotted Eagle became the first Native American and one of the two first women to receive an electoral vote for president, which she received from a faithless elector.
  - General Lori Robinson became the first female officer to command a major Unified Combatant Command in the history of the US Armed Forces.
  - Adena Friedman became the first female CEO of NASDAQ.
  - Amy Sherald became the first woman and the first African American to win the National Portrait Gallery's Outwin Boochever Portrait Competition.
- 2017
  - Peggy Whitson broke the record for most total days spent in space by any NASA astronaut.
  - Danica Patrick became the first woman to lead the Coca-Cola 600.
  - Vanessa O'Brien became the first woman to summit K2, the second tallest mountain, at 28,251 feet.
  - Briana Scurry became the first woman goalkeeper and first African-American woman to be elected to the National Soccer Hall of Fame.
  - Shonda Rhimes became the first woman and first African American to create three television dramas that have achieved the 100 episode milestone.
  - Dana Canedy became the first woman and first African American administrator of the Pulitzer Prizes.
  - G. Gabrielle Starr became the first woman and the first African American president of Pomona College.
  - Ruth Simmons became the first woman and first African-American woman president of Prairie View A&M University
- 2018
  - Oprah Winfrey became the first African American woman to receive the Golden Globe Cecil B. DeMille Award
  - Gina Haspel became the first woman to be Director of the Central Intelligence Agency.
  - Stacey Cunningham became the first female President of the New York Stock Exchange.
  - Ellie Morrison became the first woman elected National Commissioner of the Boy Scouts of America; likewise, she became the first woman to hold a position in the BSA's "Key Three", consisting of the National Commissioner, the Chief Scout Executive, and the National Chair.
  - Carla Provost became the first female chief of the United States Border Patrol on August 9, 2018.
  - Deb Haaland of New Mexico and Sharice Davids of Kansas became the first Native American women to be elected to Congress.
  - Rashida Tlaib of Michigan and Ilhan Omar of Minnesota became the first Muslim women to be elected to Congress.
  - Martha McSally of Arizona became the first female senator who was appointed to Congress after losing an election to a future Senate colleague, and also the first to serve alongside someone who defeated her in the election prior to inauguration.
- 2019
  - January 3 – Nancy Pelosi became the first woman elected to serve as Speaker of the United States House of Representatives for non-consecutive terms.
  - Ghazala Hashmi became the first Muslim woman elected to the Senate of Virginia.
  - Carolyn Kindle Betz was among the first female-majority owners (i.e. Major League Soccer investors) to be awarded an MLS franchise, eventually named St. Louis City SC.
  - Andrea Stewart-Cousins became the first woman and the first African-American woman to lead the New York State Legislative Chamber
  - Adrienne A. Jones became the first African American and first woman elected Speaker of the Maryland House of Delegates.

=== 2020s ===
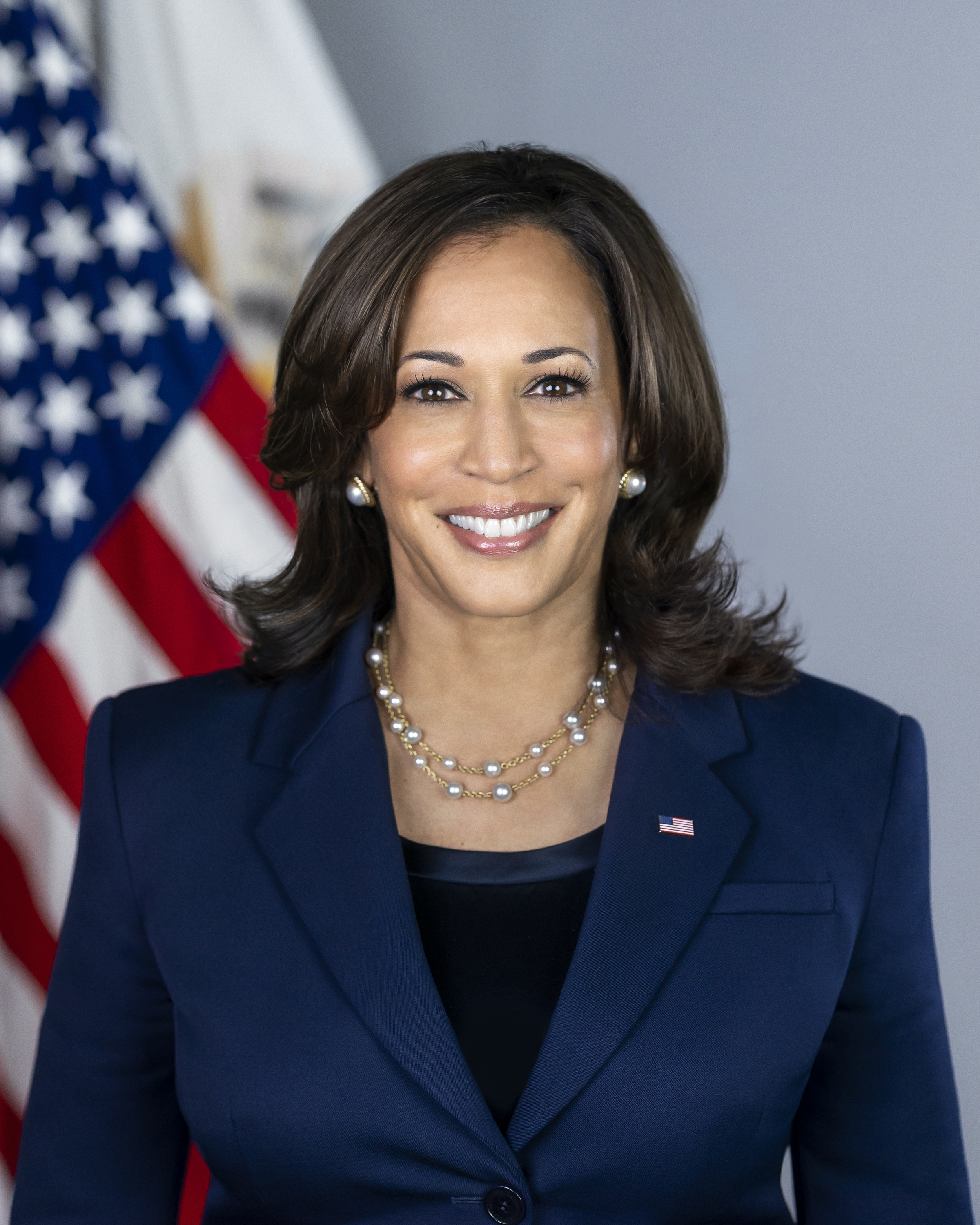
Official portrait of Vice President Kamala Harris, 2021.

- 2020
  - January 26 – Billie Eilish became the first woman to win all four General Field categories in one ceremony at the 62nd Annual Grammy Awards
  - August 19 – Kamala Harris of California was formally nominated by the 2020 Democratic National Convention as the Democratic candidate for vice president of the United States, becoming the first woman of color, the first African American, the first Asian American, the first person of South Asian descent, the first person of Indian ancestry, and the first person of Jamaican ancestry to be nominated on a major party ticket.
  - Ruth Bader Ginsburg became the first woman to lie in repose at the Supreme Court Building on September 23 and, the following day, became the first woman to lie in repose there for a second day.
  - On September 25, Ruth Bader Ginsburg lay in state at the Capitol, becoming the first woman to do so.
  - November 7 – Kamala Harris became the first woman elected as Vice President of the United States.
  - November 28 – Sarah Fuller became the first woman to play in a Power 5 football game.
  - December 30 – Becky Hammon became the first female acting head coach in NBA history.
  - Erika H. James became the first African-American woman and first woman to be named dean of the Wharton School of the University of Pennsylvania.
  - Ella Jones became the first woman and first African American to be elected mayor of Ferguson, Missouri.
- 2021
  - January 20 – Kamala Harris inaugurated as the first woman to serve as Vice President of the United States, making her the most powerful woman in America's political history, first in the line of succession to the US Presidency.
  - January 20 – Kamala Harris became the first woman President of the United States Senate in U.S. history.
  - January 20 – Jill Biden became the first non-Catholic first lady married to a Catholic president.
  - January 21 – Avril Haines became the first woman to serve as Director of National Intelligence; she served under President Joe Biden.
  - January 26 – Janet Yellen became the first woman to serve as Secretary of the Treasury; she served under President Joe Biden.
  - November 19 – Kamala Harris became the first woman to serve as Acting President of the United States in American history.
  - Ayanna Howard became the first woman and first African-American woman to lead the Ohio State University College of Engineering
  - Kristen Clarke became the first woman and first African-American woman to serve as the assistant attorney general for the Civil Rights Division at the United States Department of Justice.
- 2022
  - Keechant Sewell became the first African-American woman and first woman to be the police commissioner of the New York Police Department.
  - Patricia L. Turner was the first African American, and first woman to serve as executive director and chief executive officer of the American College of Surgeons.
  - Karen Bass became the first woman and second African American elected mayor of Los Angeles.
- 2023
  - January 3 - Patty Murray becomes the first female President pro tempore of the United States Senate.
  - Amera Gilchrist became the first woman and first African-American woman to lead the Pittsburgh Bureau of Emergency Medical Services.
  - Lisa Franchetti became the first woman Chief of Naval Operations and first woman to serve on the Joint Chiefs of Staff
- 2024
  - March 3–5 – Nikki Haley became the first woman to win a Republican presidential nominating contest when she won the District of Columbia primary, and the first to win a Republican state primary when she won Vermont.
  - November 6 – Sarah McBride was elected as the first trans woman in the United States House of Representatives, making her the first openly transgender member of the United States Congress.
  - Alyce Clarke became the first woman and first African American to have their portrait on display at the Mississippi State Capitol.
  - Cherelle Parker became the first woman and first African-American woman to serve as mayor of Philadelphia, Pennsylvania.
- 2025
  - Patty Murray became the first female President pro tempore emerita of the United States Senate.
  - Lisa Blunt Rochester became the first woman and first African American to represent Delaware in both chambers of Congress.
  - Susie Wiles became the first female White House Chief of Staff.
- 2026
  - Autumn Durald Arkapaw became the first woman, and first African American, to win the Academy Award for Best Cinematography (Sinners).

== See also ==
- History of the United States
- History of women in the United States
- List of the first women holders of political offices in the United States
- Timeline of women in the United States
- Timeline of women hazzans in America
- Timeline of women in dentistry in America
- Timeline of women in mathematics in America
- Timeline of women rabbis in America
- Women's education in the United States
- Women's History Sites (U.S. National Park Service)
- Women's suffrage in the United States
- Women in the military by country § United States
