= Leah Lowenstein =

American academic administrator (1930–1984)

- Born: Leah Miriam Hiller; June 17, 1930; Milwaukee, Wisconsin, US
- Died: March 6, 1984 (aged 53); Wellesley, Massachusetts, US
- Education: University of Wisconsin School of Medicine and Public Health (MD); Somerville College, Oxford (DPhil)
- Known for: First woman dean of a co-ed medical school in the US
- Spouse: John Lowenstein
- Children: 3
- Scientific career
- Fields: Nephrology
- Workplaces: Tufts University School of Medicine; Harvard Medical School; Boston University School of Medicine; Jefferson Medical College

Leah Miriam Lowenstein (née Hiller; June 17, 1930 – March 6, 1984) was an American nephrologist and academic administrator. In 1982, she became the first woman dean of a co-educational, medical school in the United States upon her appointment at Jefferson Medical College. Lowenstein was previously associate dean and professor of medicine and biochemistry at the Boston University School of Medicine. She served in the Carter administration as a medical advisor to the Assistant Secretary for Health. Lowenstein was an advocate for women in medicine.

== Early life and education ==
Leah Miriam Hiller was born on June 17, 1930, to Sarah Hiller in Milwaukee, Wisconsin. She had three sisters. Lowenstein completed her B.S. at the University of Wisconsin. As a semiprofessional cellist, Lowenstein completed most of medical school at the University of Wisconsin School of Medicine and Public Health on a music scholarship. She was awarded the funds for four years and it went unnoticed by the university when she enrolled in medical school during her third year. She earned extra money by playing in a string trio. Completing her doctor of medicine in 1954, she was one of only three women in her medical class. Lowenstein was a member of Phi Beta Kappa and Alpha Omega Alpha.

She completed her internship at the UW Health University Hospital in Madison, Wisconsin. Lowenstein was a research associate in the department of anatomy at the University of Oxford for three years, where she earned a DPhil at Somerville College in 1958. Her dissertation was titled "Some cytological problems in haematology". She completed a residency at Beth Israel Deaconess Medical Center in 1959. In 1960, she completed a fellowship in renal and metabolic diseases at the Veterans Administration Hospital at Tufts.

== Career ==
Lowenstein was an attending physician at Boston Medical Center and a physician-in-chief at Boston City Hospital (BCH). She was the medical director of the alcohol research unit at Harvard Medical School and BCH. Lowenstein held academic positions at the Tufts University School of Medicine and the Thorndike Memorial Laboratory of Harvard Medical School. During her sabbatical between 1967 and 1968, Lowenstein researched with Stanton Segal in his garage laboratory.

In 1968, Lowenstein joined Boston University School of Medicine (BUSM). She was the director of basic and clinical sciences of the Gerontology Center at BUSM and the director of the Unit of Metabolic Nephrology. According to the archives of the American Society of Nephrology, Lowenstein's group was the first to study cellular mechanisms in metabolic disease. They evaluated membrane turnover in normal states, renal hypertrophy, and acute renal failure. In 1974, she became assistant dean and was promoted to associate dean and professor of medicine and biochemistry in 1977. From 1978 to 1979, she commuted by plane from Boston to Washington, D.C. to serve in the Carter administration as a medical consultant to the Assistant Secretary for Health. Lowenstein was also a member of study sections at the National Institutes of Health. In 1984, John Sandson, dean of the BUSM, called Lowenstein an "outstanding leader" in the field of medicine and praised her work in "science, teaching, administration, and clinical care" along with her contributions that helped to advance "the role of women in medicine."

Lowenstein was appointed dean and vice president of Jefferson Medical College (JMC) in 1981, becoming the first woman dean of a co-educational, medical school in the United States. Lowenstein succeeded interim dean Frank D. Gray Jr. who replaced William Kellow following his death. She began on July 1, 1982, and worked at JMC for 18 months.

Lowenstein was an advocate for women in medicine.

== Personal life ==
Lowenstein was married to English biochemist John Lowenstein. They moved to England in the late 1950s while he worked at the University of Oxford. He later taught at Brandeis University upon their return to New England. They have three sons, Charles J. Lowenstein MD, Andrew Lowenstein, and Marc Lowenstein. Lowenstein died from cancer in Wellesley, Massachusetts, on March 6, 1984. Lowenstein was Jewish.

== Awards and honors ==
Lowenstein was a member of the Institute of Medicine and a Fellow of the American Association for the Advancement of Science. She served as president of the New England Chapter of the American Medical Women's Association in the 1970s. In 1983, she received an alumni award from University of Wisconsin for her service to medicine and medical education, leadership, and commitment to the scientific community.

== Selected works ==
- Shapiro, Eileen C.; Lowenstein, Leah M. (1979). Becoming a Physician: Development of Values and Attitudes in Medicine. Ballinger Publishing Company. ISBN 978-0-88410-527-5.

== See also ==
- History of medicine in the United States
- List of American women's firsts
- Timeline of women in science
