= Timeline of women in the United States =

History of women in the US

This is a timeline of women in the history of America, noting important events relevant in American women's history. For a detailed timeline of individual American women's firsts, see the List of American women's firsts.

== Timeline ==
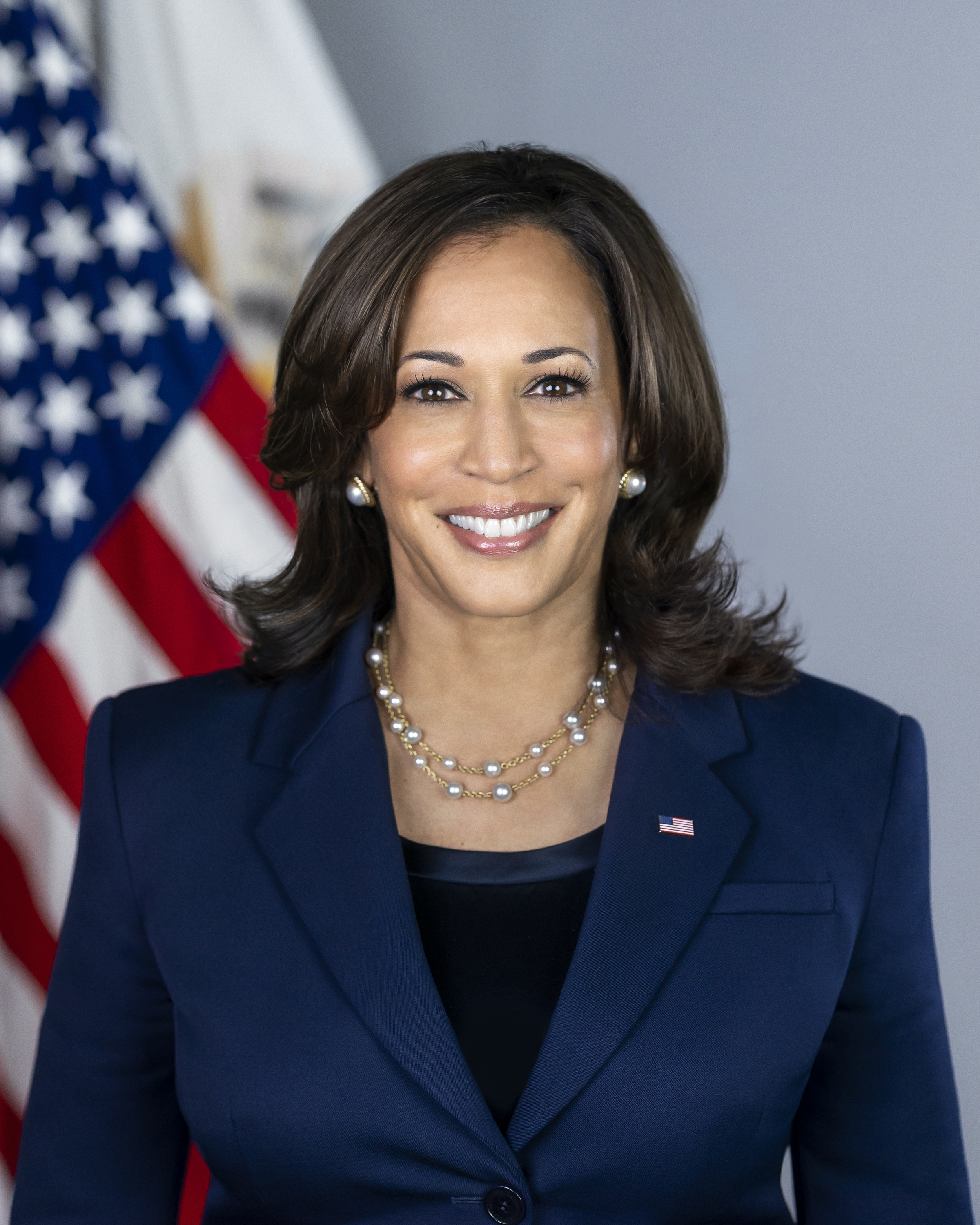
Official portrait of Kamala Harris, 2021

1756: Lydia Taft is the first woman to vote legally in Colonial America.

1821: Emma Willard founds the Troy Female Seminary in New York; it is the first school in the country founded to provide young women with a college-level education.

1837: The first American convention held to advocate women's rights was the 1837 Anti-Slavery Convention of American Women held in 1837.

1837: Oberlin College becomes the first American college to admit women.

1840: The first petition for a law granting married women the right to own property was established in 1840.

1845: Lowell Female Labor Reform Association opened in 1845 as the first major labor union.

1848: The Seneca Falls Convention, the first women's rights convention, is held in Seneca Falls, New York.

1855: New York Women's Hospital opened in 1855 as the first hospital solely devoted to ailments affiliated with women.

1869: Wyoming is the first territory to give women the right to vote.

1870: Louisa Ann Swain is the first woman in the United States to vote in a general election. She cast her ballot on September 6, 1870, in Laramie, Wyoming.

1870: The first all-female jury in America is sworn on March 7, 1870, in Laramie, Wyoming.

1874: Mary Ewing Outerbridge, from Staten Island, introduces tennis to America, creating the first American tennis court at the Staten Island Cricket and Baseball Club.

1892: The first women's basketball game was played at Smith College, and conducted by Senda Berenson.

1916: Jeannette Rankin becomes the first woman to hold high office in the United States when she is elected to Congress, as a Republican from Montana.

1916: The first birth control clinic in America is opened by Margaret Sanger.

1940: The first social security beneficiary was Ida May Fuller, she received check 00-000-001 in the amount of $22.54.

1948: The Women's Armed Services Integration Act gives women permanent status in the Regular and Reserve forces of the Air Force, Army, Navy, and Marine Corps.

1965: In Griswold v. Connecticut, the Supreme Court rules that Connecticut's ban on the use of contraceptives violates the right to marital privacy.

1972: The US Congress passes the Equal Rights Amendment, which stipulates that "Equality of rights under the law shall not be denied or abridged by the United States or by any State on account of sex."

1972: Title IX is passed as a portion of the Education Amendments of 1972, which states (in part) that: "No person in the United States shall, on the basis of sex, be excluded from participation in, be denied the benefits of, or be subjected to discrimination under any education program or activity receiving federal financial assistance."

1973: Roe v. Wade rules unconstitutional a state law that banned abortions except to save the life of the mother. The Supreme Court rules that the states are forbidden from outlawing or regulating any aspect of abortion performed during the first trimester of pregnancy, can only enact abortion regulations reasonably related to maternal health in the second and third trimesters, and can enact abortion laws protecting the life of the fetus only in the third trimester. Even then, an exception has to be made to protect the life of the mother.

1978: The Pregnancy Discrimination Act of 1978 amends Title VII of the Civil Rights Act of 1964 to prohibit sex discrimination on the basis of pregnancy.

1980: Women first graduated from the U.S. service academies.

1989: In Webster v. Reproductive Health Services, the Supreme Court upheld a Missouri law that imposed restrictions on the use of state funds, facilities, and employees in performing, assisting with, or counseling on abortions.

1996: The Matter of Kasinga case sets a precedent allowing asylum seekers to seek asylum from gender-based persecution.

1996: In United States v. Virginia, the US Supreme Court struck down the Virginia Military Institute (VMI)'s long-standing male-only admission policy in a 7-1 decision.

2009: The Lilly Ledbetter Fair Pay Act of 2009 is signed into law, which states that the 180-day statute of limitations for filing an equal-pay lawsuit regarding pay discrimination resets with each new paycheck affected by that discriminatory action.

2016: Former First Lady, Senator of New York, and Secretary of State Hillary Clinton clinches the nomination for the Democratic Party, becoming the first female candidate for president on the ballot of a major party.

2020: Former United States senator from California, 32nd Attorney General of California, and 27th District Attorney of San Francisco; Kamala Harris was elected the first female vice president of the United States.

2021: Kamala Harris served as the first female Acting President of the United States.

== See also ==
- List of American women's firsts – Chronological listing of firsts for American women
- List of the first women holders of political offices in the United States
- History of women in the United States
- Timeline of women hazzans in America
- Timeline of women in dentistry in America
- Timeline of women in mathematics in America
- Timeline of women rabbis in America
