= Frances Miriam Whitcher =

American humorist

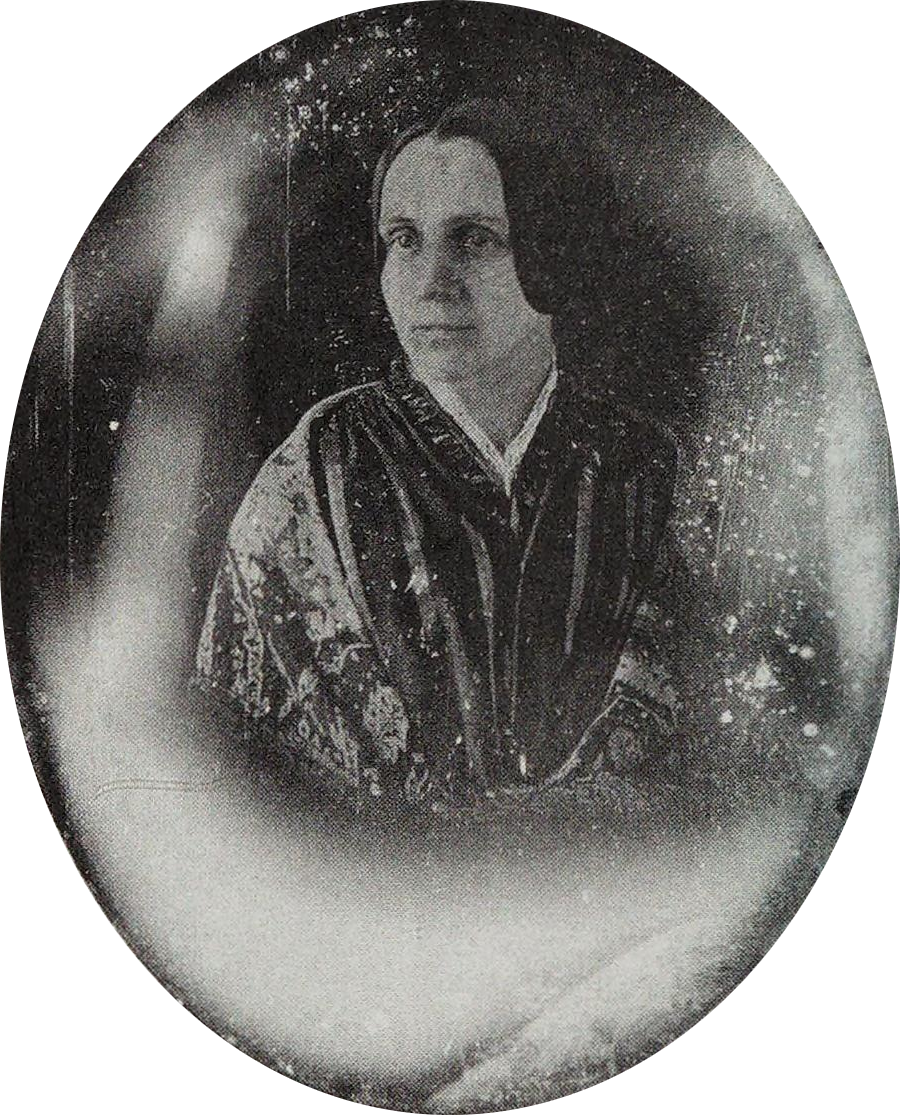
- Photograph of Whitcher, held by the Dunham Public Library, Whitesboro, New York
- Born: Frances Miriam Berry; November 1, 1811; Whitestown, New York
- Died: January 4, 1852 (aged 40); Whitestown, New York
- Occupation(s): Writer, humorist

Frances Miriam Berry Whitcher (1 November 1811–4 January 1852) was an American humorist, born in Whitestown, New York. Whitcher may have been the first significant woman prose humorist in the United States.

== Early life ==
Frances Miriam Berry was born November 1, 1811, in Whitestown, Oneida County, New York. She was the daughter of Elizabeth Wells and innkeeper Lewis Berry. From a young age she was observed to have talent for writing and drawing.

== Writing ==
Whitcher contributed poems to the Saturday Gazette and Godey's Lady's Book during the 1840s. Her humorous creation, the comic fool the Widow Bedott (1856), made her a celebrity, and sold 100,000 copies during the decade following its publication. Whitcher used her characters to satirize gentility, including issues such as fashion, social status, courtship, and hypocrisy. In 1855, The Widow Bedott Papers was gathered from her writings and published in book form, featuring the Widow Bedott. Afterwards, David R. Locke fashioned a coarsely amusing play starring Bedott.

== Personal life ==
On January 6, 1847, at the age of 35, she married Rev. Benjamin Williams Whitcher, and in the Spring of that year moved with her new husband to Elmira, New York, where he became the Rector of Trinity Church in April 1847. She had to put herself more into the public eye as a minister's wife. She died January 4, 1852, in Whitestown, New York.
