= Lillian Baumbach Jacobs =

Female master plumber

- Born: January 4, 1930; Washington, D.C., U.S.
- Died: January 31, 2000 (aged 70); Durham, North Carolina, U.S.
- Occupation: Plumber
- Spouses: George William Jacobs (m. 1951; div. 1980) Howard Herbert Lamb (m. 1981, divorced)
- Children: 2

Lillian Ann Baumbach Jacobs (January 4, 1930 – January 31, 2000) was an American plumber notable for being the first woman in the United States to earn a master plumber's license.

== Early life ==
Born at Georgetown University Hospital in Washington, D.C., she was the eldest child of plumber and inventor William James Baumbach and Louise Ann Carter Baumbach. Growing up in Arlington, Virginia, Jacobs assisted in her father's plumbing business during summer jobs and service calls, which provided her early exposure to the trade.

== Education and career ==
She graduated from Washington-Lee High School in 1947. In 1951, at the age of 21, Jacobs passed the master plumbing examination with one of the highest scores in her class, becoming the first female master plumber in the United States. Her achievement in obtaining the license was reported by various newspapers and magazines, and she made television appearances, including a guest spot on What's My Line? as well as an interview with Walter Cronkite. During the Korean War, she became pen pals with 250 American troops and was selected as the pin-up girl for an infantry company.

Jacobs worked in the front office of her father's plumbing business in Fairfax, Virginia, where she eventually assumed a managerial role. Prior to her retirement in 1989, she served as the company president.

== Personal life ==
Jacobs married George William Jacobs on September 12, 1951, and the couple had two daughters, Wendy and Lydia. Their marriage ended in divorce in 1980. In 1981, she married Howard Lamb, however, they also later divorced.

Jacobs died of leukemia on January 31, 2000, at the age of 70.
