= Irene Williams Coit =

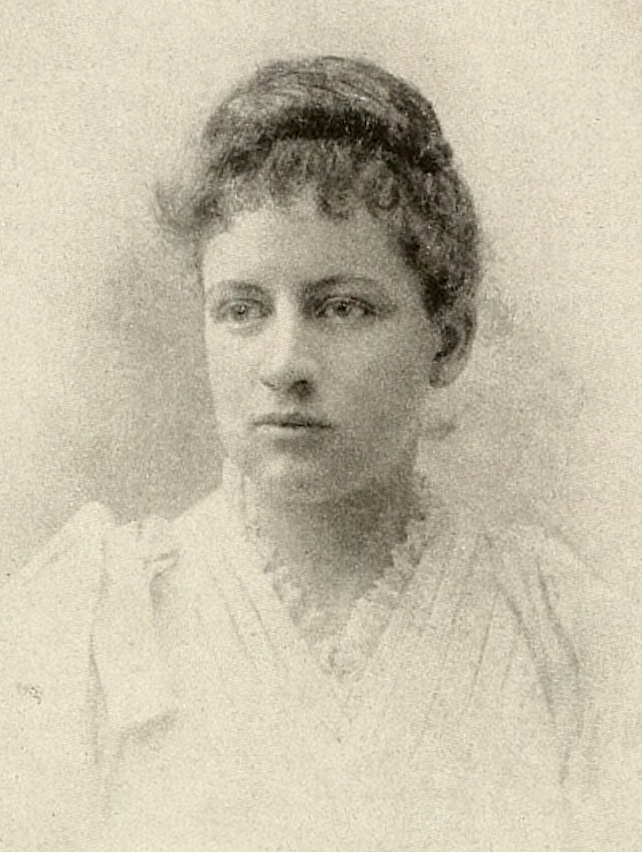
Irene Williams Coit

Irene Williams Coit (September 24, 1872 – August 2, 1945) won a reputation by being the first woman passing the Yale College entrance examination in 1891, an event that was instrumental to the cause of co-education in American colleges.

== Early life ==
Irene Williams Coit was born in Norwich, Connecticut, United States, on September 24, 1872. She was the only daughter of General James Bolles Coit (1836-1894), a distinguished soldier in the Civil War. During the administration of President Cleveland he was chief of a pension bureau in Washington. Her mother, Anne Willoughby (1849-1914), was the daughter of A. P. Willoughby, representing one of the oldest families in Norwich.

She took the full classical course in the Norwich free academy and was graduated in June 1891, with highest honors. Her determination to try the Yale examinations with the male classical students of her class, was born solely of her generous ambition. Her instructor, Dr. Robert P. Keep, arranged to have Prof. Seymour, of Yale, give Coil an examination with his class. She was accepted on July 8, 1891 and The New York Times wrote: "She is the only young woman who has taken the examinations at Yale University and been notified by the Faculty that, except for reasons of sex, she is in every way fitted for the institution." A year after she took the exam, two more women passed it.

== Career ==
"If the boys can do it, I don’t see why the girls can’t."

— Irene Coit

Besides her aptitude as a student, Coit manifested a marked literary capacity. Her first essay in the field of letters was especially successful. Since the summer of 1891 she contributed to various newspapers and publications a variety of articles.

In 1893, she moved to Geneva to teach in the DeLancey Private School where she was employed for two years until her marriage. For a half century, from her marriage in 1895 until serving as postmaster of Geneva, she was a leader in Geneva civic affairs.

== Personal life ==
On September 10, 1895, she married Henry Bronson Graves (1860-1955), the postmaster of Geneva, and had 7 children: Henry Bronson Graves (1896-1980), Richard Nelson Graves (1898-1919), Ralph Coit Graves (1901-1959), Elizabeth Constance Graves (1906-1945), Eleanor Howland Graves (1907-2000), Irene Willoughby Graves (1908-1999), and Barbara Ann Graves (1913–2017?).

She died on August 2, 1945, aged 72, and is buried at Glenwood Cemetery, Geneva, New York.
