= Alice K. Kurashige =

Alice K. Kurashige was the first Japanese-American woman to be commissioned in the US Marine Corps, reaching the rank of captain. She served between 1965 and 1970.

The daughter of Akira and Kyomi Kurashige of San Diego, California, Alice had two uncles who served in the Marines and was always interested in being in it. She and her family spent time in a concentration camp in Arizona during World War II where she remembers being hungry and living in shacks. After graduating from San Diego State College in 1964, she attended Officers Candidate School where she saw a female Marine for the first time in her life. She was commissioned five months after graduation. From November 1969 to May 1970, she was commanding officer of Women Marine Company, Headquarters Battalion at Barstow, California's Marine Corps Supply Center, along with First Lieutenant Rebecca M. Kraft, Captain Joan M. Hammond, First Lieutenant Diane L. Hamel, First Lieutenant Geraldine E. Peeler, Captain Vanda K. Brame, and First Lieutenant Linda J. Lenhart. According to Linda Cates Lacy's We Are the Marines! World War I to the Present, she was also the first woman to be assigned a Food Service Officer in the Marine Corps since World War II, after completing 12-week course in food service supervision at Fort Lee (Virginia).
