= Halli Reid =

American swimmer

Halli Reid is the first woman to swim across Lake Erie, which she completed around August 9, 1993 at the age of 24, swimming from Long Point, Ontario, to Freeport Beach in North East, Pennsylvania, in 17 hours. Around 200 people greeted her as she first came ashore at Freeport Beach. It is estimated she was the fourth person to make the swim. Recalling the swim years later, she said one of her primary obstacles to completing it was a feeling of serious pain in her shoulder, and she stated to a reporter, "I would never, ever do it again". Her brother Clint stayed close in an escort boat for her safety. In acknowledgement of her accomplishment, a park in Freeport Beach, at the foot of Route 89 in North East Township in Pennsylvania, was renamed "Halli Reid Park" with a plaque designating it as such, and 9 August was designated "Halli Reid Day" by the mayor of North East, where Reid is from. Reid, who had worked as a YMCA swim coach, and at times as a lifeguard at the beach since the ninth grade, said she trained for the swim for about two years. At only 5' 2", and 120 pounds, doctors were concerned she would not complete the swim due to the cold, as she did not gain any additional weight during the first year of her training. However, she was able to gain an additional twenty pounds in her second year of preparation. Water temperature in early August usually range in the mid-70F range and slightly upward, but at night with winds the temperature could have been closer to mid-70's or lower. She was a mid-twenties college graduate at the time of the swim, and was also working part time at her family's lumber yard.

== Distance and time ==
Reid took seventeen hours to swim a distance she estimated at 24.3 miles (39.1 km), though a direct line from the two points would have been closer to 21 miles. Current and drifting off course likely accounted for the extra few miles. She wore no wetsuit, just a bathing suit and a coating of grease. High winds in the middle of the night made the swim a difficult effort, and for around two hours during the night she swam making relatively little progress with waves frequently striking her in the face. She left the Canadian shore about 5:45 pm Sunday, and arrived at Freeport Beach in the town of North East, Pennsylvania at 10:28 am Monday. Local coverage stated she was coached by Brent Peters. Her statements to the press indicated she did not plan to do the swim again.

Reid was inspired to reach her goal after seeing Bob North and Harvey Snell swim across Lake Erie four years earlier, and also hoped to become the first woman to finish the swim.

On August 8, 2005, Sara McClure, also of North East, Pennsylvania, did the swim in 15:2:19, breaking Halli's record by close to two hours. Press coverage cited a distance of 23.7 miles. Two previous women had been credited with completing the swim since Halli Reid, Paula Stephanson, and Paula Jongerden. Halli's swim was recognized by the Lake Erie Open Water Swimming Association.
