= Emma Amelia Hall =

American prison reformer and administrator (1837–1884)

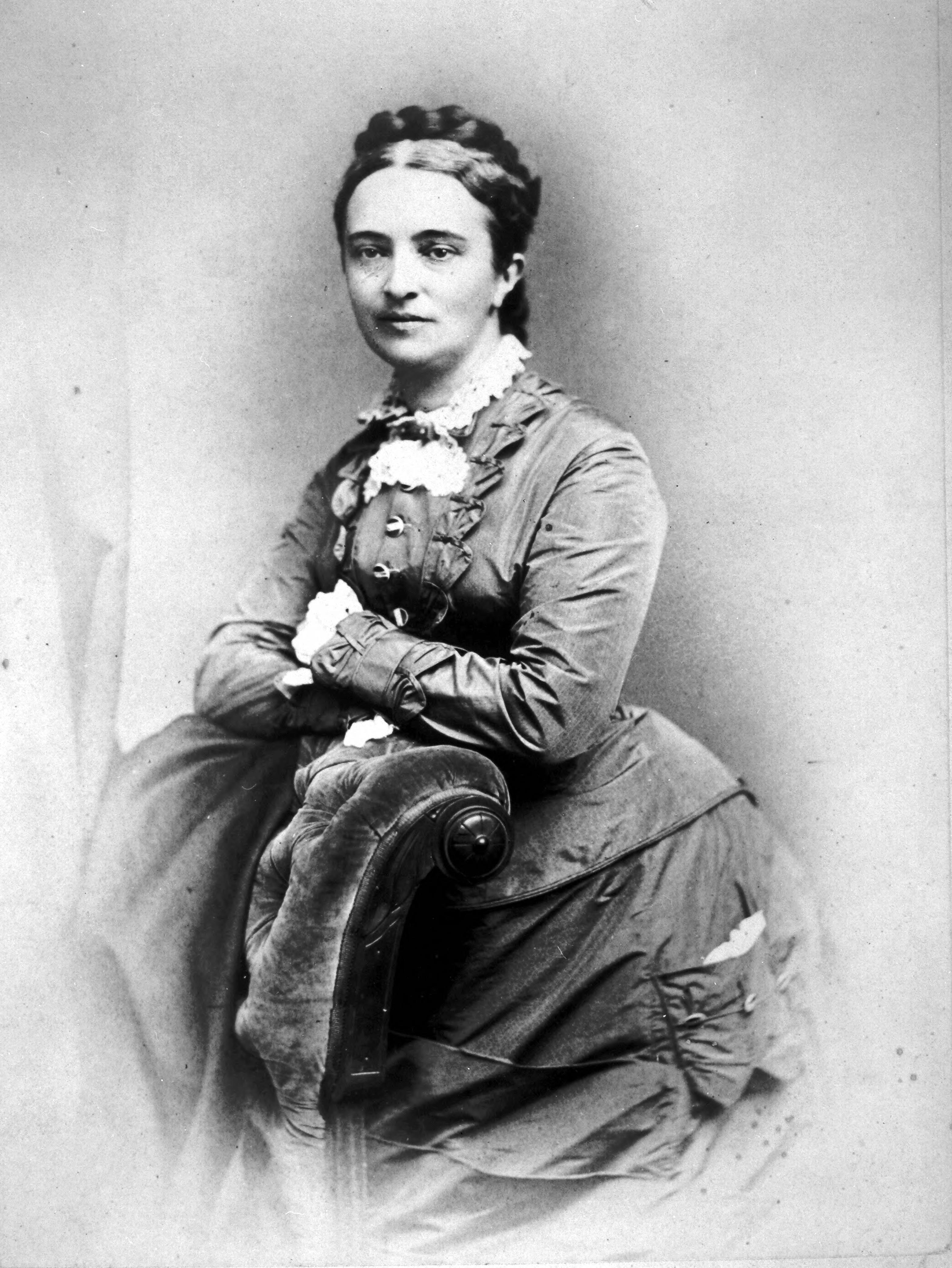
- Portrait taken in Brooklyn, NY, circa 1850–1870
- Born: February 28, 1837; Raisin Charter Township, Michigan, U.S.
- Died: December 27, 1884 (aged 47); Albuquerque, New Mexico Territory, U.S.

Emma Amelia Hall (February 28, 1837 – December 27, 1884) was an American prison reformer and administrator. In July 1881, she became the first superintendent of Michigan's Girls Training School at Adrian, Michigan and eventually was the first woman to head a state institution in Michigan. She was also one of the first women who served as a practical penal administrator and, among several other prison reformers, advocated the “correctional principles of labor, education, and religion”.

== Biography ==
Born on February 28, 1837, in Raisin Township, Lenawee County, Michigan, Emma Amelia Hall was the daughter of school teacher Reuben Lord Hall and his wife Abby Wells Lee. Hall studied at the Lenawee County public schools and the Michigan State Normal School at Ypsilanti, Michigan.

After graduating in 1861, she began a career as a teacher in the Detroit public schools. In February 1867, Hall joined the Seminary for Young Ladies in Detroit, founded by John M. B. Sill.

Following Hall's involvements in union Sunday school movement, prison reformer Zebulon Brockway persuaded her to become a teacher at the Detroit House of Correction, an experimental reformatory facility established by the city of Detroit in 1861, where Brockway was serving as superintendent. In 1868, Brockway added a House of Shelter for women prisoners, a facility that was designed to combine workshop and school for the purpose of educating and rehabilitating women prisoners. In 1871 she became Matron of the House of Shelter and occupied the same position until 1874 when the facility was closed.

Hall also served as matron of the state school for defective and dependent children at Coldwater, Michigan, and the state school for blind, deaf and mute children at Flint, Michigan.

In 1879, the Michigan Legislature authorized a new reform school for girls. Subsequently, considering her experiences in the field, Charles Croswell, Governor of Michigan named Hall to the board of control of the reform school. As conceived by Hall, a facility named Michigan's Girls Training School was established at Adrian, where she served as superintendent between 1881 and 1884.

After resigning from the Michigan's Girls Training School in April 1884, Hall offered her services to the Presbyterian Church and expressed her interest to work as a teacher. In October 1884, she became a missionary teacher to the New Mexico Native Americans and stationed at Albuquerque, New Mexico.

She died on December 27, 1884, in Albuquerque, New Mexico Territory, of “heart disease”.
