= Amelia Butler =

American clown

- Born: Amelia Wells; 1833; Philadelphia, Pennsylvania, U.S.
- Died: May 14, 1869 (aged 35–36); New York or Little Rock, Arkansas, U.S.
- Other name: Columbine
- Occupation: Clown
- Spouse: Robert Butler Butcher

Amelia Butler (née Wells; 1833 – May 14, 1869) was an American clown best known for being the earliest recorded female circus clown in the United States.

== Biography ==
Not much information is known about Butler's life and career. She was born Amelia Wells to clown John Grimaldi Wells in Philadelphia, Pennsylvania in 1833. Her first stage experience was alongside her sisters, Mary Ann and Louisa, as "The Three Spirits". In 1854, she was working as a performer at the Chestnut Street Theatre, and was touring as an "equestrienne" with Kemp's Mammoth English Circus and J. M. Nixon's Great American Circus in 1858. Butler was additionally billed under the name "Columbine" at a circus in Philadelphia in 1863. She had a husband, Robert Butler Butcher, who also performed as a clown.

Butler died of malaria on May 14, 1869 in New York or Little Rock, Arkansas, and was buried in Philadelphia.
