= Anna Der-Vartanian =

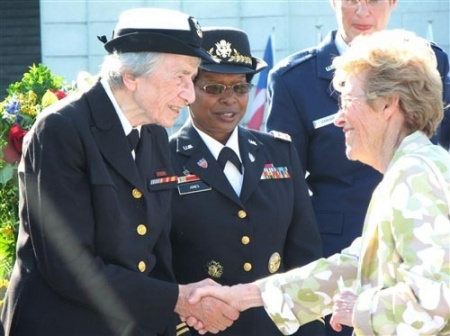
- Navy Master Chief Petty Officer Anna Der-Vartanian (left) shakes hands with Maj. Gen. Jeanne M. Holm, USAF (right), 2008
- Born: December 6, 1920
- Died: August 4, 2011 (aged 90)
- Burial place: Arlington National Cemetery
- Military career
- Allegiance: United States
- Branch: United States Navy
- Service years: 1943–1963
- Rate: Master chief petty officer

Anna Der-Vartanian (December 6, 1920 – August 4, 2011) was the first woman promoted to Master Chief Petty Officer (E-9), the highest enlisted rate in the United States Navy.

In 1959, while serving as assistant to the Global Strategy Officer at the Naval War College in Newport, Rhode Island, Der-Vartanian received her promotion to Master Chief Petty Officer. With that promotion, she made history as the first woman in the U.S. Armed Forces to be promoted to the paygrade of E-9.

Der-Vartanian died August 4, 2011, at the age of 90 and was buried with full military honors at Arlington National Cemetery.

== Early life ==
Der-Vartanian was born December 6, 1920. She was of Armenian descent. Raised in Detroit, Michigan, she attended Southwestern High School from 1936 to 1939. She attended Detroit Business University from 1941 to 1942. Shortly after the outbreak of World War II, at the time of Der-Vartanian's enlistment, her sister, Jeanne Oliver, was serving in the U.S. Navy while her brother, Andrew, served in the U.S. Army in the Pacific theater of war. Der-Vartanian's mother wanted to join the Navy, but opted to stay home and serve the American Red Cross.

== Navy career ==
After attending Detroit Business University, Der-Vartanian enlisted in the Army Women's Auxiliary Air Corps (WAAC), later called the Women's Army Corps (WAC), on December 18, 1942. She elected to leave the WAAC on August 31, 1943, joining the U.S. Navy as an Apprentice Seaman in the women's unit known as Women Accepted for Volunteer Emergency Service (WAVES).

After basic training, Der-Vartanian held an administrative position in Great Lakes, Illinois. She then served, from 1943 to 1946, at the Bureau of Naval Personnel in Washington, DC. Amongst new enlistees processed through her office were celebrities such as Robert Taylor, Gene Markey, and Eddie Albert.

Her next assignment was Naval Station Treasure Island in San Francisco, California, from August 1946 - June 1947. While there, she was promoted to the rate of E-7, Navy Chief Yeoman (YNC). By 1951, she was a writer for Deputy Chief of Naval Operations (Air), Vice Admiral Matthias B. Gardner.

Between March 1952 - December 1953, Chief Der-Vartanian was assigned to the Public Information Office (PIO) Pearl Harbor, then in the Territory of Hawaii. The office conducted tours to the USS Arizona Memorial, hosting notable visitors such as James Michener, Margaret Bourke-White, and John Wayne. In 1953, President Harry S. Truman passed through PIO Pearl Harbor and autographed a picture of himself for her, signing the photo with the inscription: "Glad to sign it. HST."

YNC Der-Vartanian's next assignment, from July 1954 - June 1956, was in the Personnel Office of the Parachute Rigger and Aerograph Schools at NAS Lakehurst in New Jersey. In 1957, she was promoted to the rate of E-8, Senior Chief Yeoman (YNCS), and transferred to the Public Information Office in Boston, Massachusetts.

In July 1959, she was detailed to the Global Strategy Office of the Naval War College in Newport, Rhode Island. There she met Admiral Samuel Eliot Morison and obtained his signature in her copy of his book, John Paul Jones. On December 16, 1959, while serving at the Naval War College, she was promoted again, making YNCM Der-Vartanian the first woman to reach E-9 in the history of the United States Armed Forces.

Following that promotion, she was transferred as the first female Chief Clerk in the Office of United States National Military Representative, SHAPE, in Paris, France. Her duties included coordination of administrative procedures for military personnel from the United States and the fourteen NATO nations within that command. She served in Paris until 1962, meeting President John F. Kennedy. She received a strong endorsement for the Navy's Limited Duty Officer Program, and, upon her departure from the command, a letter of commendation for her superior performance as the Chief Clerk.

Prior to her retirement from the Navy in July 1963, she worked at the Legal Office based at Naval Station Washington.

== Later life ==
Der-Vartanian joined the Central Intelligence Agency (CIA) in 1964 as a junior analyst, later becoming a counterintelligence specialist and received assignments in Paris, France; Bonn, Germany; and Madrid, Spain. Der-Vartanian was fluent in English, Armenian and French, and knew some Spanish and German. She officially traveled to Cairo, Egypt; Tunis, Tunisia; and Algiers, Algeria. Though retired from the CIA in 1991, she remained a contractor there until May 2007.

She resided in McLean, Virginia until the time of her death. She is buried at Arlington National Cemetery, Section 60, Site 9833.

== Awards and decorations ==
U.S. Military Decorations
Navy Good Conduct Medal (with 4 service stars)
American Campaign Medal
World War II Victory Medal
National Defense Service Medal
