= Deaths in March 1986 =

The following is a list of notable deaths in March 1986.

Entries for each day are listed alphabetically by surname. A typical entry lists information in the following sequence:

- Name, age, country of citizenship at birth, subsequent country of citizenship (if applicable), reason for notability, cause of death (if known), and reference.

== March 1986 ==
=== 1 ===
- Valentine Britten, 83, British librarian.
- Pierre Charton, 81, French racing cyclist.
- Rosario Couture, 80, Canadian NHL ice hockey player.
- Cahir Davitt, 91, Irish judge.
- Tommy Farr, 72, Welsh boxer.
- Gerhard Meidell Gerhardsen, 73, Norwegian economist.
- Charles Hahn, 92, German Olympic rower (1920).
- Ken Holley, 66, American football player.
- Marcel Liebman, 56, Belgian political scientist.
- William Modisane, 62, South African writer.
- Harvey H. Nininger, 99, American scientist in the study of meteorites.
- Samuel Roper, 90, American Klansman and law enforcement officer.
- Ernie Rosteck, 63, American NFL football player.
- Jens Stefenson, 91, Swedish naval officer and Olympic diver (1912).
- Katherine Amelia Towle, 87, American military director and academic administrator.
- Luigi Zucchini, 70, Italian Olympic ice hockey player (1936).

=== 2 ===
- Jocko Collins, 80, American NBA basketball referee and baseball scouting agent.
- Eileen Olive Deste, 77, New Zealand photographer.
- Hymie Ginsburg, 71, American NBL basketball player.
- Frank W. Hawthorne, 85, American judge.
- W. Stuart Helm, 77, American politician, member of the Pennsylvania House of Representatives (1957–1958, 1963–1964).
- Alice Mann, 86, American actress.
- Zafer al-Masri, 45–46, Palestinian politician, shot.
- William D. Mullins, 54, American politician, member of the Massachusetts House of Representatives (after 1977), cancer.
- Jacob P. Nathanson, 85, Russian-born American politician, member of the New York State Assembly (1927–1933).
- Cesare Polacco, 85, Italian actor.
- Edmund Port, 80, American judge.
- Jimmy Reynolds, 65, American baseball player.
- Margaret Trist, 71, Australian writer.

=== 3 ===
- Peter Capell, 73, German actor.
- Paul Castner, 89, American Major League baseball player (Chicago White Sox).
- Gordon Collins, 71, English cricketer.
- Winfield S. Cunningham, 86, American naval admiral.
- Léonard Daghelinckx, 85, Belgian Olympic cyclist (1920, 1924).
- Charles A. Halleck, 85, American politician, member of the U.S. House of Representatives (1935–1969).
- Ernst König, 77, German general.
- David Macindoe, 68, English cricketer.
- Dmitri Protopopov, 88, Soviet Tajik politician.
- Mohinder Singh Randhawa, 77, Indian historian and agriculturalist.

=== 4 ===
- Archibald Charles Barrington, 79, New Zealand peace activist.
- Ding Ling, 81, Chinese author.
- Hans Gillesberger, 76, Austrian choir director.
- Howard Greenfield, 49, American songwriter ("Love Will Keep Us Together", "(Is This the Way to) Amarillo", "Everybody's Somebody's Fool"), AIDS.
- František Hochmann, 81, Czechoslovak Olympic footballer (1924).
- Albert L. Lehninger, 69, American biochemist.
- Edward MacLysaght, 98, English-Irish genealogist.
- Richard Manuel, 42, Canadian musician (The Band), suicide by hanging.
- Leonid Meshkov, 70, Soviet Olympic swimmer (1952).
- George Owen, 84, Canadian-American NHL ice hockey player, stroke.
- Lyudmila Rudenko, 81, Soviet chess player.
- Elizabeth Smart, 72, Canadian writer.
- John Spence, 65, British politician, MP (since 1970).

=== 5 ===
- Necati Çelim, 76–77, Turkish politician.
- Franciska Clausen, 87, Danish painter.
- Grady W. Dalton, 77, American politician, member of the Virginia House of Delegates (1958-1971).
- Beatrice Centner Davidson, 76–77, Canadian architect.
- Emily Benton Frith, 91, American film producer.
- Teddy Hoad, 90, Barbadian cricketer.
- Andrew Love, 78, American baseball player.
- Sir Basil McFarland, 88, Northern Irish politician.
- George Nelson, 77, American industrial designer.
- Bernard Rowe, 81, English Olympic wrestler (1924, 1928).
- Veikko Ruotsalainen, 77, Finnish Olympic skier (1928).
- George Smith, 71, American NFL football player.
- Helmut Thielicke, 77, German theologian.
- Notable Nigerian soldiers executed by firing squad:
  - Daniel Bamidele, 36–37.
  - Musa Bityonɡ.
  - Mamman Jiya Vatsa, 45.

=== 6 ===
- Madhavrao Bagal, 90, Indian writer and social activist.
- Robert Bateson, 73, English RAF pilot.
- Jack Binder, 83, American comic book artist.
- Emilio de Brigard Ortiz, 97, Colombian Roman Catholic prelate.
- Eric Brown, 61, Scottish golfer, stroke.
- Adolph Caesar, 52, American actor (A Soldier's Story, The Color Purple), heart attack.
- Georgia O'Keeffe, 98, American painter.
- Orlando Paladino Orlandini, 81, Italian sculptor.
- Vahram Papazyan, 93, Ottoman-American Olympic runner (1912).
- Jerry Paulson, 50, American NBA basketball player (Cincinnati Royals).
- István Pelle, 78, Hungarian Olympic gymnast (1932).
- Max Shacklady, 67, English Olympic boxer (1948).
- Robert Early Strawbridge Jr., 89, American polo player.
- George Thornewell, 87, English footballer.
- Zhu Guangqian, 88, Chinese literary scholar.

=== 7 ===
- Emma Baron, 81, Italian actress.
- Olin G. Blackwell, 71, American prison warden (Alcatraz).
- Charles Catlow, 78, English cricketer.
- Wal Cherry, 53, Australian theatre director, heart disease.
- Giacomo Di Segni, 66, Italian Olympic boxer (1948, 1952).
- Robert Howland, 80, English Olympic shot putter (1928).
- Carmel Humphries, 76, Irish zoologist.
- Jacob Javits, 81, American politician, member of the U.S. House of Representatives (1947–1954) and Senate (1957–1981), amyotrophic lateral sclerosis.
- Henry Harrison Mayes, 88, American evangelist.
- Bert Metzger, 77, American football player (Notre Dame).
- Jimmy Moore, 82, American Major League baseball player.

=== 8 ===
- Victor Borghi, 73, Swiss Olympic skier (1948).
- T.H. Chan, 62–63, Hong Kong real estate entrepreneur.
- Hubert Fichte, 50, German novelist, AIDS.
- Kaarlo Halttunen, 76, Finnish actor.
- Hans Knecht, 72, Swiss racing cyclist.
- Moses Mabhida, 62, South African politician, heart attack.
- Kersti Merilaas, 72, Estonian poet.
- Jackie Morton, 71, English footballer.

=== 9 ===
- André Barbeau, 54, Canadian neurologist.
- Ned Calmer, 78, American journalist.
- Alex Chaplin, 94, Scottish footballer.
- James Crump, 87, American baseball player.
- Joseph-Léon Deslières, 92, Canadian politician.
- Victor Forget, 69, Canadian politician.
- Joe A. Griffiths, 75–76, Maltese footballer.
- Hannah Kudjoe, 67, Ghanaian political activist.
- John MacLean, 85, English cricketer.
- Ignác Molnár, 84, Hungarian footballer.
- Anthony Otter, 89, British Anglican prelate.
- Arthur Rude, 59, American politician, member of the Florida House of Representatives (1966–1976).
- Michael Strunge, 27, Danish poet, fall.

=== 10 ===
- Walter Blankenburg, 82, German hymnologist.
- Latham Castle, 86, American judge.
- Seydou Cissokho, 56, Senegalese politician.
- Myron Cohen, 83, Russian-born American comedian, heart attack.
- Fred Downer, 89, American baseball player.
- Heinz Emmerich, 78, German footballer.
- E. Gwyndaf Evans, 73, Welsh poet.
- Aram Haigaz, 85, Armenian-American writer.
- Magnus Colcord Heurlin, 90, American painter.
- George Horsburgh, 75, Scottish rugby player.
- Ruth Agatha Houghton, 76, American nurse.
- Yaakov Kamenetsky, 95, Russian-American rabbi.
- Franz Karasek, 61, Austrian politician.
- Dominica Legge, 80, British linguist.
- Reg Manning, 80, American cartoonist.
- Lew Mathe, 70, American bridge player.
- Ray Milland, 79, Welsh-American actor (The Lost Weekend, The Thief, The Jungle Princess), lung cancer.
- Elizabeth Monroe, 81, English historian.
- Emerson Norton, 85, American Olympic athlete (1924).

=== 11 ===
- Victor Ankarcrona, 89, Swedish Olympic equestrian (1924, 1928).
- Ari Ankorion, 77, Russian-Israeli politician.
- Pat Barlow, 71, Irish footballer.
- Mai Clifford, 72, Irish trade unionist.
- Georg-Peter Eder, 65, German flying ace.
- Henry Friendly, 82, American judge, suicide by drug overdose.
- Ricardo Frione, 75, Uruguayan footballer.
- Lurline Hook, 70–71, Australian diver.
- Sherman Kent, 82, American intelligence analyst and historian.
- Heinrich Lützenkirchen, 76, German politician.
- Giuseppe Moruzzi, 75, Italian neuroscientist.
- Herbert Runge, 73, German Olympic boxer (1936).
- Shwe Done Bi Aung, 80, Burmese filmmaker.
- Heinz Eberhard Strüning, 89, German painter.
- Sonny Terry, 74, American blues musician.
- Michel Van Vaerenbergh, 66, Belgian footballer.
- Onslow Whitford, 62, New Zealand cricketer.
- Václav Zavázal, 65, Czech Olympic sports shooter (1960).

=== 12 ===
- Ruth Abrams, 73–74, American painter.
- Percy Birtchnell, 75, British historian, heart attack.
- Richard Declerck, 86, Belgian politician.
- Fred Hancock, 67, American Major League baseball player.
- Claude L. Harrison, 99, Canadian politician.
- Bunker Hill, 44, American musician.
- Thure Johansson, 73, Swedish Olympic wrestler (1948).
- Nina Katzir, 71, Polish-Israeli socialite, first lady (1973–1978).
- James Maurice Scott, 79, British writer and explorer.
- Soedjono Hoemardani, 67, Indonesian general, internal bleeding.
- Frank W. Tomasello, 86, American judge.

=== 13 ===
- Jack Bruton, 82, English footballer.
- Howard W. Cameron, 70, American politician.
- Andy Chisick, 69, American football player.
- Robert Courrier, 90, French biologist.
- Álvaro Fayad, 39, Colombian guerrilla leader (19th of April Movement), shot.
- Jesse A. Fernández, 60, Cuban artist.
- Eugen Gerstenmaier, 79, German politician.
- Jack Harvey, 78, American politician.
- Alan Hector, 46, South African cricketer.
- Hồ Văn Nhựt, 80, Vietnamese physician.
- Reg Hopkinson, 69, Australian rugby league footballer.
- S. Kanapathipillai, 86, Sri Lankan writer.
- Josef Kuchař, 84, Czechoslovak Olympic footballer (1920).
- Angelo Litrico, 58, Italian fashion designer.
- Donald Manes, 52, American politician, suicide by stabbing.
- Felix Scheffler, 71, German soldier.
- Allene Talmey, 83, American journalist.
- Jack Warner, 82, American Major League baseball player.
- Walter Weidauer, 86, German politician.

=== 14 ===
- K. C. Abraham, 87, Indian politician.
- Harold Arlin, 90, American radio announcer and engineer.
- Ed Aspatore, 76, American NFL football player.
- Edith Atwater, 74, American actress, cancer.
- Bertrand Harris Bronson, 83, American academic.
- James Vincent Casey, 71, American Roman Catholic prelate.
- Kálmán Cseh von Szent-Katolna, 93, Hungarian Olympic equestrian (1928).
- John Fulton, Baron Fulton, 83, British academic administrator.
- Nilo Hovey, 79, American clarinetist and musicologist.
- Harald Leth, 87, Danish painter.
- Jose Roy, 81, Filipino politician.
- Kodardas Kalidas Shah, 77, Indian politician.
- Servaas Theron, 67, South African flying ace.
- Sir Huw Wheldon, 69, Welsh broadcaster, cancer.
- Audrey Williamson, 72, British writer.

=== 15 ===
- Raymond B. Allen, 83, American educator.
- Martin Cooper, 76, English musicologist.
- Raymond Philip Etteldorf, 74, American Roman Catholic prelate.
- Alexandru Giugaru, 88, Romanian actor.
- Hendrik Greyvenstein, 69, South African soldier.
- Reginald Langrish, 80, Scottish rugby union player.
- Walter Lenkeit, 85, German veterinarian.
- Lü Bing-Chuan, 56, Taiwanese musicologist.
- Rupert G. Miller, 53, American statistician, lymphoma.
- Miguel Darío Miranda y Gómez, 90, Mexican Roman Catholic cardinal.
- Bill Patton, 73, American Major League baseball player.
- Pandelis Prevelakis, 77, Greek writer.
- Ramón S. Sabat, 83–84, Cuban artist.
- Andrew J. Santaniello Jr., 59, American politician, member of the Connecticut Senate (since 1983).
- Sir Henry Skinner, 59, British barrister.

=== 16 ===
- Abdurrahman Baswedan, 77, Indonesian diplomat.
- Pat Carroll, 30, Irish hurler.
- Lalit Kumar Doley, 58, Indian politician.
- George Jackson, 64, British animator.
- Hans Kloss, 80, Austrian bank manager and lawyer.
- Jean Letourneau, 78, French politician.
- Sir John Nicholson, 3rd Baronet, 82, English surgeon.
- Mihal Prifti, 67, Albanian politician.
- Ouvry Lindfield Roberts, 87, British general.
- Morteza Haeri Yazdi, 69, Iranian Shia cleric.

=== 17 ===
- Edward Jordan Dimock, 96, American judge.
- John Bagot Glubb, 88, British general.
- Peter Lienhardt, 58, British anthropologist.
- Clarence D. Lester, 63, American fighter pilot.
- Janette Sebring Lowrey, 94, American author (The Poky Little Puppy).
- Dave McCormick, 42, American NFL football player.
- Heinz Nixdorf, 60, German computer engineer (Nixdorf Computer).
- Raimundo, 2nd Duke of Castel Duino, 79, Italian hereditary peer.
- James Shuler, 26, American boxer, traffic collision.
- Arne Sultan, 60, American filmmaker.
- Sir Eric St Johnston, 75, British constable.
- Igor Tselovalnikov, 42, Soviet Olympic cyclist (1968, 1972).
- David Dortch Warriner, 57, American judge, heart attack.
- Gerhard Weber, 76, German architect.
- Sir Maurice Yonge, 86, English zoologist.

=== 18 ===
- Ludvík Aškenazy, 65, Czechoslovak writer.
- Janina Brzostowska, 88, Polish writer.
- Rolf Daleng, 56, Norwegian dancer and choreographer.
- Helmut Jahn, 68, German footballer.
- Bernard Malamud, 71, American novelist (The Natural).
- Bob Polk, 71, American basketball coach.

=== 19 ===
- Elisabeth Barker, 75, English historian and journalist.
- Linden Cameron, 68, Australian soldier and politician.
- Henri Courtemanche, 69, Canadian politician.
- Jon Lormer, 79, American actor, cancer.
- Norman McEachern, 86, Irish Olympic runner (1924, 1928).
- Marius Sandberg, 89, Dutch footballer.
- Júlia Székely, 79, Hungarian writer.
- Niyom Thongchit, 76–77, Thai boxing coach.
- Robert Dorsey Watkins, 85, American judge.

=== 20 ===
- Antonio Carrillo Flores, 76, Mexican politician.
- Mauricio de la Serna, 83, Mexican filmmaker.
- John Joseph Dougherty, 78, American Roman Catholic prelate.
- Tom Gale, 73, Australian rules footballer.
- Perry B. Jackson, 90, American judge.
- Kenichi Konishi, 77, Japanese Olympic field hockey player (1932).
- Samson Kutateladze, 71, Soviet hydrodynamicist.

=== 21 ===
- Raymond Burke, 81, American clarinetist.
- Derek Farr, 74, English actor (The Dam Busters).
- Horst Fischer, 55, German trumpeter.
- Fred Kijek, 66, Canadian football player.
- Chris Koch, 58, South African rugby player.
- Medardo Lamberti, 95, Italian Olympic rower (1928).
- Toby Robins, 55, Canadian actress, breast cancer.

=== 22 ===
- Harriette Simpson Arnow, 77, American writer.
- John W. Bricker, 92, American politician, governor of Ohio (1939–1945), member of the U.S. Senate (1947–1959).
- Sydney Checkland, 69, Canadian-British economist.
- Olive Deering, 67, American actress, cancer.
- Mark Dinning, 52, American singer ("Teen Angel"), heart attack.
- Denys Gaith, 76, Syrian Greek Catholic prelate.
- Marit Halset, 73, Norwegian actress.
- Martin Harlinghausen, 84, German general.
- Howard Harris, 74, American comedy writer.
- Jimmy Jones, 73, British tennis player.
- Michele Sindona, 65, Italian banker, mobster and convicted felon, suicide by cyanide poisoning.
- Charles Starrett, 82, American actor, cancer.
- Hellmut Wolff, 79, German occultist.

=== 23 ===
- René Cornu, 56, French Olympic swimmer (1948).
- Sir Leo de Gale, 64, Grenadian politician, governor-general (1974–1978).
- Moshe Feinstein, 91, Russian-American rabbi.
- Étienne Mattler, 80, French footballer.
- Sir Walter Merton, 80, British RAF officer.
- Ruth L. Saw, 84, British philosopher.
- Lev Smirnov, 74, Soviet judge.
- Josephine B. Sneed, 86, American politician.
- Stanley Stephens, 73, Australian politician.
- Viola S. Wendt, 78, American poet.
- Anastasia Zuyeva, 89, Soviet actress.

=== 24 ===
- Teófilo Carvalho dos Santos, 79, Portuguese politician.
- Walter Colbath, 80, American Olympic diver (1928).
- Sarah Cunningham, 67, American actress.
- Anders Dahlgren, 60, Swedish politician.
- L. Harold DeWolf, 81, American theologian.
- Wesley Ferguson, 63–64, American botanist.
- Hank Grampp, 82, American Major League baseball player (Chicago Cubs).
- Loy W. Henderson, 93, American diplomat.
- Gordon Hocking, 66, Australian rules footballer.
- Edmond Leclère, 74, French Olympic basketball player (1936).
- Michael, Prince of Montenegro, 77, Montenegrin royal, head of the house of Petrović-Njegoš (after 1921).
- Dimitrije Najdanović, 88, Yugoslav theologian.
- Krzysztof Mikołaj Radziwiłł, 87, Polish politician.
- Ernest Rogez, 78, French Olympic water polo player (1928).
- Maurício Sirotsky Sobrinho, 60, Brazilian business executive and journalist, cardiac arrest.
- Joseph Zuken, 73, Canadian politician.

=== 25 ===
- Daisy Bacon, 87, American magazine publisher.
- Gloria Blondell, 70, American actress, cancer.
- Warren Bockwinkel, 74, American professional wrestler.
- George Cehanovsky, 93, Russian-American singer.
- George Grant, 83, American Major League baseball player.
- Eddie McAteer, 71, Northern Irish politician.
- Allan McHardy, 71, Australian rules footballer.
- Norayr Mnatsakanyan, 63, Soviet Armenian singer.
- Jean van Heijenoort, 73, French-Mexican mathematics historian.
- Saifuddin Zuhri, 66, Indonesian politician.

=== 26 ===
- Mel Bosser, 72, American Major League baseball player (Cincinnati Reds).
- Chen Yonggui, 71, Chinese politician, vice premier (1975–1980), lung cancer.
- Andrew Freeth, 73, British painter.
- Anthony T. Lucas, 74–75, Irish archaeologist.
- Tony Panaccion, 77, American NFL football player.
- Pedro Puente, 78, Peruvian Olympic sports shooter (1960, 1964).
- Bartlett Robinson, 73, American actor, cancer.

=== 27 ===
- Abdul Hai Arifi, 87–88, Pakistani Islamic scholar and pharmacologist.
- Cass Canfield, 88, American publisher.
- Dudley Cockle, 78, English cricketer.
- Sir Harold Harding, 86, British civil engineer.
- Masanosuke Ikeda, 88, Japanese politician, renal failure.
- Richard Geraint Rees, 78, British judge.
- Julian Roosevelt, 61, American Olympic sailor (1952), liver cancer.
- Constantin Stanciu, 78, Romanian footballer.
- Albert Tate Jr., 65, American judge.

=== 28 ===
- Abdul Hakeem Chowdhury, 61, Bangladeshi politician.
- Oliver E. Crockford, 92–93, Canadian politician.
- Howard Ford, 80, English Olympic athlete (1928).
- Virginia Gilmore, 66, American actress, chronic obstructive pulmonary disease.
- Norman Hilberry, 87, American physicist, influenza.
- Mahsum Korkmaz, 29–30, Turkish Kurd militant, shot.
- Olle Nordberg, 80, Swedish painter.
- Roberto Viñals, unknown, Mexican Olympic equestrian (1952).
- Gustav Weinkötz, 73, German Olympic high jumper (1936).

=== 29 ===
- Jessie Cross, 78, American Olympic runner (1928).
- Giuseppe Gorletti, 94, Italian Olympic wrestler (1920, 1924).
- Haane Manahi, 72, New Zealand soldier, VC recipient, traffic collision.
- William D. Murray, 77, American college athletics coach.
- Steere Noda, 93–94, American politician and lawyer.
- Harry Ritz, 78, American comedian, pneumonia.

=== 30 ===
- Helga Anders, 38, Austrian actress, heart failure.
- Herman A. Blumenthal, 69, American production designer.
- James Cagney, 86, American actor (Angels with Dirty Faces, Yankee Doodle Dandy, Love Me or Leave Me), heart attack.
- John Ciardi, 69, American poet and translator.
- Yasuko Endō, 17, Japanese singer, suicide by jumping.
- James L. Jones Sr., 73, American soldier.
- Robin Jones, 42, British Olympic figure skater (1960).
- Alan Missen, 60, Australian politician, heart attack.
- Jean Vigoureux, 78, French-American artist.
- Beatrice White, 83, British literary scholar.

=== 31 ===
- Richard Aldrich, 83, American theatre producer.
- Kees Bastiaans, 76, Dutch painter.
- Andrew Fekete, 31, British artist, respiratory failure.
- P. Gopalan, 79, Indian politician.
- Ray Greenwood, 88, American politician.
- O'Kelly Isley Jr., 48, American singer (The Isley Brothers), heart attack.
- Adam Kossowski, 80, Polish-British artist.
- Alan Lloyd, 43, American composer, AIDS.
- Jerry Paris, 60, American actor (The Dick Van Dyke Show) and television director (Happy Days), brain cancer.
