= Bregal Sagemount =

Private equity firm based in New York City

- Company type: Private
- Industry: Private Equity, Venture Capital
- Founded: 2012
- Founders: Gene Yoon, Daniel Kim, Phil Yates, Adam Fuller, Michael Kosty
- Headquarters: 200 Park Avenue; New York, NY, U.S
- Total assets: Over $5.5 billion
- Number of employees: 30+
- Website: www.sagemount.com

Bregal Sagemount is an American private equity firm based in New York City.

== History ==
Bregal Sagemount was founded in 2012 by former employees of Goldman Sachs and Great Hill Partners. Gene Yoon, the Managing Partner at Bregal Sagemount, was previously the head of Private Capital Investing at Goldman Sachs in New York.

The firm's first fund, Bregal Sagemount I, L.P., was a $500 million investment vehicle. A majority of the capital for this initial fund comes from Bregal Investments, the investment arm of Cofra Group, a Zug, Switzerland-based holding company formed by the Brenninkmeijer family following the founding of the first C&A store in Europe.

Bregal Sagemount announced Bregal Sagemount II, L.P., the firm's second fund, with $960 million of committed capital on February 7, 2017.

In March 2020, Bregal Sagemount completed the final closing for Bregal Sagemount Fund III at the Fund's hard cap of $1.5 billion, exceeding the target of $1.35 billion.

In October 2022, Bregal Sagemount announced the close of Bregal Sagemount Fund IV at a hard cap of $2.5 billion, 66% larger than Fund III. The Fund had a 100% Limited Partner participation rate and a 130% re-up rate by dollar value.

In April 2026, Bregal Sagemount hired Chirayu Rana from JP Morgan, who became internationally famous when named in the media as the plaintiff in the JP Morgan "Sex Slave" case, where he alleged that he had "reluctantly" been forced to engage in sexual activity with a manager.

== Investments ==
Bregal Sagemount invests in middle-market companies across a number of technology sectors, including software, tech-enabled business and consumer services, digital infrastructure, healthcare services and technology, financial technology, and specialty finance. The firm typically invests between $15 million and $400 million in growth-oriented companies with greater than $15 million in revenue.

As stated on the firm's website, Bregal Sagemount provides capital for situations including: funding organic growth, facilitating mergers and acquisitions, providing shareholder liquidity, and buyouts. The firm invests in both control and non-control (minority) transactions.
