= Contribution profit-based pricing =

Contribution profit–based pricing (German: Deckungsbeitrag) is a pricing strategy that focuses on maximizing the profit contribution generated by a product ignoring both gross margin percentages and total sales volume or Gross Merchandise Volume (GMV). The method determines the price that maximizes the difference between a product’s selling price and its variable costs known as the contribution profit per unit (cp) while accounting for the expected number of units sold at each price level.

A product’s total contribution to operating income is maximized when the selected price produces the highest value of:

Contribution Profit per unit (cp) × quantity sold = CP

== Theoretical basis ==
Contribution profit per unit (cp) is the difference between the price of a product and the sum of the variable costs of one unit of that product. Variable costs are all costs that will increase with greater unit sales of a product or decrease with fewer unit sales (as opposed to fixed costs, which are costs that will not change with sales level over an assumed possible range of sales levels). Examples of variable costs are raw materials, direct labor (if such costs vary with sales levels), and sales commissions. The contribution profit per unit (cp) of each product multiplied by units sold equals the contribution to profit from sales of that product (CP), and the total of Contributions to Profit from all a firm's products (Total CP) minus the firm's fixed costs equals the firm's operating income.

Therefore, using the simplified example of a single-product firm, a firm would maximize profit by determining the price that maximizes contribution to profit (i.e., contribution profit per unit (cp) multiplied by the number of units sold), since the fixed costs that will next be subtracted will, by definition, be a constant regardless of the number of units sold. Due to the relative differences in order size and the efforts that a retailer or distributor have to make, different industries have different typical distribution margins.

Assuming an inverse relationship between price and sales volume, as is the case for most products since a lower price will generally induce higher unit sales, the firm would assume likely unit sales levels at various price levels, calculate the contribution profit per unit (cp) for the product at each of those price levels, multiply the number of units by the corresponding contribution profit per unit (cp) at that price level and choose the highest Contribution to Profit (CP) to maximize profit.

== Relative contribution margin and Opportunity Cost ==
The relative contribution margin refers to the use of a production factor that is required for the generation of the contribution margin:

Relative Contribution (rCP) = Product's Contribution to Profit/Production factor

If there is a bottleneck for a production factor within a company, and this factor may be used to produce multiple products, the relative contribution margin can be used to calculate which product exploits the factor most efficiently and should therefore be produced. An example is the time used on a certain production machine. The relative contribution margin (also referred to as a bottleneck specific contribution margin), shows you the Opportunity Cost in the event that you decide not to produce the product.

== Use in retail: Rekenen in Centen, in Plaats van Procenten ==
At Amazon for example.

Selling Price − Buying Price Per Unit = Contribution Profit Per Unit (cp)

Contribution Profit Per Unit x Units Sold = Stock Keeping Unit's Contribution to Profit (CP)

Contributions to Profit From All SKU's − Firm's Operating Expenses = Total Firm Profit

The relative contribution profit, such as contribution per square meter (GMROS) indicates the Opportunity Costs in the event that one decides against the sale of a certain product on that selling area.

Using this system, the gross margin percentage and Gross Merchandise Volume (GMV) are considered irrelevant for merchandising decisions. In 1906, C&A, the clothing retailer owned by the Brenninkmeijer family, stopped trying to increase gross margin percentages. They fixed the margin at 25% for decades and increased relative contribution per piece in stock per time period. Later, when selling different commodities they shifted to relative contribution per square meter. They called this Dutch: Rekenen in Centen, in Plaats van Procenten, lit. 'calculating cash, not percentages'. Aldi used relative contribution profit based pricing per stock keeping unit from the very beginning in the 1950s.

== Limitations ==
This approach determines the price that maximizes profit only for an individual product, and only over a given time horizon. There are factors other than profit maximization for an individual product that a firm must consider in setting the price for each product, particularly if they have multiple products. These include:

- Impact on sales of other products of the firm (complementary sales; cannibalization; impact on brand image; impact on distribution or trade push of the firm's other products; competitor reaction affecting the firm's other products).
- The strategic role of the product and others in the product portfolio (price points and positioning of the other products; each product's role in the firm's cash flow).
- Plans to replace or modify the product (and hold distribution in the meantime).
- Economies of scale and scope, and experience curve effects on costs.
- Long-term strategy for the product.
