= Scorpion (company) =

American technology company

- Type: Private
- Industry: Marketing
- Founded: 2001
- Founder: Rustin Kretz
- Headquarters: Lehi, Utah
- Key people: Rustin Kretz (CEO); Jamie Adams (CRO); Dan Bedell (President of Enterprise); Matt Bentley (Chief Data Scientist); Michael Kline (President); Alexandra Taylor (CMO); Amy Lindholm (Chief Client & People Experience Officer); Kirby Oscar (SVP, Corporate Development)
- Products: Marketing and technology services
- Website: www.scorpion.co

Scorpion is an American technology company that provides marketing and technology services to small businesses. The company is known for using artificial intelligence to gain insights on how to expand a business. It is based in Lehi, Utah, U.S.

== History ==
Scorpion was founded in 2001 by Rustin Kretz. It is a U.S.-based technology and marketing services company that provides digital marketing, advertising, and technology solutions for businesses in the legal, healthcare, home services, and franchise industries.

Over the years, Scorpion has played its part in market research and surveys, with the latest survey initiative, “Consumer Search Trends,” launching in 2023. The newest edition, titled "2025 Law Firm Search Trends,” was released in September 2025 in partnership with independent market research firm Dynata. For the study, 3,000 U.S.-based adults were surveyed about their experiences with online search and the client intake process.

In 2024, Scorpion released “The Scorpion Pulse,” a research and insights report uncovering industry shifts and trends for legal and home services across consumer preferences, the rise of artificial intelligence, and the digital marketing landscape. In April 2021, Scorpion received $100 million in investment from Bregal Sagemount.

In February 2026, Scorpion released the 2026 State of Home Services Marketing Report. The survey covered 2,000 homeowners and nearly 1,000 home services business leaders. It found a gap between what homeowners expect and what businesses deliver.

In 2025, Scorpion launched a Customer Advisory Board program for home services and pest control clients. In June 2026, it extended the program to law firms and legal marketing professionals.

Scorpion was part of the Inc. 5000 List of America's Fastest-Growing Companies between 2011 and 2020.

== Businesses served ==
Home services

Electrical, HVAC, landscaping, pest control, plumbing, roofing

Legal

Bankruptcy, criminal defense, employment law, estate and probate, family law, general legal, immigration, personal injury

Other

Franchise, medical, platforms and multi-location, hospital and healthcare systems

== Acquisitions ==
In July 2017, Scorpion acquired a New York-based marketing firm named Driven Local.

In September 2021, Scorpion acquired a franchise marketing agency, Wheat Creative, and it was added into its franchise division. In November 2021, Scorpion made another acquisition and acquired a digital marketing company, MediaSmack, which is active in the legal industry. In the same year, the company acquired a software company, CanIRank.

In September 2024, Scorpion acquired Get Noticed Get Found (GNGF), a digital marketing agency specializing in services for law firms.

In June 2026, Scorpion acquired 1SEO Digital Agency, a digital marketing agency based in Philadelphia. 1SEO was founded in 2009. It serves businesses in the home services, health, and legal industries.

In October 2026, Scorpion acquired Coalmarch Marketing, a digital marketing agency based in Raleigh, North Carolina. Coalmarch was founded in 2004. It focuses on marketing for the pest control and lawn care industries.

== Partnerships ==
October 2014, Scorpion selected into the Google AdWords Premier Small and Medium Business (SMB) Partner program, a designation within Google's partner ecosystem that recognizes third-party companies with expertise in managing and optimizing Google Ads campaigns for small and medium‑sized businesses.

June 2023, Scorpion partners with Thumbtack to drive business growth for service professionals

January 2024, Scorpion and ServiceTitan announce a strategic partnership aimed at integrating Scorpion's digital marketing technology with ServiceTitan's field service management software to enhance lead generation and revenue attribution for home services businesses. As part of the agreement, Scorpion was named ServiceTitan's only preferred digital marketing partner for home services businesses.

June 2025, Scorpion and Clio announce a strategic partnership under which Scorpion became Clio's sole Preferred Marketing Partner and Clio became Scorpion's sole Preferred Software Partner for legal services firms, integrating Scorpion's artificial intelligence–based marketing platform with Clio's legal practice management software to provide law firms with greater visibility into the client acquisition process.

January 2026, Scorpion named a badged Marketing Technology Partner in TikTok's Marketing Partners Program, one of six companies to receive the designation. The program recognizes third-party technology providers with technical integrations that support advertising on TikTok.

Scorpion has been a supplier member of the International Franchise Association since 2015. In 2025, IFA named Scorpion its preferred vendor in the National and Local Digital Marketing Lead Generation category. In June 2026, Scorpion released the Franchise Marketing Playbook, a resource made available to IFA members.

In July 2026, Scorpion became a technology partner supporting advertising in ChatGPT. The partnership works with OpenAI. It lets Scorpion clients create, launch, and manage ChatGPT ad campaigns through Scorpion's existing platform.

== Technology ==
Scorpion employs artificial intelligence to assist businesses in improving their ad purchases, getting to know their clients better, and expanding.

Scorpion technology assists businesses in ranking in search engines, managing lead flow, and knowing in detail about cash flows, allowing them to make better decisions. They also provide an all-in-one dashboard where a company can view the results. Live chat, texting, and marketing automation is also available.

In October 2024, Scorpion launched RevenueMAX, an artificial intelligence–driven marketing platform that uses Scorpion AI to align marketing efforts, improve intake efficiency, and increase visibility into how marketing activities contribute to long-term business performance for law firms and home services companies.

In October 2025, Scorpion introduced Scorpion Convert, an artificial intelligence–based intake and conversion platform designed to help local businesses manage missed leads by automating responses, scheduling, and customer engagement through integrated voice and messaging assistants.

In August 2026, Scorpion expanded its advertising offering to include Google Demand Gen. The offering combines Demand Gen with Google's AI Max, Broad Match, and Smart Bidding tools. It is designed to help local businesses reach potential customers earlier in the buying process.

== Awards and recognition ==
Scorpion won the Data Integration Excellence Award at the 2026 Microsoft Advertising Partner Awards. The award recognizes partners that find new ways to use data to improve advertising performance.

Scorpion won the Lead Management Innovation Award in the 2026 MarTech Breakthrough Awards.

Scorpion Convert was named a winner of the 2026 BIG Innovation Awards.

Scorpion listed among the winners of the 2025 Global AI Awards.

Scorpion named a finalist for three Microsoft 2025 Partner Awards

Scorpion leads the 2025 Healthcare WebAwards with 10 Winning Client Websites

Scorpion's RevenueMAX wins 2025 BIG Innovation Award

Scorpion wins 2024 BIG Innovation Award For AI Chat Technology

== Operations and offices ==
Scorpion offices are located in Dallas, Texas; Valencia, California; Salt Lake City, Utah; Shreveport, Louisiana; and Henderson, Nevada.

In March 2021, Scorpion moved its head office to Utah from California.
