= Olle Nordberg =

Olle Nordberg may refer to:

- Olle Nordberg (golfer) (born 1967), Swedish golfer
- Olle Nordberg (painter) (1905–1986), Swedish painter
