= Barbara Kafka =

American food writer (1933–2018)

- Born: Barbara Joan Poses; August 2, 1933; New York City, U.S.
- Died: June 1, 2018 (aged 84); New York City, U.S.
- Education: Dalton School; Radcliffe College
- Occupations: Food columnist; cookbook author
- Spouse: Ernest Kafka
- Parent(s): Jack I. Poses; Lillian Shapiro Poses

Barbara Kafka (August 2, 1933 – June 1, 2018) was an American food columnist and cookbook author.

== Biography ==
Born Barbara Joan Poses in Manhattan, she was the only child of Lillian Shapiro Poses and Jack I. Poses. Her mother was the first woman to graduate from the New York University School of Law who worked for several New Deal agencies under FDR. Her father was one of the founders of Brandeis University, the founder and president of perfume manufacturer Parfums D’Orsay and the vice chair of the New York City Board of Higher Education.

Kafka attended Radcliffe College after graduating from the Dalton School. While at Radcliffe, she met Ernest Kafka, whom she married. When he went to medical school in St. Louis, she went with him and worked editing medical journals. When they returned to New York, she began working as an editor at Mademoiselle. It is because Leo Lerman suggested she write and the fact he networked with Allene Talmey of Vogue that she became a food writer.

Because of their love of art, the Kafka would spend the summer in Provincetown, Massachusetts which was called "Summer Center of Abstract Expressionism."

She died at her home in Manhattan due to complications from Parkinson's.

== Career ==
She has been described as a “sometimes pugnacious cookbook author.’. Despite never using a microwave until 1984, she championed their use. Her first book on the subject, The Microwave Gourmet was published in 1987. Other titles included The Opinionated Palate: Passions and Peeves on Eating and Food in 1992, in 1995 Roasting: A Simple Art and in 2011, The Intolerant Gourmet: Glorious Food Without Gluten & Lactose.

=== Awards and honors ===
The James Beard Foundation bestowed upon her the Cookbook Hall of Fame award as well as its Lifetime Achievement Award.
