= Tony Panaccion =

American football player (1908–1986)

Profile
- Position: Tackle

Personal information
- Born: September 11, 1908; Jenkintown, Pennsylvania
- Died: March 26, 1986 (aged 77); Bryn Mawr, Pennsylvania
- Listed height: 6 ft 1 in (1.85 m)
- Listed weight: 212 lb (96 kg)

Career information
- High school: Jenkintown (PA)
- College: Penn State

Career history
- Frankford Yellow Jackets (1930); Frankford Legion (1933)
- Stats at Pro Football Reference

Victor Samuel "Tony" Panaccion (September 11, 1908 – March 26, 1986) was an American football player.

Panaccion was born in 1908 in Jenkintown, Pennsylvania. He attended Jenkintown High School and Pennsylvania State University. He played college football for the Penn State Nittany Lions from 1926 to 1929. He won a spot in the starting lineup as a sophomore in 1927.

He played professional football in the National Football League (NFL) as a tackle for the Frankford Yellow Jackets in 1930. He appeared in four NFL games, three as a starter.

He served in the U.S. Navy during World War II with the rank of lieutenant. He died in 1986 at age 78 in Bryn Mawr Hospital.
