= Veronica Bulshefski =

Veronica M. Bulshefski
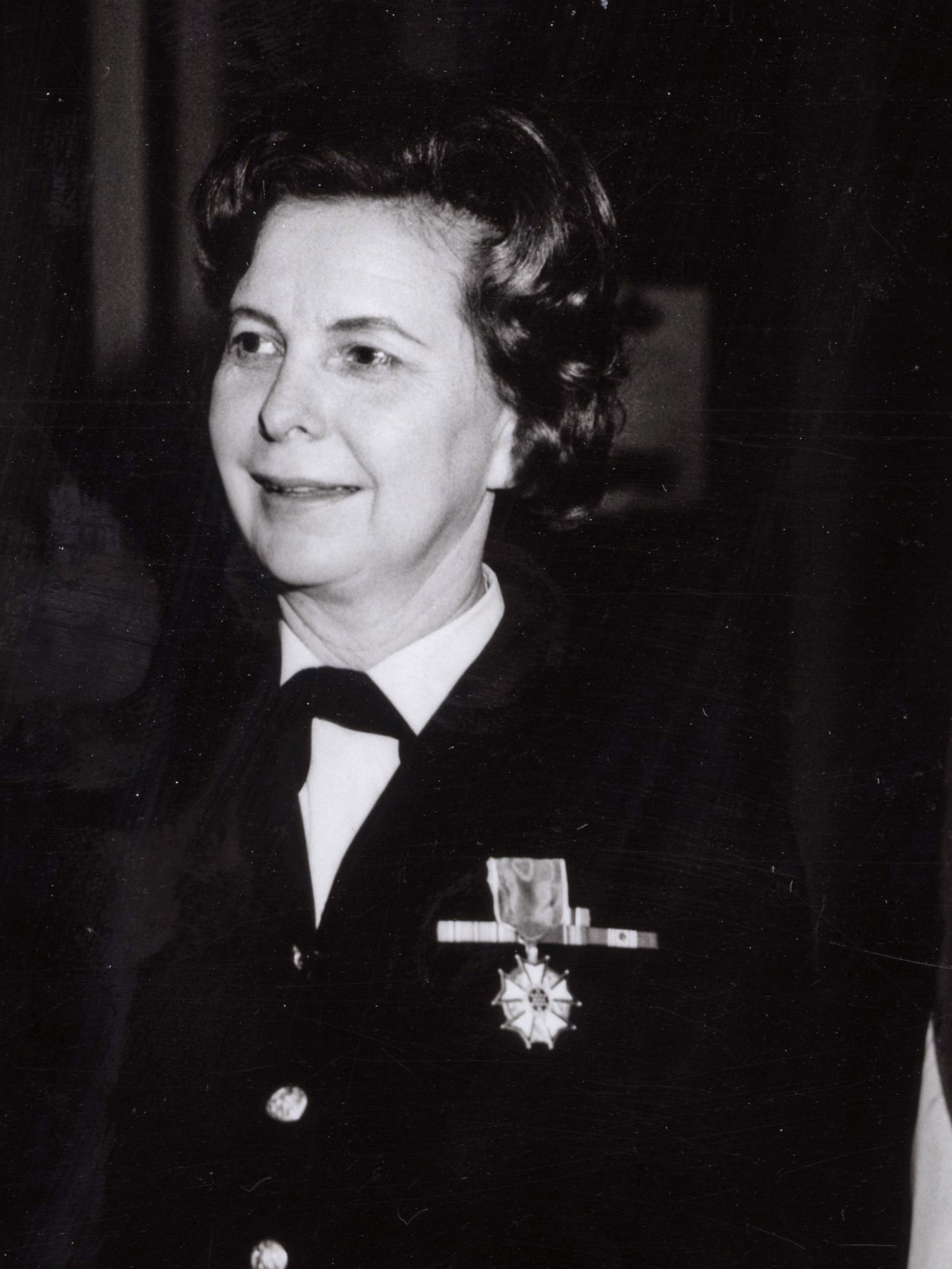
- Veronica M. Bulshefski at her Legion of Merit Award ceremony.
- Born: February 2, 1916
- Died: May 25, 1995 (aged 79)
- Allegiance: United States of America
- Branch: United States Navy
- Service years: 1940–1970
- Rank: Captain
- Commands: Director of the United States Navy Nurse Corps, 1966-1970
- Conflicts: World War II
- Awards: Legion of Merit; American Campaign Medal; Asiatic Pacific Campaign Medal; World War II Victory Medal

Captain Veronica M. Bulshefski (February 2, 1916 – May 25, 1995) was the Director of the United States Navy Nurse Corps, serving in that position from 20 April 1966 to 1 May 1970.

== Early life ==
Veronica Bulshefski was born on 2 February 1916 in Ashley, Pennsylvania. She graduated from University of Pennsylvania Hospital School of Nursing in 1937.

== Navy Nurse Corps career ==
Veronica Bulshefski joined the Navy Nurse Corps in 1940 at the urging of her dentist, a World War I veteran. During World War II she served in Hawaii at Pearl Harbor and Aiea Heights. She served as Chief Nurse at naval hospitals in Beaufort, South Carolina; Guam; Jacksonville, Florida; Pensacola, Florida and Oakland, California. She was selected for Captain in 1965 and on 29 April 1966 became the Director of the Navy Nurse Corps.

Captain Bulshefski retired from the U. S. Navy on 1 May 1970. She died on 25 May 1995 and was buried at Arlington National Cemetery on 6 June 1995 with full military honors.

== Education ==
Bulshefski earned a Bachelor of Science degree in Nursing Education from Indiana University in 1956 and a Master of Science in Management from the Naval Postgraduate School in 1962.

Preceded by Ruth Alice Erickson	Director, Navy Nurse Corps; 1966-1970	Succeeded by Alene B. Duerk
