= Frederick S. Boas =

English scholar of early modern drama

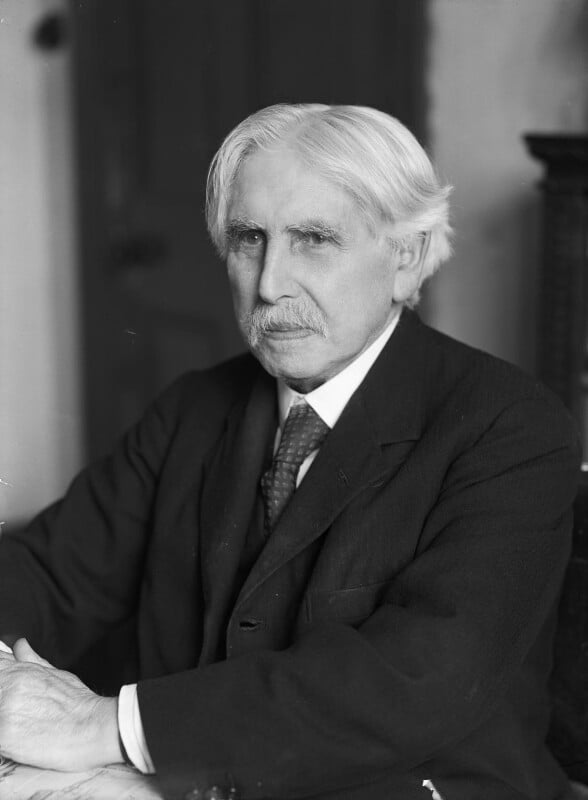
Boas in 1952

Frederick Samuel Boas, OBE FRSL (24 July 1862 – 1 September 1957) was an English scholar of early modern drama.

== Education ==
He was born on 24 July 1862, the eldest son of Hermann Boas of Belfast. His family was Jewish. He attended Clifton College as a scholar and went up to Balliol College, Oxford, in 1881. During his time at Balliol his tutor was (later Professor) David George Ritchie. He held college Open and Jenkyns Scholarships and took a First in Classical Moderations in 1882, followed by a 1st in Literae Humaniores in 1885 and a 1st in Modern History and BA in 1886, which last he converted to MA in 1888.

== Career ==
His subsequent career was: Oxford University Extension Lecturer 1887–1901; Professor of English Literature, Queen's College, Belfast, and Fellow of the Royal University of Ireland 1901–1905, Librarian 1903–1905; Clark Lecturer, Trinity College, Cambridge, 1904; Inspector of English, London County Council Education Department 1905–1927; First Honorary General Secretary of the English Association 1906–1909 and later President; Honorary LLD, University of St Andrews, 1909; President, Elizabethan Literature Society; Fellow and Professor of the Royal Society of Literature; Visiting Professor of English, Columbia University, 1934; Hon D. Litt., Belfast, 1935; broadcast talk 13 July 1939, on Benjamin Jowett, Master of Balliol; Shakespeare Lecture, British Academy, 1943; President, English Association, 1944; Vice-President, Royal Society of Literature, 1945. He was awarded the Royal Society of Literature Benson Medal in 1952 and an OBE in 1953. In 1952 he began an association with Beatrice White who joined him in creating the annual edition of "The Year's Work in English Studies" which is a bibliography published by the English Association. For four years she co-edited the annual work with him and for the next ten years she continued his project.

== Private life ==
In 1892 he married Henrietta O'Brien, daughter of S. J. Owen, Reader in Indian History at the University of Oxford; they had one son. Frederick Boas died on 1 September 1957.

== Works ==
- Shakespeare and His Predecessors (1896)
- The Tempest (1897) editor
- The Works of Thomas Kyd (1901) editor
- Giles and Phineas Fletcher, Poetical Works (1908) two volumes, editor
- Philaster or Love Lies A-Bleeding by Beaumont and Fletcher (1908) editor
- The taming of the shrew (1908) editor
- University Drama in the Tudor Age (1914)
- Songs of Ulster and Balliol (1917)
- Shakespeare and the Universities: And Other Studies in Elizabethan Drama (1923)
- The Year's Work in English Studies (1928) co-editor, and annually 1930–1950
- Marlowe And His Circle: A Biographical Survey (1929)
- Elizabethan and Other Essays by Sidney Lee (1929) editor
- An Introduction to the Reading of Shakespeare (1930)
- Six Plays by Contemporaries of Shakespeare (1932) editor
- The Tragical History of Doctor Faustus (1932) editor
- An Introduction to Tudor Drama (1933)
- Five Pre-Shakespearean Comedies (1934) editor
- The Diary of Thomas Crosfield (1935) editor
- From Richardson To Pinero: Some Innovators and Idealists (1936)
- Christopher Marlowe: A Biographical and Critical Study (1940)
- American Scenes, Tudor To Georgian, In The Literary Mirror (1944)
- Songs & Lyrics from the English Playbooks (1945) editor
- An Introduction to Stuart Drama (1946)
- Ovid and the Elizabethans (1947)
- Songs and Lyrics from the English Masques and Light Operas (1949) editor
- The Change of Crownes: A Tragi-Comedy by The Honourable Edward Howard (1949) editor
- Thomas Heywood (1950)
- Queen Elizabeth in Drama and Related Studies (1950)
- An Introduction to Eighteenth Century Drama 1700–1780 (1953)
- Sir Philip Sidney, Representative Elizabethan; his life and writings (1955)
