= Alene Duerk =

United States Navy admiral (1920–2018)

Alene B. Duerk
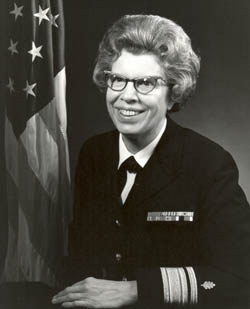
- Duerk, c. 1972
- Born: Alene Bertha Duerk; March 29, 1920; Defiance, Ohio, U.S.
- Died: July 21, 2018 (aged 98); Lake Mary, Florida, U.S.
- Military career
- Allegiance: United States of America
- Branch: United States Navy
- Service years: 1943–1946; 1951–1975
- Rank: Rear Admiral
- Commands: Director, Nurse Corps
- Conflicts: World War II
- Awards: Legion of Merit; Distinguished Alumni Award
- Other work: Director of United Services Life Insurance Company; Director of the Visiting Nurses Association and Foundation for Central Florida

Alene Bertha Duerk (March 29, 1920 – July 21, 2018) became the first female admiral in the U.S. Navy in 1972. She was also the director of the U.S. Navy Nurse Corps from 1970 to 1975. She is a 1974 recipient of a Distinguished Alumni Award of Case Western Reserve University's Frances Payne Bolton School of Nursing.

== Early life and education ==
Duerk was born in Defiance, Ohio, on March 29, 1920, to Albert and Emma Duerk. She had nursing training at Toledo Hospital School of Nursing, from which she received her diploma in 1941.

== Career ==
On January 23, 1943, she was appointed as an ensign in the Nurse Corps of the U.S. Naval Reserve. After receiving her commission in 1943, she was assigned in March of that year as a Ward Nurse at Naval Medical Center Portsmouth, Portsmouth, Virginia. In January 1944, she transferred, in a similar capacity, to the Naval Hospital, Bethesda, Maryland and in May 1945 joined the USS Benevolence That vessel, anchored off Eniwetok, received the sick and wounded brought back from Third Fleet operations against Japan and later joined the Third Fleet for its last strikes against the enemy. After the cessation of hostilities, that hospital ship remained in Japanese waters, off Yokosuka, to assist in the processing of liberated Allied prisoners of war. The Benevolence returned to the United States with wounded servicemen in late 1945. Assigned in January 1946 to the Naval Hospital, Great Lakes, Illinois, Duerk continued duty there until June of that year, when she was released from active naval service.

She attended the Frances Payne Bolton School of Nursing at Case Western Reserve University, Cleveland, Ohio, from which she received the degree of Bachelor of Science in Ward Management and Teaching, Medical and Surgical Nursing, in 1948. Employed as Supervisor and Instructor, Medical Nursing, at Highland Park (Michigan) General Hospital, she remained there until 1951. While there, she joined a ready naval reserve unit in Detroit, Michigan, in 1948.

Ordered to return to active naval service, she reported in June 1951, as a ward nurse at the Naval Hospital, Portsmouth, Virginia. Transferred in September 1951 to the Naval Hospital Corps School, Portsmouth, she was a Nursing Instructor there until October 1956, when she became Interservice Education Coordinator at the Naval Horpital, Philadelphia, Pennsylvania. From June 1958 to May 1961 she served as Nurse Programs Officer at the Naval Recruiting Station, Chicago, Illinois, after which she had duty as Charge Nurse at the U. S. Naval Station Hospital, Subic Bay, Republic of the Philippines. In April 1962 she was assigned as Assistant Chief Nurse at the U.S. Naval Hospital, Yokosuka, Japan.

During the period May 1963 to June 1965 she was the Senior Nurse Corps Officer at the Naval Station Dispensary, Long Beach, California. Following an assignment as Chief of the Nursing Branch at the Naval Hospital Corps School, San Diego, California, she reported in May 1966 as Assistant for Nurse Recruitment in the Office of the Deputy Assistant Secretary of Defense (Health and Medical), Washington, D. C. She remained there until May 1967, then had duty until February 1968 as Assistant Head of Medical Placement Liaison (Nurse Corps), Bureau of Naval Personnel, Navy Department. She next returned to the Naval Hospital, Great Lakes, where she became Director of the Navy Nurse Corps, Bureau of Medicine and Surgery, Navy Department.

Advancing progressively in rank, she attained that of captain on July 1, 1967. She became the first female admiral in the Navy in 1972.

Duerk retired in 1975. She died in Central Florida on July 21, 2018, at the age of 98.

== Awards and decorations ==
- Legion of Merit
- Naval Reserve Medal
- American Campaign Medal
- Asiatic-Pacific Campaign Medal with bronze star
- World War II Victory Medal
- Navy Occupation Service Medal, Asia Clasp
- National Defense Service Medal with bronze star

Duerk received the following honorary degrees:

- Doctor of Human Relations from Bowling Green University, 1973
- Doctor of Humanities from Marymount College of Arlington, Virginia, 1974
- Doctor of Science from Iowa Wesleyan College, 1975
- Doctor of Science from Medical College of Ohio, 1976.

== Tributes ==
In 2013 the University of Central Florida College of Nursing unveiled a bronze statue of Duerk, and it was put on display there. That university also offers the Rear Admiral Alene Duerk VNA Endowed Nursing Scholarship.

== Personal life and retirement ==
Having heard of her promotion to rear admiral on the radio in her car, a toll booth operator was the first person Duerk spoke to about it. But by the time she had gotten home, family was already calling and the press was waiting for her. From that time on, she felt that she was not only an admiral, she was a spokeswoman for all the women in the Navy. In that role, she frequently made appearances and statements in support of her Navy women, fighting for increases in pay, better conditions and recruiting nurses. Shortly after her promotion, she appeared on the game show To Tell the Truth

After retirement, she joined the board of the Visiting Nurse Association in the early 1990s, which later became the Visiting Nurse Foundation in 1997, serving on the board for nearly 25 years. The board established the Admiral Alene Duerk Endowed Scholarship Fund at University of Central Florida in her honor.

Although she was very close to her family, Duerk never married or had children of her own.

== See also ==
- Women in the United States Navy
- List of female United States military generals and flag officers

Military offices
Preceded by Veronica Bulshefski	Director, Navy Nurse Corps; 1970–1975	Succeeded by Maxine Conder
