= Ruth Alice Erickson =

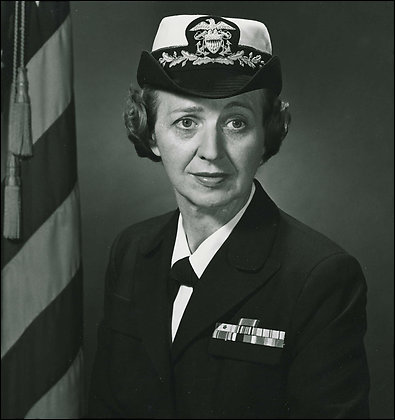
- CAPT Ruth Alice Erickson, USN
- Born: June 20, 1913; Virginia, Minnesota
- Died: November 25, 2008 (aged 95); Rochester, Minnesota
- Military career
- Allegiance: United States of America
- Branch: United States Navy
- Service years: 1936–1966
- Rank: Captain
- Commands: Director of the United States Navy Nurse Corps, 1962–1966
- Conflicts: World War II; Korean War
- Awards: Navy Unit Commendation, American Defense Service Medal with star, American Campaign Medal, Asiatic-Pacific Campaign Medal with battle star, World War II Victory Medal, Navy Occupation Service Medal, National Defense Service Medal with star

Captain Ruth Alice Erickson (1913-2008) was the Director of the United States Navy Nurse Corps, serving in that position from 1962 to 1966. As a lieutenant in the Navy Nurse Corps, she witnessed the Japanese attack on Pearl Harbor, Hawaii on 7 December 1941.

== Early life ==
Ruth Alice Erickson was born in 1913 in Virginia, Minnesota. She graduated from Methodist Kahler School of Nursing in Rochester, Minnesota in 1934.

== Navy Nurse Corps career ==
Ruth Erickson joined the Navy Nurse Corps in July 1936. During her career she served on the hospital ship Relief, witnessed the Japanese attack on Pearl Harbor, and served on the hospital ship Haven while bringing home prisoners of war from Japan in 1945. Erickson moved through positions of increasing responsibility, including nursing supervisor, senior nurse and assistant chief of nursing services at various naval hospitals, Nurse Corps representative in the 12th Naval District and Military Sea Transport Service in Seattle, WA, and personnel officer for the Nurse Corps at the Bureau of Medicine and Surgery in Washington, D. C. She served as chief nurse at three major naval hospitals and, on 30 April 1962 became the Director of the Navy Nurse Corps. She retired from the U. S. Navy on 1 May 1966.

== Education ==
Erickson earned a Bachelor of Science degree in Nursing Education from Indiana University in 1953.

== See also ==
- United States Navy Nurse Corps

Military offices
Preceded by Ruth Agatha Houghton	Director, Navy Nurse Corps; 1962–1966	Succeeded by Veronica Bulshefski
