= Heinrich Lützenkirchen =

Heinrich Lützenkirchen (29 November 1909 – 11 March 1986) was a German politician (Christian Democratic Union of Germany) and mayor of Leverkusen from 1961 to 1964 and in 1979.

== Life ==
Lützenkirchen was born in 1909 in a part of Leverkusen today called Bürrig. He became a member of the commission for school and habitation in 1947 where he supported the opinion of the Christian Democratic Union of Germany. In 1956 he became also a member of the city council of Leverkusen until 1974, when he became advocate of the district government of Bürrig.

He also was the subsidiary workers' council of Agfa Gevaert AG in Leverkusen for years. He died in Leverkusen in 1986.
