= Tom Gale (footballer) =

Australian rules footballer, born 1912

Personal information
- Full name: Tom Gale
- Born: 14 October 1912
- Died: 20 March 1986 (aged 73)
- Height: 183 cm (6 ft 0 in)
- Weight: 80 kg (176 lb)

Playing career^{1}
Years	Club	Games (Goals)
1937	St Kilda	3 (0)
- ^{1} Playing statistics correct to the end of 1937.

Tom Gale (14 October 1912 – 20 March 1986) was an Australian rules footballer who played with St Kilda in the Victorian Football League (VFL).
