= Walter Lenkeit =

German veterinarian

- Born: June 25, 1900; Bilderweitschen, Germany
- Died: March 15, 1986 (aged 85); Göttingen, Germany
- Education: University of Berlin
- Scientific career
- Fields: animal physiology,
- Workplaces: University of Göttingen
- Doctoral advisor: Ernst Mangold

Walter Lenkeit (25 June 1900 – 15 March 1986) was a German veterinarian. Lenkeit was professor at the University of Göttingen from 1936 till his retirement in 1970. His research was focused on Animal Nutrition.
