= Jimmy Reynolds (baseball) =

American baseball player

- Outfielder
- Born: December 3, 1920; Little Rock, Arkansas, U.S.
- Died: March 2, 1986 (aged 65); Little Rock, Arkansas, U.S.
- Threw: Right

Negro league baseball debut
- 1946, for the Birmingham Black Barons

Last appearance
- 1946, for the Birmingham Black Barons

Teams
- Birmingham Black Barons (1946)

James E. Reynolds (December 3, 1920 – March 2, 1986) was an American Negro league outfielder in the 1940s.

A native of Little Rock, Arkansas, Reynolds played for the Birmingham Black Barons in 1946. In five recorded games, he posted two hits in 15 plate appearances. Reynolds died in Little Rock in 1986 at age 65.
