= Beatrice White =

British literary scholar

- in 1986
- Born: 6 July 1902; Ely, Cambridgeshire
- Died: 30 March 1986 (aged 83); Eastbourne
- Occupation: Academic
- Spouse: no

Beatrice Mary Irene White (6 July 1902 – 30 March 1986) was a British literary scholar. She had a long association with Westfield College and the English Association.

== Life ==
White was born in Ely in 1902. In 1919 she started her studies at King's College, London and four years later she graduated with a first class honours degree in English. Three years after that she obtained her master's degree at King's with a thesis about the life and works of the English poet Alexander Barclay. White went on for an extra two years to create an edition of Barclay's "Eclogues" in 1928. She dedicated this book to Professor A. W. Reed who had supervised her master's degree.

She had spent nine years at King's, but she left when she was awarded a fellowship that enabled her to study in California. She visited both Stanford University and the Henry E. Huntington Library returning to England in 1931.

In 1936 she joined Queen Mary College where she was employed as a lecturer until 1939 teaching English. She spent the war lecturing at Queen Mary College and at the end in 1944-46 was leading the English Department as the acting head.

In 1952 she began a long association with "The Year's Work in English Studies", a bibliography published by the English Association. For four years she co-edited the annual work with Frederick S. Boas and then for the next ten years she was the sole editor until 1963.

In 1956 she went to Harvard University where she became the first woman to lecture the Medieval Academic of America.

Two years before she retired from Westfield in 1969 she was promoted to be a professor. Seven years later she was made an Honorary Fellow in 1976. She had become a trustee if the English Association in 1970.

== Death and legacy ==
White died at her home in Eastbourne in 1986.

The English Association awards an annual Beatrice White award, because she was loved and respected. The prize is give for the best work relating to the study of English Literature before 1590.
