= Emily Benton Frith =

American documentary film director

Emily Benton Frith (March 22, 1894 – March 5, 1986) was an American documentary film producer and cinematographer who is known for her educational films for children. Frith was born in Peoria, Illinois in 1894. She founded an independent film company called Frith Films in the 1930s and made over 60 films for pre-school and primary school aged children. The California-based company was sold in 1967. During the Korean war, one of Frith's films, Bill German: 12 Year Old Businessman, was designated by the US Department of Education's list of "102 Motion Pictures on Democracy." Many of Frith's films, such as Fire! Patty Learns What to Do, and What it Means to be an American, are available online through the Prelinger Archives. Frith's work was included in an exhibit called "Mental Hygiene: Social Guidance Films 1945-70" at the Museum of the Moving Image in 2000. Frith died in 1986 in The Dalles, Oregon.
