= Ruth Agatha Houghton =

American nurse (1909–1986)

- Born: June 29, 1909; Methuen, Massachusetts, U.S.
- Died: March 10, 1986 (aged 76) Portsmouth, Virginia, U.S.
- Allegiance: United States of America
- Branch: United States Navy
- Service years: 1935–1962
- Rank: Captain
- Commands: Director of the United States Navy Nurse Corps, 1958–1962
- Conflicts: World War II
- Awards: American Defense Service Medal with star American Campaign Medal; Asiatic–Pacific Campaign Medal; World War II Victory Medal; National Defense Service Medal

Captain Ruth Agatha Houghton (June 29, 1909 – March 10, 1986) was an American nurse who served as the director of the United States Navy Nurse Corps from 1958 to 1962.

== Early life ==
Houghton was born in June 1909, the daughter of Joseph J. and Mary Houghton Kelley.

In 1932, she graduated from St. John's Hospital School of Nursing in Lowell, Massachusetts.

== Navy Nurse Corps career ==
Houghton was commissioned as an ensign in the United States Navy Nurse Corps on June 1, 1935. During her years of service, her duty stations included the Panama Canal Zone, Australia, and New Guinea.

From 1935 to 1936, Houghton was assigned to Naval Hospital, New York, New York, then transferred to Naval Hospital, Newport, Rhode Island, where she was assigned from 1936 to 1942. Subsequent assignments included Naval Hospital, Coco Solo, Panama Canal Zone, Naval Hospital, Puget Sound, Naval Hospital, Corona, California.

During World War II, she filled the billet of chief nurse at the Naval Training School, Cedar Rapids, Iowa, and then, in July 1943 was assigned as chief nurse, Echo Base Hospital #10, Sydney, Australia and promoted to lieutenant commander. In August 1944, she took the job of chief nurse, Base Hospital #13, New Guinea. In 1945, she was assigned as nurse indoctrination instructor, Philadelphia Naval Hospital, then traveled to Klamath Falls, Oregon, and Portsmouth, New Hampshire.

In 1946, Houghton was assigned to Nursing Division, Bureau of Medicine and Surgery as a detail officer for the Nurse Corps. Houghton became the senior Nurse Corps officer, Navy Medical Unit, Tripler Army General Hospital in Hawaii in 1950. She subsequently served as chief nurse at San Diego Naval Hospital in 1952 and as chief nurse, Bethesda Naval Hospital in 1954. She became the first Navy nurse other than the director to be promoted to the rank of captain in 1957. In 1958, she assumed the role of director of the Navy Nurse Corps.

Houghton retired on May 1, 1962.

She attended George Washington University, Boston University, and the Catholic University of America. Houghton earned a bachelor of science degree in nursing education from Boston College in 1951. She later earned a Master of Science degree in nursing from The Catholic University of America, Washington, D. C.

Houghton married Gordon Bennett Tayloe in July 1963. She died in March 1986 in Portsmouth, Virginia, at the age of 76.

Preceded by Wilma Leona Jackson	Director, Navy Nurse Corps; 1958-1962	Succeeded by Ruth Alice Erickson
