= Allan McHardy =

Australian rules footballer, born 1914

Personal information
- Full name: Allan McHardy
- Born: 28 November 1914
- Died: 25 March 1986 (aged 71)

Playing career^{1}
| Years | Club | Games (Goals) |
| 1935 | Essendon | 1 (0) |
- ^{1} Playing statistics correct to the end of 1935.

Allan McHardy (28 November 1914 – 25 March 1986) was an Australian rules footballer who played for the Essendon Football Club in the Victorian Football League (VFL).
