= S. Kanapathipillai =

Sinnathamby Kanapathipillai
- Born: Sinnathamby Kanapathipillai; 27 June 1899; Jaffna, Sri Lanka
- Died: 13 March 1986 (aged 86); Thirunelveli, Jaffna District, Sri Lanka
- Known for: Tamil Scholar
- Title: Pandithamani

S. Kanapathipillai (27 June 1899 – 13 March 1986) was a minority Sri Lankan Tamil literary figure and Hindu revivalist in the school of Arumuga Navalar. His father was Sinnathamby Pillai of Madduvil in Chavakachcheri . Kanapathipillai was enrolled at the Navalar Kaaviya Paadasalai, under Kumaraswamy Pulavar, where he pursued higher studies in classical Tamil and literature. He was also guided by Swami Vipulananda, while still a student at the Navalar Kaaviya Paadasalai.

In 1925, he became one of only four people from Jaffna who had been bestowed the Pandithar qualification by the Madurai Tamil Sangam. Kanapathipillai was a trained teacher and was in charge of the Saiva Teachers Training School at Thirunelveli, Jaffna, from 1929 until he retired. He was also knowledgeable about Sanskrit, about Saiva Siddhanta and is a revered Tamil scholar of high repute and was given the title of "Pandithamani". In his last years he lived at his residence in "Kalasalai Veedi" in Thirunelveli, Jaffna. Panditamani S.Kanapathipillai had recorded his conversations with Mouna thava munivar-P.Kailasapathy of Alaveddi, Vice-Principal of Saiva-training College, Thirunelveli, Jaffna, from 1941.01.29 to 1957.03.19 in his very presence almost verbatim. The University of Jaffna had published them, in 1994, scrupulously edited by

Prof. S. Suchindraraja and A. Sabaratnam. The 700 pages of typed Tamil document will soon be published by the Department of Hindu-religious Affairs, Colombo.
