= Júlia Székely =

Hungarian writer and musician

Júlia Székely (Budapest, 8 May 1906 – 19 March 1986) was a Hungarian writer and musician.

She studied with the composer Béla Bartók, eventually becoming a pianist. She is also the author of biographies (especially of famous musicians), novels and dramas.

== Works ==
- A repülő egér (1939): novel
- A halhatatlan kedves (1961): biography of composer Ludwig van Beethoven
- Vándor Évek (1962): biography of composer Franz Liszt
- Elindultam szép hazámból (1965) : biography of Béla Bartók
- Schubertiáda (1968) : biography of composer Franz Schubert
- Chopin Párizsban (1969) : biography of composer Frédéric Chopin

== Sources ==
- Biographical note on the electronic Lexikon website: https://web.archive.org/web/20111005204636/http://www.netlexikon.hu/yrk/Ryrgenwm/14441 (hu)
