= Josef Kuchař =

Czech footballer

Personal information
- Date of birth: 2 April 1901
- Place of birth: Prague, Austria-Hungary
- Date of death: 13 March 1986 (aged 84)

International career
Years	Team	Apps	(Gls)
- Czechoslovakia

Josef Kuchař (2 April 1901 – 13 March 1986) was a Czech footballer. He played in one match for the Czechoslovakia national football team in 1924.
