= Jenkintown School District =

School district in Pennsylvania

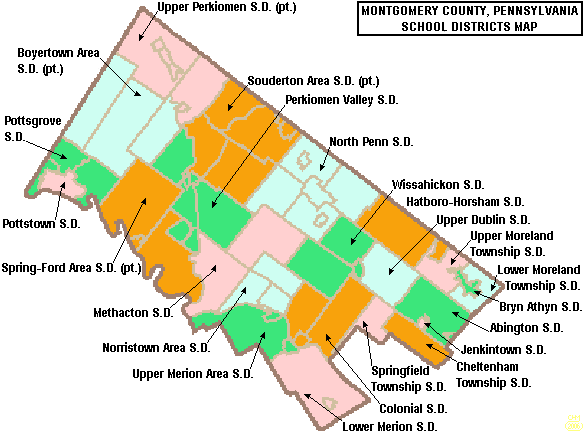

Address
- 325 Highland Avenue Jenkintown, Montgomery, Pennsylvania, 19046; United States

District information
- Type: Public
- Grades: K-12
- President: Dr. Megan O'Brien
- Superintendent: Dr. Jill A. Takacs
- NCES District ID: 4212420

Students and staff
- Students: 710
- Teachers: 58
- Staff: 34
- Student–teacher ratio: 12.2:1
- Colors

Other information
- Website: www.jenkintowndrakes.org

The Jenkintown School District is an American public school district that is located in Montgomery County, Pennsylvania. The school district serves the borough of Jenkintown, a suburb of roughly 4,700 people that is located three miles from Philadelphia.

According to 2017-21 ACS-ED data, the district serves a resident population of 4,681. The median household income is $120,172, versus a state median income of $67,587, and national median income of $69,021.

== Schools ==
The district features one elementary (K-6), and one middle/high school (7-12), both connected by a "link" and all on the same street. The public school is one of the smallest in Pennsylvania but usually has good scores.

Jenkintown is a very small district that is located in between the Abington and Cheltenham school districts. The link between the schools contains the administrator offices, community room, cafeteria, and band room.

== Color Day ==
The Jenkintown School District has an annual event known as Color Day on the Friday before Memorial Day. From 8:00 a.m. to 11:30 a.m., students participate in a small parade and then compete in events including tug-o-war (high school only), grade level events, and track. Whichever team (Reds or Blues) gets the most points at the end of the day wins Color Day. Every student is assigned to either Red or Blue team when they first enroll and keep that designation throughout their time at the school. Each year, two seniors, two eighth-graders, and two sixth-graders from each team are appointed Color Leader for that day.

== See also ==
- List of school districts in Pennsylvania
