= Luigi Zucchini =

Italian ice hockey player

- Born: 29 October 1915; West Springfield, Massachusetts, United States
- Died: 1 March 1986 (aged 70); West Springfield, Massachusetts, United States
- Position: Defence
- National team: Italy
- Playing career: 1935–1936

Lelio Vincenzo Zucchini (29 October 1915 – 1 March 1986) was an Italian ice hockey player. He competed in the men's tournament at the 1936 Winter Olympics.
