= Cofra Holding =

Swiss financial and real estate company

Cofra Holding AG
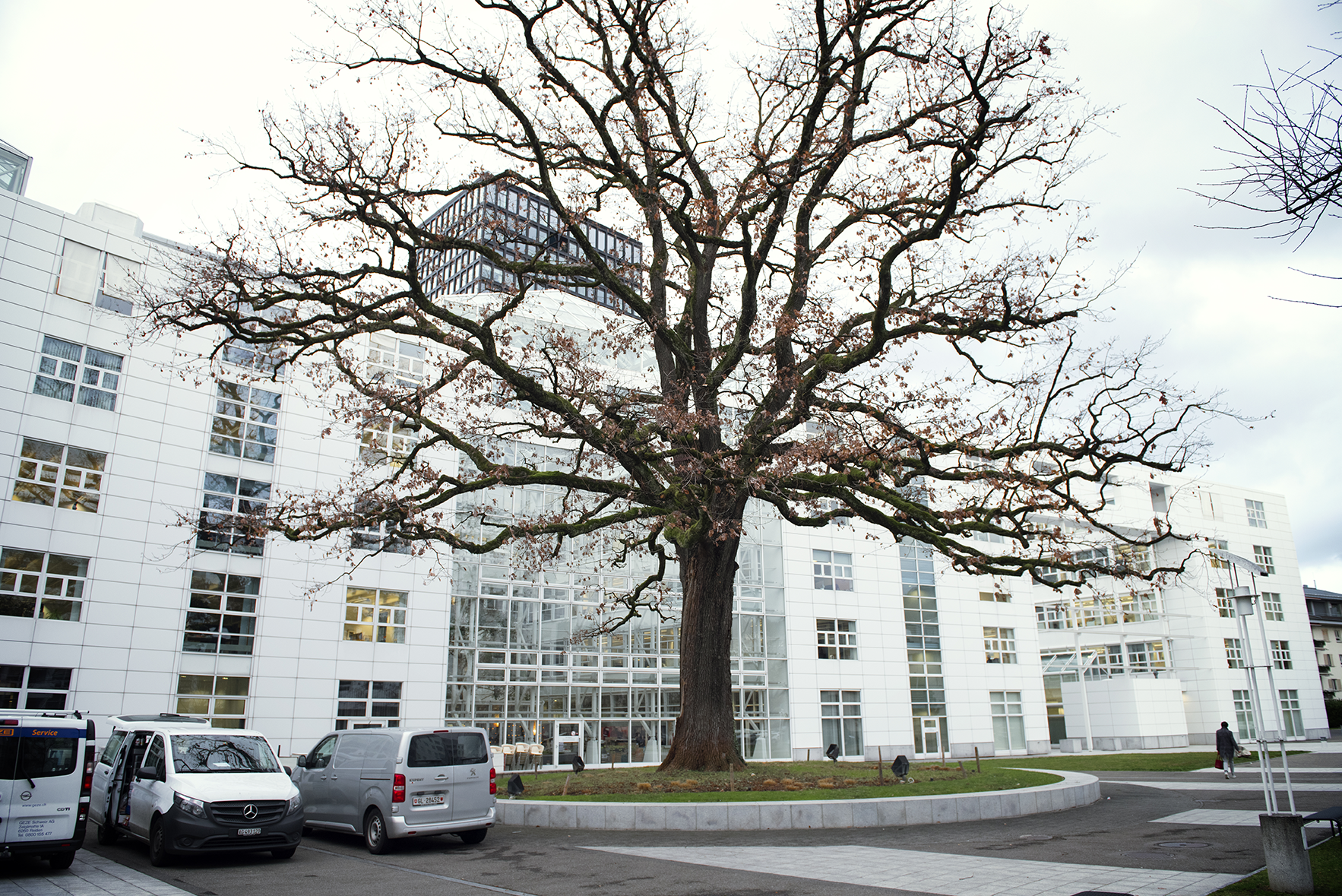
- Company type: Private (AG)
- Industry: Financial services; Private equity; Real estate; Retailing; Renewable energy; Sustainable food
- Founded: 2001; 25 years ago
- Headquarters: Zug, Switzerland
- Key people: Martijn Brenninkmeijer (chairman); Boudewijn Beerkens (CEO)
- Owner: Brenninkmeijer family
- Number of employees: 60,000 (2022)
- Website: cofraholding.com

Cofra Holding AG is a privately held company established in 2001 in Zug, Switzerland, to coordinate the global businesses of the Brenninkmeijer family. It is active in the fields of retailing, real estate, asset management, private equity, renewable energy and sustainable food. Cofra is owned and managed by members of the Brenninkmeijer family. Its chairman is Martijn Brenninkmeijer, and the CEO is Boudewijn Beerkens.

== Group structure ==
Cofra has various subsidiaries, including C&A, Redevco, Bregal Investments, Anthos Fund & Asset Management, Sunrock, Dalsem and Ontario Plants.

=== C&A ===
C&A, the fashion retail company, is the oldest business in the group. It was founded in 1841, when brothers Clemens and August Brenninkmeijer opened the first C&A store in Sneek, the Netherlands. As of 2024, C&A had around 1,300 stores in 17 European countries and employed over 27,000 people. It also has a presence in Brazil (since 1976). COFRA also owned and operated the C&A brand in Mexico and China between 1999-2023 and 2007-2020 respectively. In 2020, COFRA sold the brand and operations of C&A China to Beijing Zhongke Tongrong. In 2023, the brand and operations of C&A Mexico was sold to Grupo Alfar. In 2019, C&A Modas became a listed company in Brazil, trading on the BE Stock Exchange under the ticker CEAB3.

=== Redevco ===
Redevco, a European commercial retail and residential real estate business, was founded in 1999 and is based in Amsterdam, the Netherlands. Redevco's CEO is Neil Slater, who was appointed to the position in October 2023.

=== Bregal Investments ===
Bregal Investments, a private equity platform with various funds, was founded in 2002 to formalize the private investment activities of COFRA Holding AG. As of October 2024, Bregal Investments had AUM of €19 billion.

=== Anthos Fund & Asset Management (AFAM) ===
Anthos Fund & Asset Management (AFAM) was founded in 1929. It provides asset management services to the Brenninkmeijer family, their philanthropic foundations and the pension funds of various Cofra entities. AFAM's CEO is Jacco Maters, who was appointed in September 2018.

=== Sustainable food ===
In November 2021, Cofra announced an investment in Scotland-based vertical farmer Intelligent Growth Solutions as part of its Series B Funding round, which also included Cleveland Avenue LLC (Chicago) and DC Thomson (Dundee, Scotland) as investors.

In January 2022, Cofra took over the Dutch greenhouse manufacturer Dalsem. In April 2022, Cofra Holding announced the acquisition of Ontario Plants Propagation.

== Management and business practices ==
Cofra is a privately held company owned by a group of around 60 descendants of Clemens and August Brenninkmeijer. The group is also known as the “Sneekerkring”, a reference to the town of Sneek, where C&A was founded. Within the group of family owners, key decisions are taken on the basis of consensus rather than voting. Martijn Brenninkmeijer is the chairman of Cofra's executive board. In a 2016 Die Zeit interview with Maurice Brenninkmeijer, Götz Hamann and Uew Jean Heuser wrote that company shares cannot be inherited; they can only be obtained by family members who serve as Cofra executives.
