= Lü Bing-Chuan =

Taiwanese ethnomusicologist (1929–1986)

Lü Bing-Chuan (Sep 4, 1929 – March 15, 1986) was a Taiwanese ethnomusicologist; having earned a doctorate from The University of Tokyo, he was the first person from Taiwan to obtain such a degree in ethnomusicology. Lü was a prolific academic researcher widely considered a pivotal pioneer and founder in Taiwan’s ethnomusicologic study. While he is best known for his studies in Taiwanese indigenous music, his academic studies also include various musical and theatrical arts of the Han people. In 1977, the compilation album The Music of Aborigines in Taiwan Island and its analysis was awarded the top prize at the art festival held by the Ministry of Education, Culture, Sports, Science and Technology of Japan. Lü once served as a lecturer at numerous educational institutions including the National Taiwan Normal University and The Chinese University of Hong Kong. He was the first president of the Hong Kong Ethnomusicology Society and the first scholar to advocate Talent Education in Taiwan.

== Life and career ==
Lü Bing-Chuan was born in Penghu, Taiwan in 1929, two years before his family moved to Kaohsiung. While Lü discovered his passion for gliders, photography, music, and acoustics in his childhood, he chose to put his focus and effort into music. From 1943, he studied at the junior section of Kaohsiung Commercial High School for three years, under Japanese colonial rule, before studying at the senior section. After high school graduation, he worked at the Kaohsiung Harbor Bureau before transferring to Southeast Cement Corporation. From 1959 to 1962, Lü was the conductor of the Kaohsiung Symphony Orchestra before he stood down to study abroad.

== Education ==
In 1962, Lü went to Japan to study at Musashino Academia Musicae as a violin major. In 1966, he obtained a bachelor’s degree in music. Later on, influenced by Fumio Koizumi and Shigeo Kishibe, he became a music aesthetics major in the graduate program of Humanities and Sociology at The University of Tokyo. Also an ethnomusicology minor, he studied with Shigeo Kishibe and returned to Taiwan for his first field research. In 1971, he served as a research committee member of the music research center of the Department of Music at Tunghai University. Lü was awarded a Ph.D. in 1972 following the completion of his research article The Music of Aborigines in Taiwan Island – A Comparative Musicology Study. The lecturer jobs he had after coming back to Taiwan include an associate professor at the College of Chinese Culture, a music professor at the National Taiwan Academy of Arts and Shih Chien School of Home Economics (also the head of the department,) and a teacher of a music aesthetics course at National Taiwan University.

In 1980, he was hired by the College of Music Graduate Programs at National Taiwan Normal University as a professor; later that year he was also invited to lecture in the Department of Music at The Chinese University of Hong Kong, and after thinking thoroughly, he chose to head to the latter where he also served as the curator of Chinese Music Archive. in 1984, along with music scholars, musicians, composers, and music critics from The Chinese University of Hong Kong, The University of Hong Kong and Hong Kong Baptist University, including Yip Ming-Mei, Liu Jing-Zhi, Li Ming, Mao Yu-Kuan, Xiang Si-Hua, Tsang Yip-Fat, Leung Pui-Kam, Wu Gan-Bo, Lee Tak-Kwan, Zhou Fang-Fu, and Li Jian, he co-founded Hong Kong Ethnomusicology Society and was elected as its first president. In 1985, he went to The University of Edinburgh to lecture and do research. On March 15, 1986, he died from cardiovascular disease in Hong Kong at the age of 57.
