= Fred Downer =

American baseball player

- Outfielder
- Born: September 20, 1896; Royston, Georgia, U.S.
- Died: March 10, 1986 (aged 89); Chicago, Illinois, U.S.
- Batted: Right Threw: Left

Negro league baseball debut
- 1921, for the Pittsburgh Keystones

Last appearance
- 1923, for the Cleveland Tate Stars

Teams
- Pittsburgh Keystones (1921); Cleveland Tate Stars (1923)

Frederick Douglas Downer (September 20, 1896 – March 10, 1986) was an American Negro league outfielder and manager in the early 1920s.

A native of Royston, Georgia, Downer attended Morehouse College. In 1921, he played outfield and managed the Pittsburgh Keystones, and also played for the Cleveland Tate Stars in 1923. In 1953, Downer made news in Jet magazine for the warm greeting given him by Baseball Hall of Famer and fellow Royston native Ty Cobb upon their encounter at Wrigley Field. Downer died in Chicago, Illinois in 1986 at age 89.
