= Niyom Thongchit =

Thai fighter and boxer

- Born: Niyom Thongchit; 1906; Bangkok
- Died: 19 March 1986 (aged 77); Bangkok
- Native name: นิยม ทองชิตร
- Other names: Kru Niyom; Ajaan Niyom
- Style: Muay Thai; Muay Boran; Boxing
- Years active: 1960s

Other information
- Occupation: Boxing trainer
- Notable students: Pone Kingpetch
- Notable club: Kingpetch Boxing Gym

Niyom Thongchit (Thai: นิยม ทองชิตร; 1909 – March 19, 1986) was a Thai Muay Thai fighter, boxer, Muay Thai and boxing trainer, known from being trainer of Pone Kingpetch, the first Thai world champion.

== Early life ==
Thongchit was born in Bangkok graduated from Suankularb Wittayalai School, and shared classes with future the sixth Prime Minister of Thailand, M.R. Seni Pramoj. In 1921, he was appointed as "scoutmaster".

Since childhood, he was fond of all sports especially combat sports. Siam (Thailand in those days) in the early 20th century was a time when boxing was just beginning to be pioneered. The school has organized a boxing tournament at the student level. He also participated in the competition.

He became a champion of the Ministry of Religious Affairs (now Ministry of Education). His patron had him fight a famous Muay Boran (also known as Muay Kard Chuek) fighter Young Hantalay, which he able to win via TKO just the first round by grappling Hantalay's neck until he went to surrender. The result of that victory, therefore, the senior students who practiced judo turned to practice Muay Thai and boxing more, for example Tim Atipremanand, Jean Polajan, etc., many of them became famous fighters later.

Thongchit fought in Muay Boran style with a prison guard in Ayutthaya Prison named Kru Khan and was able to defeat him impressively. He earn a lot of fame and bounty, but he used these bounties to support the entire school's Scouting Affairs.

Later, he received a scholarship to study in England, where he practiced boxing seriously. He has been in amateur boxing on behalf of the club about 10 times, losing only three times. Upon graduation he served as a physical education teacher for boxing, judo, basketball at Suankularb Wittayalai School, Pathumkongka School, and Ban Somdet School (now Bansomdejchaopraya Rajabhat University).

In 1933, he was also the author of the jujitsu textbook, including boxing at a later time as well.

== Training career ==
In 1954, he resigned from teacher and co-founded Kingpetch boxing gym with a businessman Thongthot Intarathat (later Pone Kingpetch's manager) who owns a Devakam Apothecary Hall Company, at Soi Kingpetch (Soi Phetchaburi 10).

He trained Pone Kingpetch until became The Ring flyweight world champion by beating the veteran title holder Pascual Pérez from Argentina on April 16, 1960, at Lumpinee Stadium via 15th-round split decision. He was also a trainer for many contemporary boxers, such as Tai Kingpetch, Plian Kingpetch, Suphachai Sarakham, Sarika Yontarakit, etc.

For Pone Kingpetch, he built strength in his legs by giving him water skiing at Hua Hin, Kingpetch hometown.

He was respected by many people in the sport industry, Thongchit was often referred to with respect as "Kru Niyom" or "Ajaan Niyom" (master Niyom). While Kingpetch and his wife would call him "Khun Phor" (daddy).

Soon after Kingpetch lost the world title for the second period, he was disappointed with Kingpetch and Intarathat because of Kingpetch's addiction to alcohol, they splitting up.

== Death ==
At the end of life he thought of starting his own boxing gym but was unsuccessful due to a plaguing illness. He underwent multiple rib surgeries at Phramongkutklao Hospital.

Niyom Thongchit died of pulmonary edema on March 19, 1986, at the age of 77.
