= Reg Hopkinson =

Australian rugby league footballer

- Reg Hopkinson 1938

Personal information
- Full name: Herbert Reginald Hopkinson
- Born: 1917; Lithgow, New South Wales, Australia
- Died: 15 March 1986; Arncliffe, New South Wales, Australia

Playing information
- Position: Lock
Club
| Years | Team | Pld | T | G | FG | P |
|---|---|---|---|---|---|---|
| 1938–40 | St. George | 41 | 3 | 0 | 0 | 9 |

Herbert Reginald Hopkinson (1917-1986) was an Australian rugby league footballer who played in the 1930s and 1940s.

Hopkinson was graded by the St. George Dragons from President's Cup in 1936. He played first grade debut on 22 April 1938 at the Sydney Cricket Ground in the first match of the season verses Eastern Suburbs.

A fast and big lock-forward, Hopkinson held his first grade position until 1940, but he continued to play in the lower grades until 1944.

Hopkinson died at Arncliffe, New South Wales on 15 March 1986 (Age 69) and he was later cremated at Woronora Crematorium.
