= Valentine Britten =

British librarian

Valentine Mary Rachel Britten (14 February 1903 – 1 March 1986) was a British librarian who was the BBC's gramophone librarian, responsible for its library of recorded music.

== Life ==
Named after Saint Valentine, Britten was born in Fulham, London. She started with the BBC during the Second World War and worked there until her retirement on 13 December 1963. During that time, she was credited with enlarging the collection from 200,000 discs to half a million. She subsequently ran a guest house belonging and adjacent to Buckfast Abbey in Devon.

She appeared as a castaway on the BBC Radio programme Desert Island Discs on 17 September 1956.

She died in Brighton in 1986, aged 83.
