= Heinz Emmerich =

German footballer

Personal information
- Date of birth: 25 February 1908
- Date of death: 10 March 1986 (aged 78)
- Position: Defender

Senior career*
Years	Team	Apps	(Gls)
- Tennis Borussia Berlin

International career
1931	Germany	3	(0)
- * Club domestic league appearances and goals

Heinz Emmerich (25 February 1908 – 10 March 1986) was a German international footballer.
