= Brenninkmeijer family =

Dutch, German and Swiss family of manufacturers

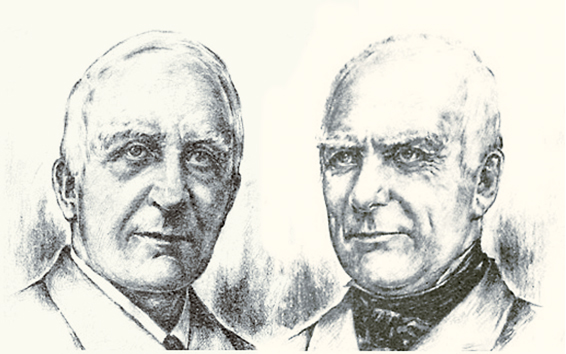
Clemens (1818–1902) and August (1819–1892) Brenninkmeijer

Brenninkmeijer (German: Brenninkmeyer) is a Roman Catholic Dutch, German and Swiss family of manufacturers, which owns an international chain of clothing stores and investment businesses. Originally the family came from Tecklenburger Land (Westphalia) in Germany, selling linen in Friesland in the Netherlands. In 1841, two members of the family founded C&A company in Sneek. Their descendants discovered the potential of the stock of produced ready-made garment. The family owns Cofra Holding AG, based in Switzerland. Through Cofra it owns and manages businesses in private equity (Bregal Investments), real estate (Redevco), asset management (Anthos Fund & Asset Management) and retail (C&A), which together manage more than €40 billion in assets. Since the 2010s, the family has begun opening these businesses to outside investors.

== History ==
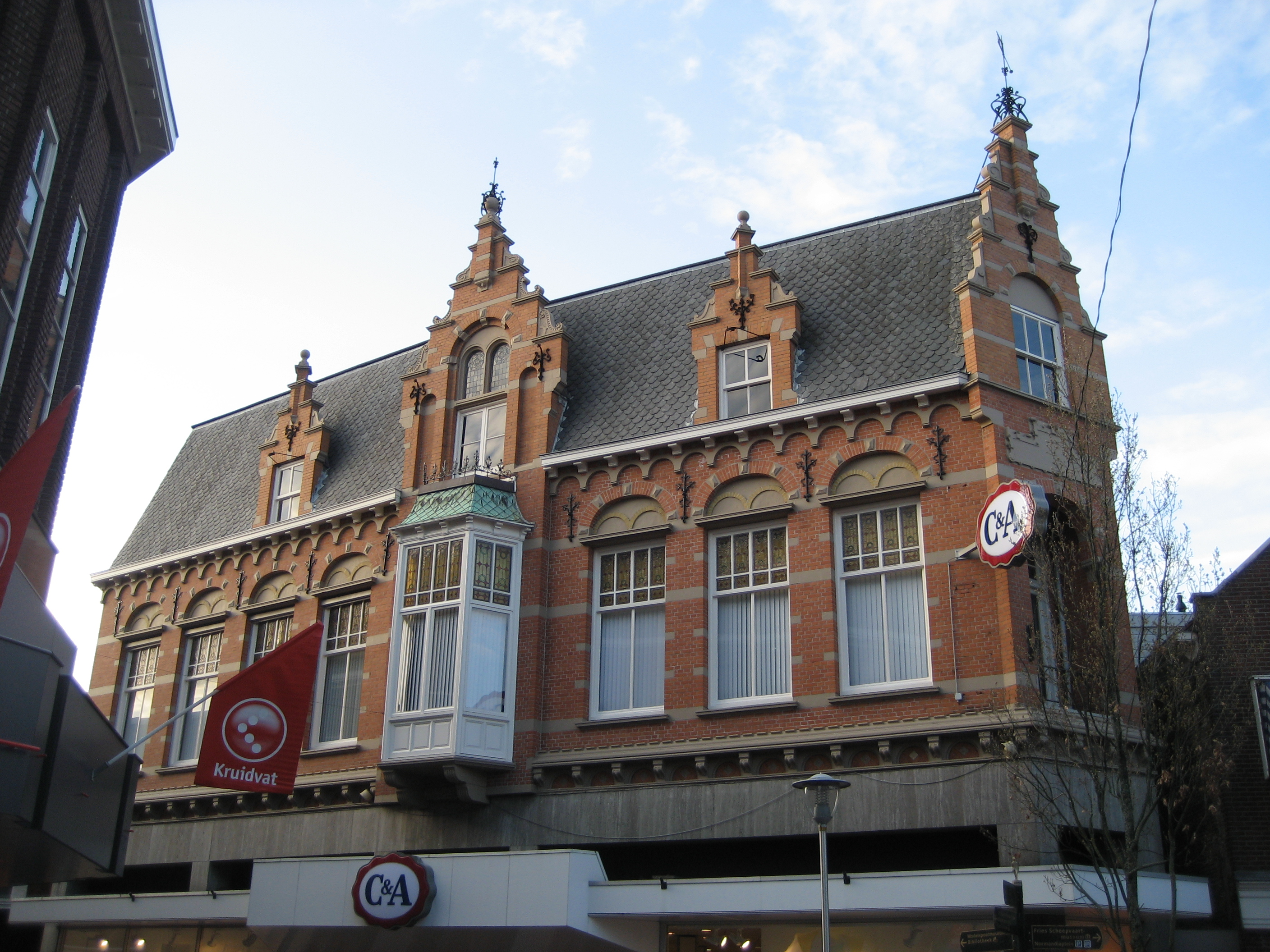
C&A-branch in Sneek; "Sneeker kring" (circle) is used to refer to the group of between 50 and 60 family members who own Cofra Holding; the exact number is not disclosed and changes over time.

=== 19th century ===
From the end of the 18th century, several Brenninkmeijers lived in Sneek, where Herman and his son Andreas founded a company. They were seasonal wandering merchants (peddlers), but forced by juridical restrictions to settle. Around 1835 they were assisted by their relatives Clemens and August from Mettingen (and surroundings). In 1841, Clemens and August founded a company (C&A) and stocked their goods in a warehouse, eliminating the need to travel. Around 1853 Clemens lived in Mettingen and August in Sneek, at a distance of 200 km to the NW. This small town in the north of the Netherlands became the location of their first shop in 1860; selling linen and cotton fabrics, sheets, bedding but also complete wedding suites. (Clothing manufacturers were the first sewing machine customers, and used them to produce the first ready-to-wear clothing.) In 1881 a branch was opened in Leeuwarden, and in 1893 and 1896 in Amsterdam; the possibility to buy on credit was abolished and the company started to sell menswear. In 1897, the family stopped peddling. Meanwhile, more relatives arrived from Mettingen as apprentices. A carefully designed rulebook ‘Unitas’ ensured that Brenninkmeijer sons and daughters enter the business in leadership positions at an early age, guaranteeing that the company was fully controlled by the family.

=== 20th century ===
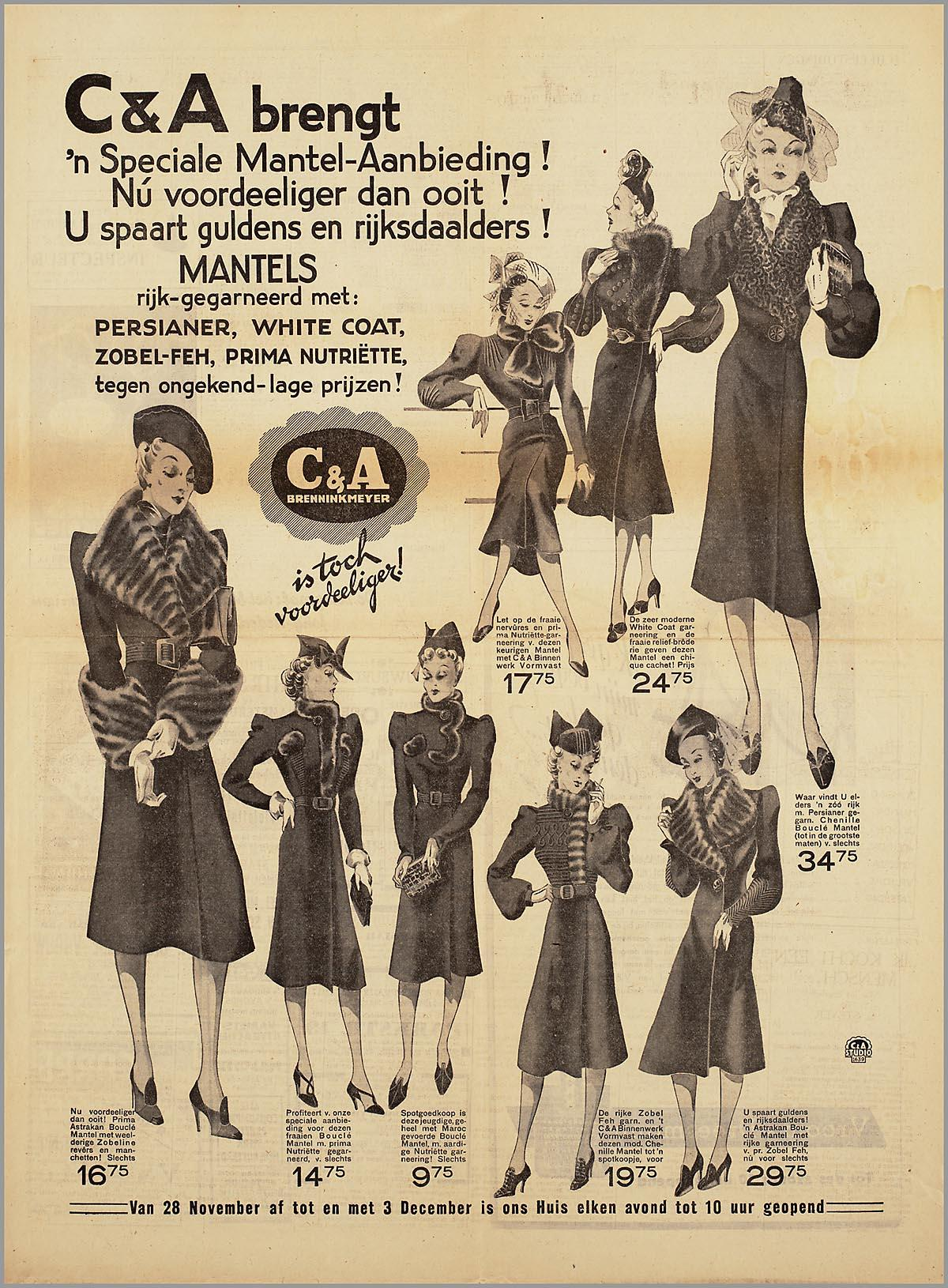
Advertisement C&A 1938 in Dutch newspaper De Telegraaf

Bernard Joseph Brenninkmeijer (Mettingen 1871 – Rome 1945), the youngest son of Clemens, is considered to be the father of the C&A formula. He started discounting in Amsterdam (Rekenen in Centen, in plaats van Procenten). In 1906 he repositioned the company which was the first step towards future years of exceptional successes. In his store in Amsterdam, he was one of the world's first discounters, introducing fixed prices. Instead of using a customary "keystone" gross margin of 50% he only asked for 25% or less. His insight: "you could cut your profit mark-up dramatically. Even with much a lower margin, the far greater volume of sales would still boost the bottom line profit. This major innovation has had a great impact on people's thinking within all C&A companies even to this very day."

By 1910, there were ten stores in the Netherlands, also in Groningen and Rotterdam. In 1911, the company opened the first German store in Berlin, managed by Clemens (1862–1938). In 1922, the company started a store in Oxford Street. During WWII the company profited from (expropriated) Jewish real estate and Ostarbeiter; after the war from the economic boom. The first store in the USA was opened in 1948. In 1967, C&A cooperated with Twiggy as designer; shops were opened in Belgium. In the 1970s the expansion of C&A went on: also Switzerland, France, Spain and Japan were added as markets. In 1981, Yves Saint Laurent and Karl Lagerfeld worked for C&A. In the 1990s, the company opened shops in Portugal and Mexico.

According to NRC Handelsblad, the family also financed the establishment of the CDA and the Pope's arrival in the Netherlands in 1985. The Brenninkmeijers have meanwhile donated more than a billion euros to the Catholic Church. Since 1995, the Brenninkmeijers' philanthropic activities have been managed more centrally via Porticus. Until the mid-nineties only male descendants in a direct line of Clemens and August Brenninkmeijer could become shareholders.

=== 21st century ===
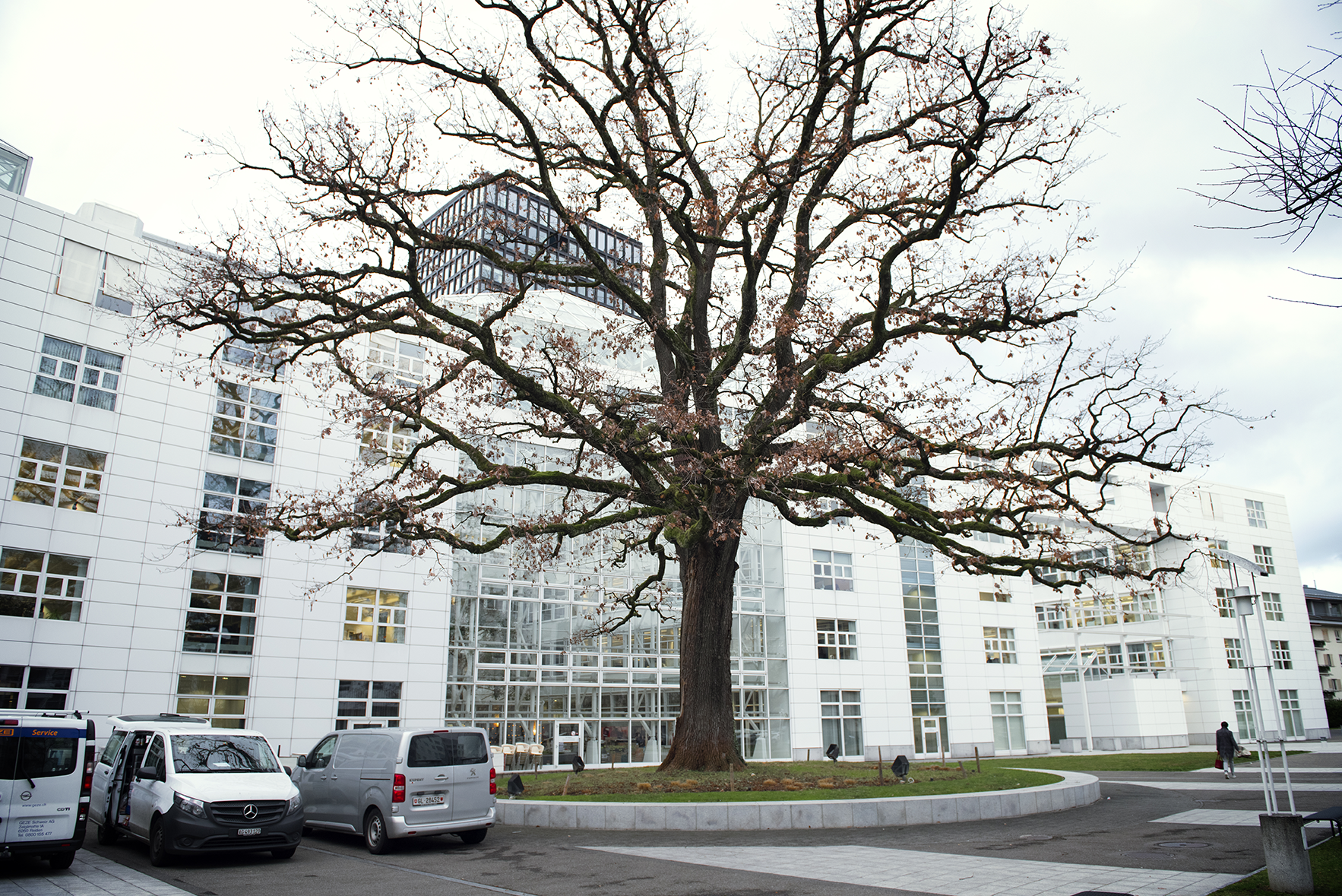
Cofra Holding in Zug, 2019

C&A is an apparel company with headquarters in Düsseldorf. As of 2024, it operated more than 1,300 stores across Europe. These companies are linked through Cofra, based in Zug, a tax haven in Switzerland. The company closed its stores in the United Kingdom and Denmark in 2000. In the 21st century many new stores have been opened in Eastern European countries. The company has also opened stores in China (2007). C&A-Online launched in Germany in 2008.

For a period of time Eastern Mountain Sports, Steinbach, Ohrbach's, Maurices, Miller's Outpost and others were owned through the American Retail Group. In the 1980s and 1990s, they owned the Comark group in Canada, which included Bretton's department stores, Clark Shoes and Collacut luggage stores. The Canadian operations were sold in 2005 to KarpReilly, LLC of Greenwich, Connecticut.

In 2009, the Brenninkmeijer family founded the Draiflessen Collection in Mettingen. In 2016, Kai Bosecker published his "Family Businesses as a Phenomenon: Insights" that the family had commissioned into the role of C&A during the Nazi regime. Mark Spoerer published "C&A: A Family Business in Germany, the Netherlands and the United Kingdom 1911-1961" in 2016; the book appeared in English, German, and Dutch.

In 2011, Jean-Louis Brenninkmeijer founded Little Canada. A Toronto-based organization constructing a miniature model of Canada.

In 2015, Bregal Partners, an arm of Cofra Holding, began investing in the fishing industry of the United States. The firm owns a stake in Seattle-based American Seafoods. It also acquired Blue Harvest Fisheries in New Bedford, Massachusetts, at the time the largest groundfish permit holder in New England; the company filed for bankruptcy in 2023 and is no longer part of the Bregal portfolio.

In 2017, Alain Caparros succeeded Philippe Brenninkmeijer as CEO of C&A Europe; he was the first non-family member at the helm of the company. In 2019, the CEO Post for C&A Europe was held by Edward Brenninkmeijer; in 2021, by Giny Boer, the first woman at the top. Meanwhile C&A sold its Mexico and China businesses to local investors. In July 2024, Boer stepped down and Edward Brenninkmeijer was appointed interim CEO while a permanent successor was sought.

In November 2024, Charlotte Brenninkmeijer was appointed CEO of Porticus, the family's philanthropic foundation.

In April 2025, Bloomberg reported that the Brenninkmeijer family had been opening up their investment businesses to external investors since the mid-2010s.

== Investments and fortune ==
In addition to textile retailer C&A, the Brenninkmeijers own and control several businesses through Cofra Holding, including Bregal Investments (private equity), Redevco (real estate) and Anthos Fund & Asset Management (asset management). Cofra's businesses manage more than €40 billion of assets, comprising both family and external client capital.

Anthos Fund & Asset Management has expanded its services to include external clients such as pension funds, foundations, family offices, and faith-based organizations. The expansion aimed to align with investment approaches centered on responsible and impact investing.

As of 2017, the family supported philanthropic causes through at least 58 foundations around the world.

Businesses held through Cofra Holding AG (selection)
Company	Sector	Notes
C&A	Retail	More than 1,300 stores in 17 European countries; over 27,000 employees (2024)
Redevco	Real estate	Pan-European real estate investment manager, established 1999; gradually opened to external investors (families and institutional investors) since the mid-2010s
Bregal Investments	Private equity	Opened to external investors in 2016
Anthos Fund & Asset Management	Asset management	Amsterdam-based; opened to external clients in 2022

== Notable members ==
The family has about 12 branches and 500 members. Albert Brenninkmeijer (born 1974), married Princess Carolina of Bourbon-Parma, a cousin of King Willem-Alexander of the Netherlands, on 21 April 2012 in Wijk bij Duurstede.

From 1988 to 2011, Mother Theresa Brenninkmeijer was the prioress, later abbess, of a convent in Sostrup Castle (Denmark).

Two family members have entered the entertainment industry, producer Stephan Brenninkmeijer and actor Philippe Brenninkmeyer.
