= Angelo Litrico =

Italian fashion designer

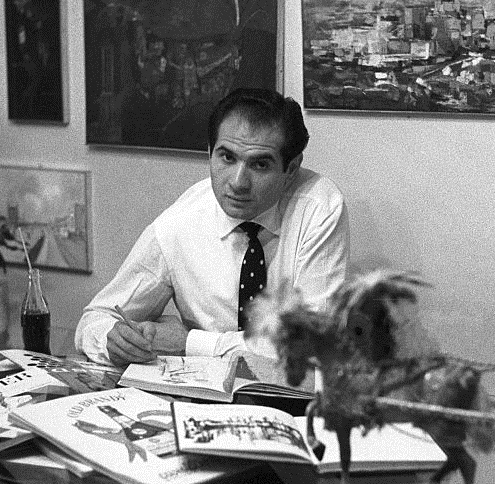
- Litrico at his desk in October 1957
- Born: 15 August 1927; Catania, Sicily
- Died: 13 March 1986 (aged 58); Rome
- Occupation: Fashion designer
- Known for: Tailor to the Cold War
- Label: Sartoria Litrico of Rome

Sartoria Litrico
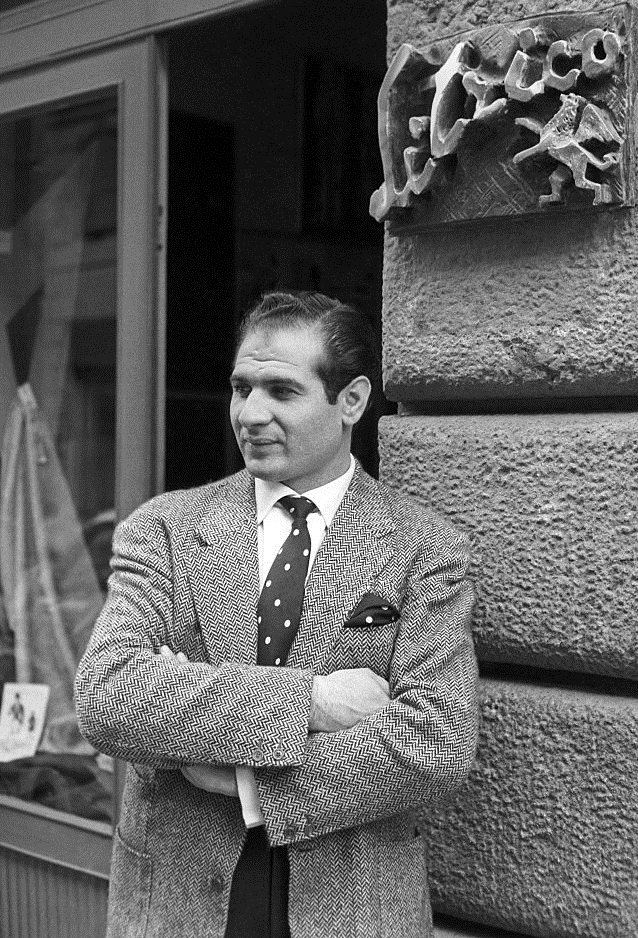
- Litrico at his company in October 1957
- Type: Private
- Industry: Fashion
- Founded: 1951; 75 years ago
- Founder: Angelo Litrico
- Headquarters: Rome, Italy
- Products: Menswear
- Services: Bespoke Tailoring
- Website: www.sartorialitrico.it

Angelo Litrico (15 August 1927 – 13 March 1986) was an Italian fashion designer. He dressed many world leaders on both sides of the Cold War and is credited with introducing fashion shows for men's clothing. The company he founded continues to this day under the control of his nephew Luca Litrico.

== Biography ==
Angelo was born in 1927, the eldest of 12 children, the son of a fisherman in Catania in Sicily. He started work with a tailor (Agatino Distefano, of Distefano's Atelier in Via Etnea, Catania) but realised that to fulfil his ambitions he would have to move to Rome, which he did in 1952. Walking down Via Sicilia, he saw a tailor's workshop and asked for a job, which he was given. His success was ensured by a silk jacket he wore to the opera that was noticed by Rossano Brazzi, the actor best known for Three Coins in the Fountain. With Brazzi as his first client, Litrico's fame spread and eventually he bought the shop where he had started as an apprentice. One of his innovations was putting on a men's fashion show, previously only women's wear had been shown on a catwalk.

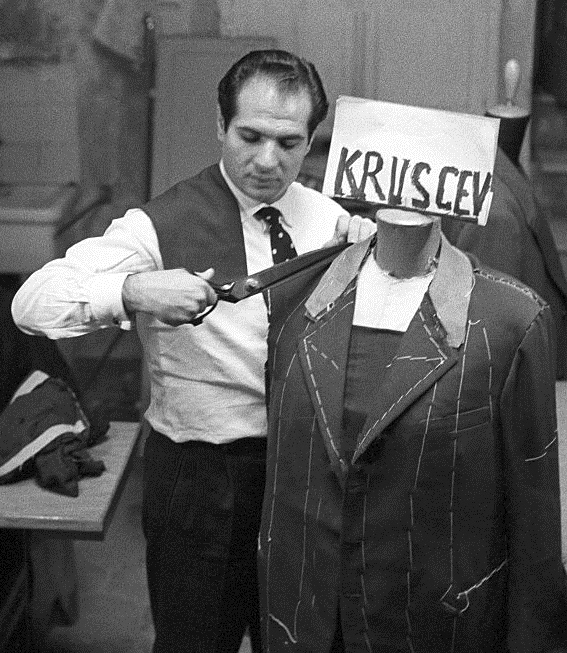
Angelo Litrico making a coat for Nikita Khrushchev in October 1957.

But Litrico really made his mark when he was invited to participate in a 1957 export drive to Russia by the Italian fashion industry. Litrico used photos to make a coat as a gift for Nikita Khrushchev. Khrushchev was so pleased with it that he commissioned a full wardrobe from Litrico for his famous trip to the US in September 1959. This included the shoes that would become famous by being slammed on the table at the United Nations General Assembly in October 1960.

American journalists were so intrigued to see a well-dressed Soviet premier that they asked for the name of his tailor. When Litrico went to the USA shortly afterwards, he found himself besieged by journalists, and his fame was assured. He dressed many world leaders of the era, such as John F. Kennedy, Juan Perón, Tito, Dwight D. Eisenhower, and King Hussein of Jordan.

Litrico was awarded several Italian orders of merit: Knight (1962), Officer (1965), Commander (1968) and Grand Officer (1972). He had a particularly close relationship with Christiaan Barnard which extended beyond dressing the heart surgery pioneer; Litrico helped to pay for hundreds of children to go to Cape Town for operations under Barnard.

He died of heart failure on 13 March 1986 at the Agostino Gemelli University Polyclinic in Rome after breaking his hip. He was aged 58.

== Company ==
After Angelo's death, his brother Franco and sister Giusi took over the company. Franco's son Luca joined the company and since Franco's death in 2004 he has expanded the company's range under the "Franco Litrico" label until 2012, when he decided to found his label "Luca Litrico". Today Luca is bringing on the family tradition for the top expression of the tailor made Italian fashion, and is also promoting the Litrico Tailor Historical Archive named by Italian Ministry of National Historical Value.

== See also ==
- C&A
- Shoe-banging incident
