= Olle Nordberg (painter) =

Swedish painter

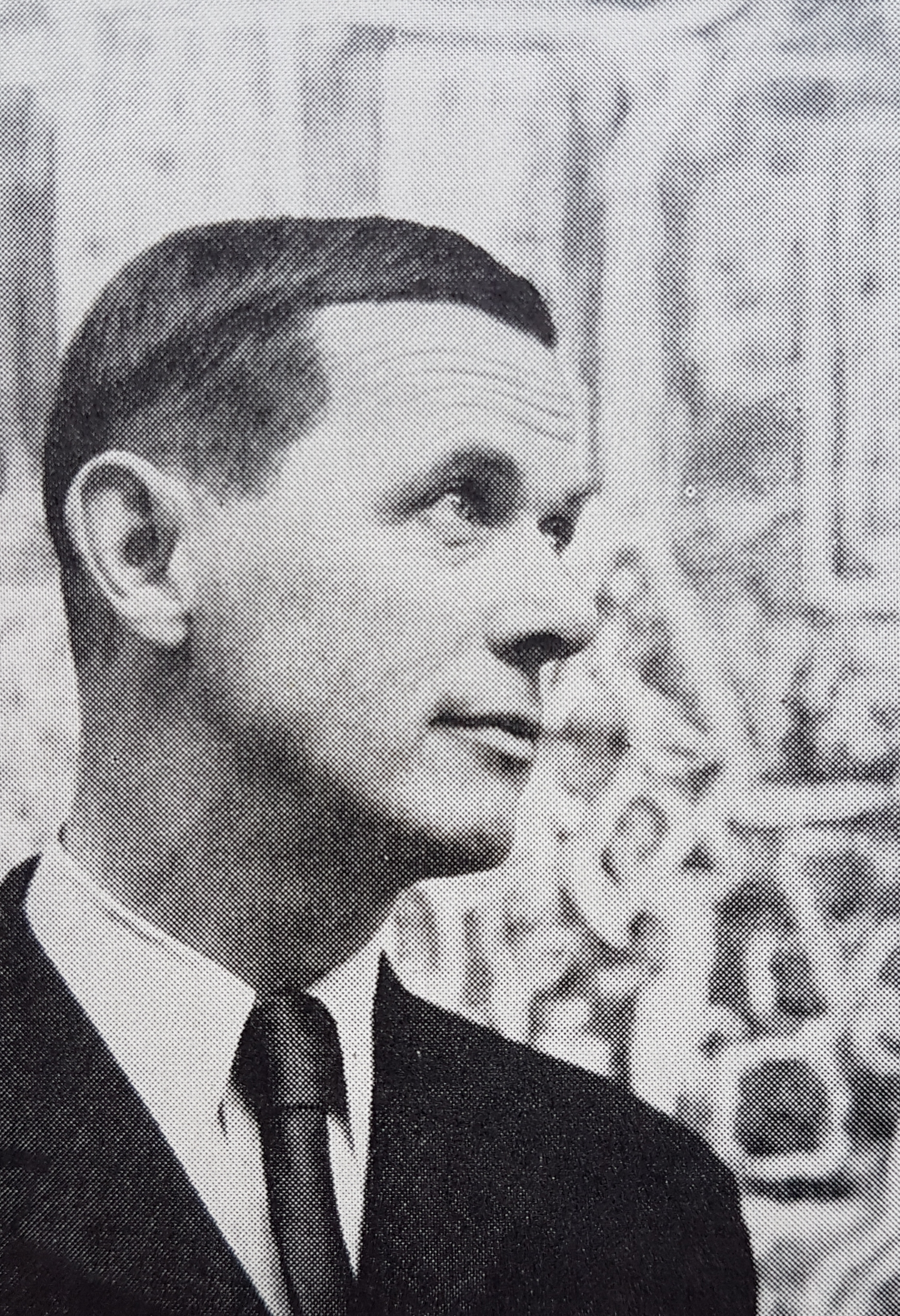
- Born: 9 June 1905; Munsö, Sweden
- Died: 28 March 1986 (aged 80); Ekerö, Sweden
- Occupation: Painter

Olle Nordberg (9 June 1905 – 28 March 1986) was a Swedish painter. His work was part of the painting event in the art competition at the 1936 Summer Olympics.
