= C&A =

International chain of clothing stores

- Type: Subsidiary
- Traded as: B3: CEAB3 (only the unit in Brazil, C&A Modas SA)
- Industry: Retail
- Founded: 1841; 185 years ago (in Sneek, Netherlands)
- Founders: Clemens and August Brenninkmeijer
- Headquarters: Vilvoorde, Belgium; Düsseldorf, Germany
- Number of locations: 1290 (2022)
- Area served: Continental Europe; Brazil; China (licensed); Mexico (licensed)
- Key people: Giny Boer (CEO C&A Europe)
- Products: Apparel; Accessories; Footwear
- Number of employees: 50,000
- Parent: Cofra Holding
- Website: www.c-and-a.com

C&A is a European designer and retailer specializing in fast fashion, with a focus on casual wear. The company operates approximately 1,250 stores in Europe and 330 in Brazil, as well as websites for online shopping. In Brazil, C&A is operated through a joint venture, C&A Modas S.A., which is listed on the B3 stock exchange in São Paulo. It also licenses the C&A name for stores in Mexico and China, which are under different ownership.

C&A's brands include Angelo Litrico, Avanti, Clockhouse, Here+There, Palomino, Rodeo, Westbury, Yessica, Yessica Pure, and Your Sixth Sense.

The company name is derived from the initials of its founders, Clemens (1818–1902) and August (1819–1892) Brenninkmeijer. The Brenninkmeijer family owns C&A through Cofra Holding, organized in Switzerland.

== History ==
=== Foundation ===
The Brenninkmeyer family had traded in linen and textiles since the 17th century from Mettingen, Germany. In 1841, a Dutch textile firm was founded in Sneek by brothers Clemens and August Brenninkmeijer, later taking its company name from the initials of the founders. The family was very secretive, in part to avoid customs scrutiny, and upon reaching age 14, male members of the family were given the choice of working for C&A or joining the Catholic priesthood. In 1906, Clemens' son, Bernard Joseph, started operating in Amsterdam. By 1910, there were ten C&A stores in the Netherlands.

In 1974, C&A was one of the sponsors of the 1974 FIFA World Cup. In 1978, C&A sponsored cycling through Eddy Merckx's team, taking over from Fiat France.

=== 2000-present ===
In June 2000, C&A announced the closure of all 109 of its stores in the United Kingdom, where it had been operating since 1922, as well as its stores in Ireland, located in Dublin and Belfast. It had used the name C&A Modes. The last UK retail stores closed in 2001. Primark bought six C&A stores.

In June 2009, C&A closed its stores in Argentina.

In the summer of 2010, Beyoncé released a clothing line, House of Deréon, in cooperation with C&A.

In January 2017, the company closed 23 stores in Spain as part of a restructuring.

In May and June 2017, the company closed four stores in the Netherlands due to poor sales.

In April 2019, the company planned to close 14 stores in France.

In January 2020, it announced 30 additional store closures in France.

In February 2020, Grupo Axo agreed to buy C&A Mexico, but cancelled the contract in March 2021.

In August 2020, C&A sold C&A China to Zhongke Tongrong Private Equity to operate the stores via franchising.

In 2021 and 2022, the company closed 70 stores and focused on online sales.

In March 2022, the company shut its Canda brand, which produced formalwear, due to the decline in sales during the COVID-19 pandemic.

In June 2022, C&A began selling clothing via Amazon.

Also in July 2022, it was discovered that C&A's Serbian division was the victim of customs fraud on the import of goods from China. The unpaid duties led to the Serbian division filing bankruptcy and closing its 14 stores.

The Paris flagship stores on Boulevard Haussmann and Rue de Rivoli were closed in February 2023.

In June 2023, the company announced the closure of five stores in Spain.

In June 2023, C&A Mexico was sold to Grupo Alfar, owner of the Mexican Cuidado con el Perro stores.

In March 2025, the company announced a plan to close 24 stores and 57 shop-in-shops (inside hypermarkets) in France.

The company reduced its footprint in Spain from 80 stores in 2023 to 73 in mid-2025.

== Locations ==
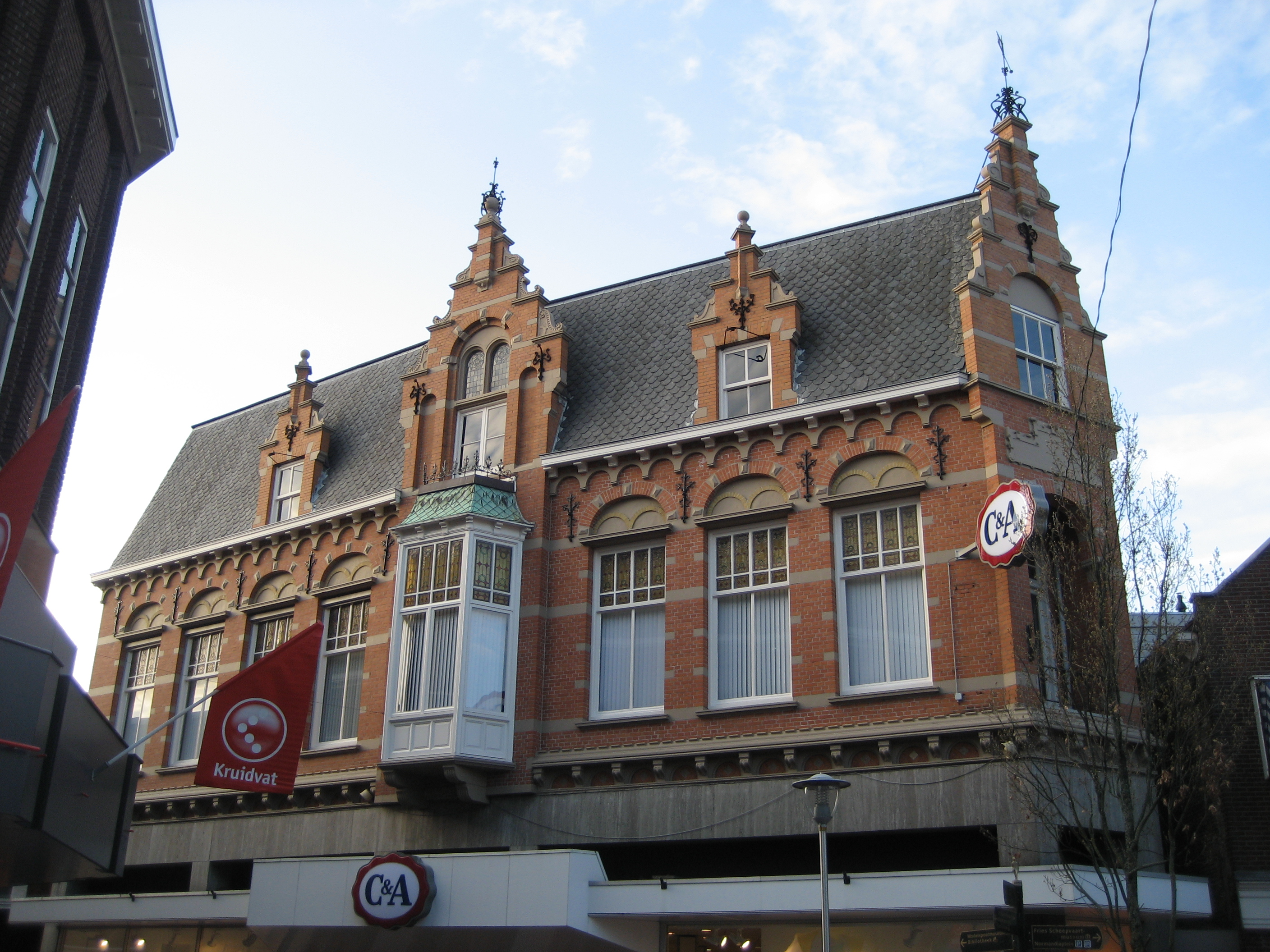
C&A in Sneek, Netherlands, where the company was founded.

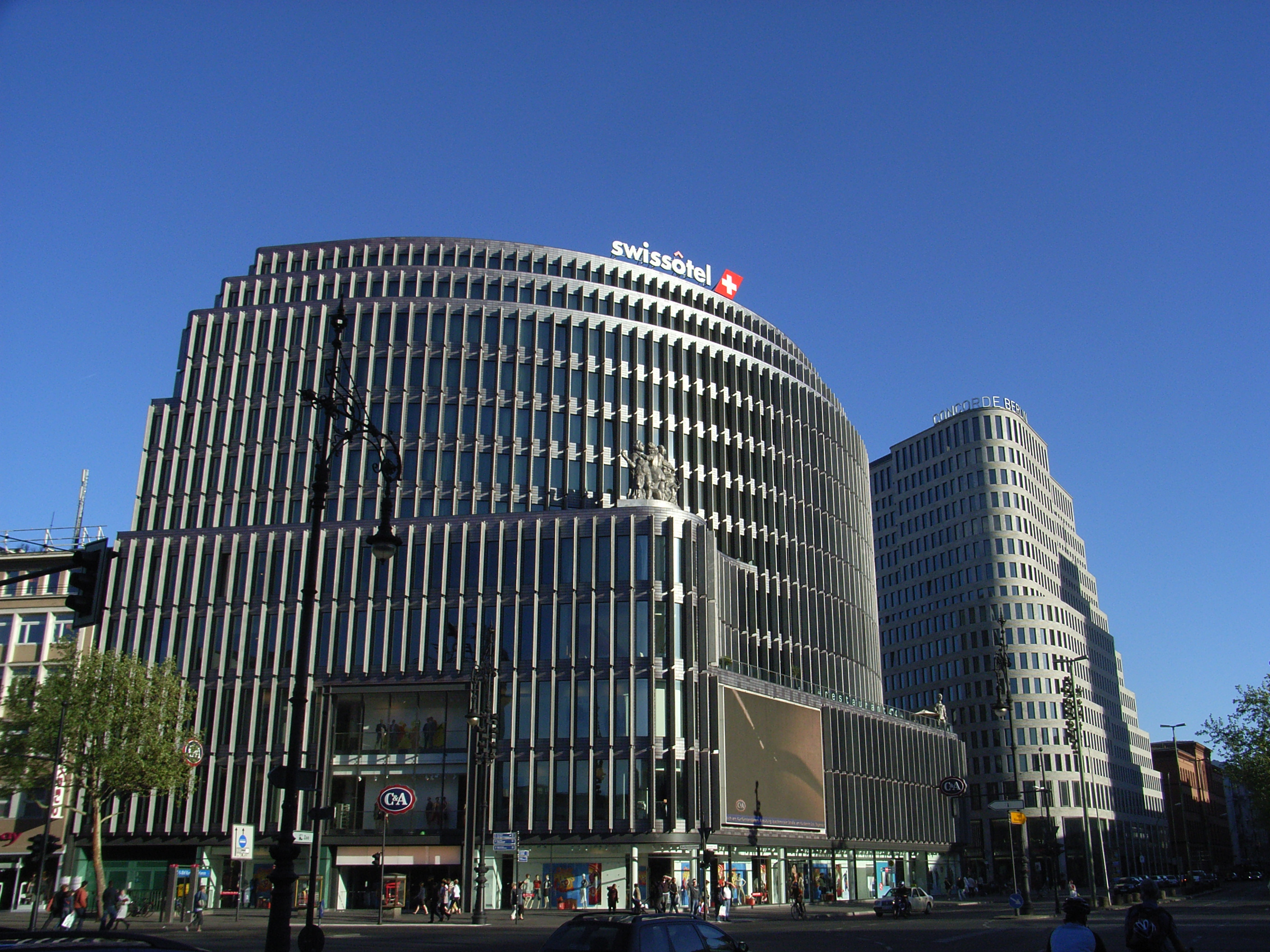
C&A in Berlin, Germany, with the Swissôtel Berlin in the same building.

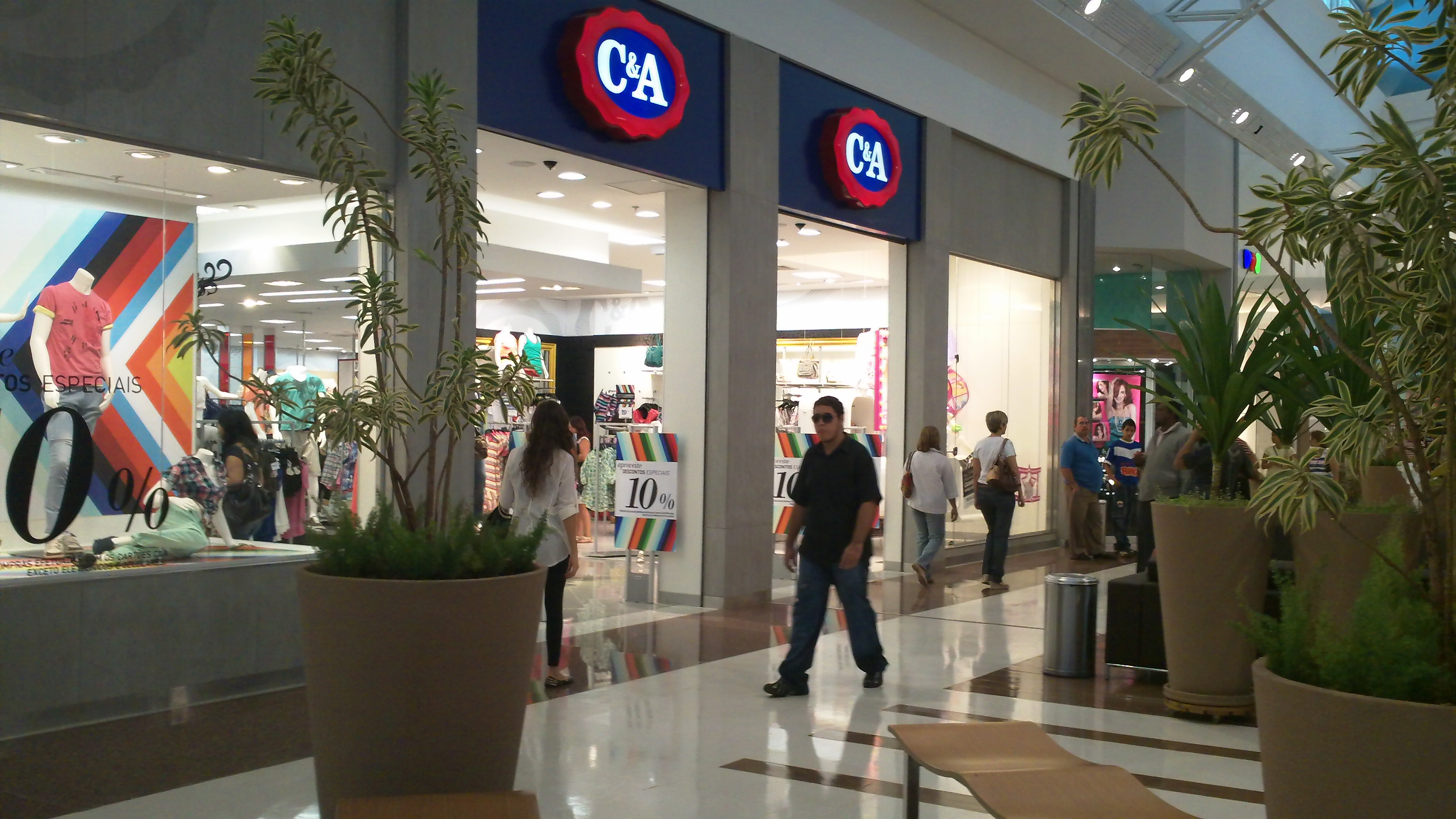
C&A store at a mall in Uberaba, Brazil.

As of 2025, C&A had stores in the following countries:

Country	No. of stores	As of
Austria	89	July 2025
Belgium	96	July 2025
Brazil	330	December 2023
China	23	May 2023
Croatia	26	July 2025
Czechia	40	July 2025
France	136	July 2025
Germany	381	July 2025
Hungary	32	July 2025
Italy	10	July 2025
Luxembourg	7	July 2025
Mexico	89	July 2025
Netherlands	95	July 2025
Poland	51	July 2025
Portugal	24	July 2025
Romania	56	July 2025
Slovakia	14	July 2025
Slovenia	15	July 2025
Spain	73	July 2025
Switzerland	93	July 2025
Total	1690	

== Legal issues ==
In December 2021, the European Center for Constitutional and Human Rights filed a criminal complaint in a Dutch court against C&A and other brands, including Lidl and Hugo Boss, alleging that they benefited from and were complicit in the use of forced labour by Uyghurs in Xinjiang.

In 2022, the company was accused of sourcing clothing from a manufacturer in Myanmar that suppressed labour unions.

== Environmental issues ==
In 2026, the company's "Iconic Puffer" jackets were noted by Greenpeace to have high levels of PFAS. Greenpeace accused the company of "significant lack of transparency".

== In popular culture ==
- The Specials referenced C&A in "Man at C&A" on the 1980 album More Specials. The phrase "Man at C&A" was later used to typify someone who was unfashionable.
- In an episode of the sitcom Only Fools and Horses, Del Boy tells his brother Rodney that when they become millionaires, their clothes will "come from Man at C&A".
- The Belle and Sebastian song "Expectations" features a character who is given the choice between working at Debenhams and C&A "cause that's what they expect".
- In Chapter 12 of the novel Lucky Jim by Kingsley Amis, a character at a crowded dance says "Can't we go and sit down for a bit? This is a bit too much like a C. and A. sale for me".
