= Allene Talmey =

American columnist, film critic (1903–1986)

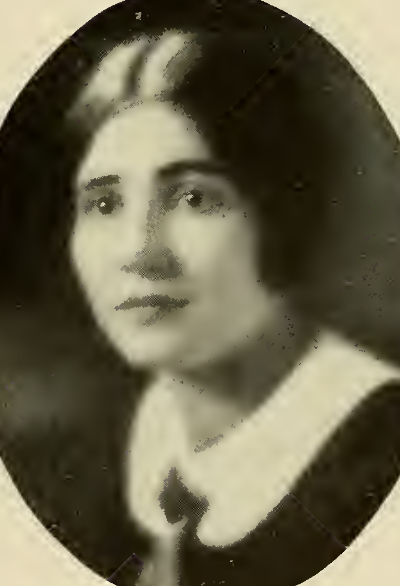
- Allene Talmey, from the 1924 Wellesley College yearbook
- Born: Allene Rosamond Talmey; January 11, 1903; Brookline, Massachusetts, United States
- Died: March 13, 1986 (aged 83); Manhattan, United States
- Other names: Allene Plaut (privately, after 1927)
- Occupations: Columnist; Associate editor; Reporter; Film reviewer
- Years active: 1936–1971
- Spouse: Richard L. Plaut (d. 1974)
- Relatives: Richard L. Jr. (son); Georgia Talmey Colin (sister)

Allene Rosamond Talmey (January 11, 1903 – March 13, 1986), later Allene Talmey Plaut, was an American columnist, editor, reporter and a film reviewer. She worked with various magazines and newspapers, including Vogue magazine, where she was a columnist and associate editor after joining the staff around 1936.

== Early life and education ==
Talmey was born Brookline, Massachusetts, and raised in New Rochelle, New York, the daughter of George N. Talmey and Rose A. Brodsky Talmey. She had sisters Marjorie and Georgia, and a brother, Paul. Talmey graduated from the Wellesley College in 1924.

== Career ==
Talmey was hired to write at a New York newspaper directly out of college. She served as a managing editor at the Vanity Fair and as a reporter at The New York Morning World and The Evening World. She was also associated with Time magazine as a film reviewer and the associate editor of The Stage magazine.

Talmey worked at Vogue for over thirty years, beginning in 1936, continuing through World War II, and serving as an associate editor from 1963 until she retired in 1971. She was "editor of everything at Vogue that is not beauty or fashion," explained a 1967 profile. Later, she worked at the magazine as a contributing editor, reviewing books and films, and writing biographies related to medicine and politics.

Talmey wrote Doug and Mary, and Others (1927), a book of essays about Douglas Fairbanks, Mary Pickford and other Hollywood figures, with woodcut illustrations by Bertrand Zadig. An edited collection of her columns, People Are Talking About... People and Things in Vogue, was published as an oversized illustrated volume in 1970.

== Personal life ==
Talmey married Richard L. Plaut in 1927. They had a son, Richard L. Jr. She was widowed when Plaut died in 1974; she died in 1986, aged 83, in New York City.
