= Irina =

Irina or Iryna (Cyrillic: Ирина, Ірина) is a feminine given name of Ancient Greek origin, commonly borne by followers of the Eastern Orthodox Church. It is derived from Eirene (Ancient Greek: Εἰρήνη), an ancient Greek goddess, personification of peace. It is mostly used in countries within the Commonwealth of Independent States and the Balkans.

Diminutive forms in Slavic languages include Ira, Irynka, Irinushka, Irinochka, Irisha, Irka, Irochka, Irusia, Iraya, Irayna.

== Origin ==
Irina is connected with Irene of Macedonia who was the first woman recognized by the church as a great martyr. She was born pagan as Penelope and later baptized as Irene. Some sources refer to her being baptized by Saint Timothy, in which case she lived in the 1st–2nd century, while others date her death in the year 315. Opinions also differ about the location of her birthplace, the city of Magedon, placing it either in Persia or in Migdonia (Macedonia).

== Notable people with this name ==
=== Nobility and politics ===
- Princess Irina Alexandrovna of Russia (1895–1970)
- Iryna Akimova (born 1960), Ukrainian politician
- Irina Berezhna (1980–2017), Ukrainian politician
- Irina Belykh (born 1964), Russian politician
- Irina Cabezas (born 1971), Ecuadorian politician and educator
- Irina Dunn (born 1948), Australian politician
- Iryna Farion (born 1964), Ukrainian linguist and politician
- Irina Filatova (born 1978), Russian politician
- Iryna Friz (born 1974), Ukrainian politician
- Irina Ivenskikh, Russian politician
- Irina Khakamada (born 1955), Russian politician
- Iryna Konstankevych, Ukrainian politician
- Irina Kovalchuk (born 1989), Ukrainian rhythmic gymnast
- Irina Kozhanova (born 1987), Russian politician
- Irina Krohn (born 1962), Finnish politician
- Irina Davydovna Kuznetsova, Soviet-Latvian communist politician
- Irina Lozovan (born 1983), Moldovan politician
- Iryna Lutsenko, Ukrainian politician
- Irina Mikhailovna of Russia (1627–1679), Russian Tsarevna
- Irina Mikhailovna Raievskya (1892–1955), Russian and German noble
- Irina Molokanova, Transnistrian politician
- Irina Ovtchinnikova (1904–1990), Marquise de Monléon
- Irina Paley (1903–1990), daughter of Grand Duke Paul Alexandrovich of Russia
- Irina Panchenko (born 1968), Russian politician
- Irina Pankina, Russian politician
- Irina Petina (born 1972), Russian politician
- Irina Rodnina (born 1949), Russian politician and figure skater
- Irina Rozova (1958–2023), Lithuanian politician
- Irina Rukavishnikova (born 1973), Russian politician
- Iryna Sekh (born 1970), Ukrainian politician
- Irina Smirnova (born 1960), Kazakhstani politician
- Iryna Suslova (born 1988), Ukrainian politician
- Iryna Sysoyenko (born 1982), Ukrainian politician
- Iryna Venediktova (born 1978), Ukrainian politician
- Iryna Vereshchuk (born 1979), Deputy Prime Minister of Ukraine and Minister of Reintegration of Temporarily Occupied Territories
- Irina Vlah (born 1974), Moldovan politician
- Irina von Wiese (born 1967), British politician
- Irina Walker (born 1953), daughter of King Michael I of Romania
- Irina Yarovaya (born 1966), Russian jurist and politician
- Irina Yusupova (1915–1983), Russian princess
- Iryna Yefremova (born 1959), Ukrainian politician

=== Arts and music ===
- Irina Allegrova (born 1952), Russian singer
- Irina Antonenko (born 1991), Miss Russia 2010
- Irina Arkhipova (1925–2010), Soviet and Russian opera singer
- Irina Baldina (1922–2009), Russian artist
- Irina Belotelkin (1913–2009), Russian—American artist and fashion designer
- Irina Björklund (born 1973), Finnish actress and singer
- Irina Bogacheva (1939–2019), Russian opera singer
- Irina Bogushevskaya (born 1965), Russian singer
- Irina Brzhevskaya (1929–2019), Russian pop singer and soprano
- Iryna Vilyamivna Dats (born 1963), Ukrainian opera singer and theater director
- Irina Dobrekova (born 1931), Russian painter
- Irina Dorofeeva (born 1977), Belarusian singer and politician
- Irina Dubkova, Russian composer
- Irina Dubtsova (born 1982), Russian singer-songwriter and actress
- Irina Elcheva (1926–2013), Russian composer
- Irina Emeliantseva (born 1973), Russian musician
- Iryna Fedyshyn (born 1987), Ukrainian singer and songwriter
- Irina Getmanskaya (born 1939), Russian artist
- Irina Gribulina (born 1953), Soviet composer and poet
- Irina Hasnaș (born 1954), Romanian composer
- Irina Ionesco (1930–2022), French photographer
- Irina Iordachescu (born 1977), Romanian soprano opera singer
- Irina Karnaoukhova (1901–1959), Ukrainian-Russian children's writer and folklorist
- Irina Kotova (born 1976), Belarusian—French painter and graphic artist
- Irina Kulikova (born 1982), Russian classical guitarist
- Iryna Kyrylina (1953–2017), Ukrainian composer
- Irina Lankova (born 1977), Russian—born Belgian concert pianist
- Irina Levshakova (1959–2016), Russian paleontologist and artist
- Irina Loghin (born 1939), Romanian folk singer
- Irina Lungu (born 1980), Russian operatic soprano
- Irina Nakhova, Russian painter
- Irina Odagescu (born 1937), Romanian music educator and composer
- Irina Plotnikova (born 1954), Russian pianist
- Irina Ponarovskaya (born 1953), Russian actor and singer
- Irina Rimes (born 1991), Moldavian-Romanian singer and songwriter
- Irina Rubtsova (born 1957), Russian opera singer
- Irina Saari (born 1975), Finnish pop singer, better known by her mononym Irina
- Irina Saltykova (born 1966), Russian singer
- Irina Smelaya (born 1991), Russian hip-hop artist
- Irina Stolyarova (born 1966), Russian art collector
- Irina Terehova (born 1989), Canadian model and reality television personality
- Irina Toneva (born 1977), Russian pop singer
- Irina Zabiyaka (born 1982), Russian singer
- Irina Zahharenkova (born 1976), Estonian and Finnish concert pianist
- Irina Zaritskaya (1939–2001), Ukrainian pianist
- Irina Zhurina (born 1946), Russian operatic coloratura soprano

=== Actresses and models ===
- Irina Afanasieva, Russian theater producer
- Irina Alfyorova (born 1951), Soviet and Russian actress
- Irina Apeksimova (born 1966), Russian ballet dancer and actress
- Irina Baeva (born 1992), Russian actress and model
- Irina Baronova (1919–2008), Russian ballerina and actress
- Irina Björklund (born 1973), Finnish actress and singer
- Irina Brazgovka (born 1954), Soviet and Russian actress
- Irina Brook (born 1962), British stage director, producer and actress
- Irina Brown, Russian theatre director
- Irina Bugrimova (1910–2001), Russian circus performer
- Irina Demick (1936–2004), French actress
- Irina Dvorovenko (born 1973), Ukrainian-American ballet dancer and actress
- Irina Fedotova, Russian model and fashion designer
- Irina Gorbacheva (born 1988), Russian theater and film actress
- Irina Gorovaia (born 1989), American actress
- Irina Grjebine (1909–1994), Russian ballet dancer
- Irina Gubanova (1940–2000), Russian ballerina and film actress
- Irina Hudova (1926–2015), Finnish ballet dancer and teacher
- Irina Kaptelova (born 1986), Ukrainian actress
- Irina Kolesnikova (born 1980), Russian ballet dancer
- Irina Kolpakova (born 1933), Russian ballerina
- Irina Kovalenko, Russian model
- Irina Kulikova (model) (born 1991), Russian fashion model
- Irina Kupchenko (born 1948), Soviet and Russian actress
- Irina Lăzăreanu (born 1982), Canadian model and singer
- Irina Leonova (born 1978), Russian theater and film actress
- Irina Medvedeva (born 1982), Russian and Belarusian actress
- Irina Miroshnichenko (1942–2023), Soviet and Russian actress
- Irina Muluile (born 1989), French actress
- Irina Murzaeva (1906–1988), Soviet actress
- Irina Pantaeva (born 1967), Siberian fashion model and actress
- Irina Petrescu (1941–2013), Romanian actress
- Irina Rozanova (born 1961), Soviet and Russian actress
- Irina Shabayeva (born 1982), American fashion designer
- Irina Shayk (born 1986), model originally from Russia
- Irina Skobtseva (1927–2020), Soviet and Russian actress
- Irina Skvortsova (born 1988), Russian TV presenter and bobsleigh racer
- Irina Sosnovaya, Russian film producer
- Irina Starshenbaum (born 1992), Russian actress
- Irina Taseva (1910–1990), Bulgarian actress
- Irina Terehova (born 1989), Canadian model and reality TV personality
- Iryna Tsilyk (born 1982), Ukrainian writer and film director
- Irina Voronina (born 1977), Playboy Playmate originally from Russia
- Irina Wrona, German actress
- Irina Zarubina (1907–1976), Soviet actress
- Irina Zhdanovich (1906–1994), Belarusian actress and theatre director
- Iryna Zhuravska (born 1990), Ukrainian model

=== Sports ===
- Irina Abysova (born 1980), Russian triathlete
- Irina Aksyonova (born 1962), Russian swimmer
- Irina Alexandrova (born 1994), Kazakhstani handball player
- Irina Alexeeva (born 2002), Russian gymnast
- Irina Amalie Andersen (born 1998), Danish badminton player
- Irina Andreeva (born 1994), Russian sprint canoeist
- Irina Annenkova (born 1999), Russian rhythmic gymnast
- Irina Antonova (born 1986), Kazakhstani-Russian handball player
- Irina Anurina (born 1999), Russian athlete
- Irina Armstrong (born 1970), German darts player
- Irina Avvakumova (born 1991), Russian ski jumper
- Iryna Balashova, Ukrainian Paralympic swimmer
- Irina Bara (born 1995), Romanian tennis player
- Irina Baskakova (born 1956), Soviet track and field sprinter
- Irina Bazilevskaya (born 1970), Belarusian rower
- Irina Beglyakova (1933–2018), Soviet discus thrower
- Irina-Camelia Begu (born 1990), Romanian tennis player
- Irina Belova, Russian heptathlete
- Irina Belova (born 1980), Russian rhythmic gymnast
- Irina Bespalova (born 1981), Russian butterfly swimmer
- Irina Birvagen (born 1988), Kazakhstani footballer
- Irina Bliznova (born 1986), Russian handball player
- Irina Bogacheva (born 1961), Kyrgyzstani long-distance runner
- Irina Bondarchuk (born 1952), Russian female long-distance runner
- Irina Borechko (born 1972), Kazakhstani handball player
- Irina Borodavko (born 1979), Kazakhstani water polo player
- Irina Borzova (born 1987), Russian acrobatic gymnast
- Irina Bulakhova, Ukrainian gymnast
- Irina Bulmaga (born 1993), Moldovan-born Romanian chess player
- Irina Buryachok (born 1986), Ukrainian tennis player
- Irina Bykova (born 1993), Kazakhstani cross-country skier
- Irina Chelushkina (born 1961), Serbian chess player
- Irina Cherniaeva (born 1955), Russian figure skater
- Irina Crasnoscioc (born 1981), Moldovan basketball player
- Irina Danilova (born 1993), Kazakhstani handball player
- Irina Davydova (born 1988), Russian hurdler
- Irina Deleanu (born 1975), Romanian former individual rhythmic gymnast
- Irina Deriugina (born 1958), Soviet rhythmic gymnast
- Irina Devina (born 1959), Soviet rhythmic gymnast
- Irina Dolgova (born 1995), Russian judoka
- Irina Donets (born 1976), Dutch volleyball player
- Irina Dorneanu (born 1990), Romanian rower
- Irina Ektova (born 1987), Kazakhstani triple jumper
- Irina Embrich (born 1980), Estonian fencer
- Irina Ermolova, Soviet tennis player
- Irina Falconi (born 1990), Ecuadorian-born American tennis player
- Iryna Fedoriv (born 2005), Ukrainian canoeist
- Irina Fedotova (born 1975), Russian rower
- Irina Fetecău (born 1996), Romanian tennis player
- Irina Fetisova (born 1956), Soviet swimmer and rower
- Irina Fetisova (born 1994), Russian volleyball player
- Irina Filishtinskaya (born 1990), Russian volleyball player
- Irina Gashennikova (born 1975), Russian ice hockey player
- Irina Gerasimenok (born 1970), Russian sport shooter
- Irina Gerlits (born 1966), Kazakhstani basketball player
- Irina Glimakova, Russian tennis and beach player
- Irina Gordeeva (born 1986), Russian high jumper
- Irina Grazhdanova (born 1987), Russian Paralympic swimmer
- Irina Gribko (born 1969), Soviet rower
- Irina Grigorieva, Russian former footballer
- Irina Grishkova (born 1946), Soviet ice dancer
- Irina Gritsenko (born 1968), French-Kazakhstani badminton player
- Irina Gubkina (born 1972), Russian luger
- Irina Gulyayeva (born 1984), Russian biathlete
- Irina Gumenyuk (born 1988), Russian triple jumper
- Iryna Honcharova (born 1974), Ukrainian handball player
- Irina Hornig, German skydiver
- Irina Ilchenko (born 1968), Russian volleyball player
- Irina Ilyenkova (born 1980), Belarusian rhythmic gymnast
- Irina Ivanova (born 1996), Russian pole vaulter
- Irina Izmalkova (born 1970), Russian sport shooter
- Irina Kalentieva (born 1977), Russian cyclist
- Irina Kalimbet (born 1968), Soviet rower
- Irina Kalinina (born 1959), Soviet diver
- Irina Kalyanova (born 1966), Russian Paralympic judoka
- Irina Karavayeva (born 1975), Russian trampoline gymnast
- Irina Karpova (born 1980), Kazakhstani heptathlete
- Irina Kasimova (born 1971), Russian weightlifter
- Irina Kaydashova (born 1985), Uzbekistani taekwondo practitioner
- Irina Kazakevich (born 1997), Russian biathlete
- Irina Kazakova (born 1986), Russian rhythmic gymnast
- Irina Kazantseva (born 1978), Russian Paralympic powerlifter
- Irina Khabarova (born 1966), Russian sprinter
- Irina Khavronina (born 2004), Russian ice dancer
- Irina Khazova (born 1984), Russian cross-country skier
- Irina Khitrova (born 1953), Bulgarian gymnast
- Irina Khlebko (born 1990), Russian badminton player
- Irina Khmelevskaya (born 1968), Soviet canoeist
- Irina Khromacheva (born 1995), Russian tennis player
- Irina Khudoroshkina (born 1968), Russian shot putter
- Irina Kikkas (born 1984), Estonian rhythmic gymnast
- Iryna Kindzerska (born 1991), Ukrainian-born Azerbaijani judoka
- Irina Kirichenko (1937–2020), Soviet cyclist
- Irina Kirillova (born 1965), Soviet and Croatian volleyball player
- Irina Kiseleva (born 1967), Soviet modern pentathlete
- Irina Klimovschi (1936–2001), Romanian handball player
- Irina Kolesnikova (born 1964), Russian female curler and curling coach
- Iryna Koliadenko (born 1998), Ukrainian wrestler
- Iryna Kompaniiets (born 1993), Ukrainian handball player
- Irina Konstantinova (born 1976), Bulgarian windsurfer
- Irina Kornienko (born 1978), Russian tennis player
- Irina Koroleva (born 1991), Russian volleyball player
- Irina Korzhanenko (born 1974), Russian shot putter
- Irina Kostyuchenkova (1961–2023), Ukrainian javelin thrower
- Irina Kotkina (born 1986), Russian tennis player
- Irina Krakoviak-Tolstika (born 1977), Lithuanian middle-distance runner
- Iryna Krasnianska (born 1987), Ukrainian artistic gymnast
- Irina Krivonogova (born 2000), Russian swimmer
- Irina Krush (born 1983), chess player
- Irina Kryukova (born 1968), Russian chess player
- Irina Kuhnt (born 1968), German field hockey player
- Irina Kuleshova-Kovrova (born 1962), Russian speed skater
- Irina Kusakina (born 1965), Russian luger
- Irina Kuzmina-Rimša (born 1986), Latvian tennis player
- Irina Laricheva (1964–2020), Russian trap shooter
- Irina Laricheva (born 1963), Soviet swimmer
- Irina Lashko (born 1973), Russian-born Australian diver
- Irina Latve (born 1981), Latvian middle-distance runner
- Irina Lauric (born 1992), Romanian canoeist
- Irina Lenskiy (born 1971), Ukrainian-born Israeli athlete
- Irina Leonova (born 1961), Kazakhstani archer
- Irina Leparskaya (born 1957), Belarusian rhythmic gymnastics coach
- Irina Lepșa (born 1992), Romanian weightlifter
- Irina Levitina (born 1954), Russian-born American chess and bridge player
- Irina Litovchenko (born 1950), Soviet hurdler
- Irina Liuliakova (born 1945), Soviet figure skater
- Irina Lobacheva (born 1973), Russian ice dancer
- Irina Lukomskaya (born 1991), Kazakhstani volleyball player
- Irina Lyakhovskaya (1941–2003), Russian swimmer
- Irina Lyalina (born 1968), Uzbekistani canoeist
- Irina Maharani (born 1961), Malaysian sport shooter
- Irina Makogonova (born 1959), Soviet volleyball player
- Irina Maracheva (born 1984), Russian middle-distance runner
- Irina Markovic (born 1976), Dutch archer
- Irina Matrosova (born 1962), Uzbekistani long-distance runner
- Irina Meleshina (born 1982), Russian long jumper
- Iryna Merkushyna, Ukrainian biathlete
- Irina Meszynski (born 1962), East German discus thrower
- Irina Mikitenko (born 1972), Kazakhstan-born German long-distance runner, former winner of both the Berlin and London marathons
- Irina Minkh (born 1964), Russian basketball player
- Irina Mistyukevich (born 1977), Russian middle-distance runner
- Irina Molicheva (born 1988), Russian cyclist
- Iryna Movchan (born 1990), Ukrainian figure skater
- Irina Müller (born 1951), East German rower
- Irina Mushayilova (born 1967), Russian athletics competitor
- Irina Nazarova (born 1957), Soviet sprinter
- Irina Nekrassova (born 1988), Kazakhstani weightlifter
- Irina Netreba (born 1991), Azerbaijani sport wrestler
- Irina Nikitina (born 1990), Russian handball player
- Irina Nikulchina (born 1974), Bulgarian biathlete
- Irina Obedina (born 1985), Russian hurdler
- Irina Ologonova (born 1990), Russian freestyle swimmer
- Irina Orendi, Romanian high jumper
- Irina Osipova (born 1981), Russian basketball player
- Irina Ouioutova (born 1979), Russian volleyball player
- Irina Palina (born 1970), Russian table tennis player
- Irina Pando (born 1995), Swiss footballer
- Irina Perevertkina (born 1967), Russian chess player
- Irina Permitina (born 1968), Russian long-distance runner
- Irina Pershina (born 1978), Russian synchronized swimmer
- Irina Pervushina (born 1942), Russian artistic gymnast
- Irina Petculeț (born 1956), Romanian volleyball player
- Irina Petrova (born 1985), Russian race walker
- Irina Podoinikova (born 1988), Kazakhstani canoeist
- Iryna Podolska (born 1995), Ukrainian footballer
- Irina Podshibyakina (born 1995), Russian footballer
- Irina Podyalovskaya (born 1959), Soviet middle distance runner
- Irina Polechtchouk (born 1973), Belarusian-French volleyball player
- Irina Poltoratskaya (born 1979), Russian handball player
- Irina Pop (born 1988), Dominican Republic handball player
- Irina Pozdnyakova (born 1953), Russian swimmer
- Iryna Prasiantsova (born 1996), Belarusian modern pentathlete
- Irina Press (1939–2004), Soviet 2x Olympic champion (80-m hurdles & pentathlon)
- Irina Privalova (born 1968), Russian Olympic gold medallist athlete
- Irina Puchalska (born 1970), Ukrainian volleyball player
- Iryna Pukha (born 1973), Ukrainian sprinter
- Irina Raevskaya (born 1984), Russian swimmer
- Irina Ramialison (born 1991), French tennis player
- Irina Rîngaci, Moldovan freestyle swimmer
- Irina Risenzon (born 1988), Hungarian—born Israeli rhythmic gymnast
- Irina Rodina (born 1973), Russian judoka and samba practitioner
- Irina Rodnina (born 1949), Soviet figure skater
- Irina Rodrigues (born 1991), Portuguese discus thrower
- Irina Rodríguez (born 1977), Spanish synchronized swimmer
- Irina Romanova (born 1972), Ukrainian former competitive ice dancer
- Irina Rosikhina (born 1975), Russian sprinter
- Irina Ruslyakova (born 1975), Russian badminton player
- Irina Rutkovskaya (born 1969), Russian basketball player
- Irina Safarova (born 1969), Russian long-distance runner
- Irina Sandalova (born 1992), Kazakhstani footballer
- Iryna Sanina (born 1985), Ukrainian footballer
- Irina Saratovtseva (born 1989), Kazakhstani footballer
- Irina Sazonova (born 1991), Russian-Icelandic gymnast
- Iryna Sekachova (born 1976), Ukrainian hammer thrower
- Irina Selyutina (born 1979), Kazakhstani tennis player
- Irina Semenova, Uzbekistani chess player
- Irina Serova (born 1966), Austrian-Soviet badminton player
- Iryna Shchukla, (born 1995), Ukrainian-Turkish fencer
- Irina Shevchenko (born 1975), Russian hurdler
- Irina Shilova (born 1960), Belarusian sports shooter
- Irina Shlemova (born 1984), Uzbekistani swimmer
- Irina Shorokhova (born 1997), Russian badminton player
- Irina Shtork (born 1993), Estonian ice dancer
- Irina Sidorkova (born 2003), Russian racing driver
- Irina Sidorova (born 1962), Soviet diver
- Irina Sirina (born 1967), Hungarian handball player
- Irina Skripnik (born 1970), Belarusian cross-country skier
- Irina Slutskaya (born 1979), Russian world champion figure skater
- Irina Slyusar (born 1963), Ukrainian sprinter
- Irina Smolnikova (born 1980), Kazakhstani long-distance runner
- Irina Snopova (born 1995), Russian handball player
- Irina Sokolovskaya (born 1983), Russian basketball player
- Irina Soldatova (1965–2002), Russian archer
- Irina Spîrlea (born 1974), Romanian tennis player
- Irina Stankina (born 1977), Russian racewalker
- Irina Starykh (born 1987), Russian biathlete
- Iryna Stelmakh (born 1993), Ukrainian handball player
- Irina Sukhorouk (born 1973), Ukrainian volleyball player
- Irina Sukhova (born 1974), Ukrainian tennis player
- Irina Sumnikova (born 1964), Russian basketball player
- Iryna Taranenko-Terelya, Ukrainian cross-country skier
- Irina Tarasova (born 1987), Russian shot putter
- Irina Tchachina (born 1982), Russian rhythmic gymnast
- Irina Tebenikhina (born 1978), Russian volleyball player
- Irina Terentjeva (born 1984), Lithuanian cross-country skier
- Irina Teterina (born 1958), Soviet rower
- Irina Timcic (1910–?), Romanian figure skater
- Irina Timofeyeva (born 1970), Russian long-distance runner
- Irina Tkatchuk (born 1983), Russian figure skater
- Irina Tolkunova (born 1971), Russian-Kazakhstani water polo player
- Irina Topal (born 1998), Moldovan footballer
- Irina Tretyakova (born 1987), Belarusian footballer
- Irina Turova (1935–2012), Soviet sprinter
- Irina Turova (born 1979), Russian chess player
- Irina Turundayevskaya (born 1947), Soviet skier
- Irina Tyukhay (born 1967), Russian heptathlete
- Irina Ufimtseva (born 1985), Russian freestyle swimmer
- Irina Ushakova (born 1954), Soviet fencer
- Iryna Ustymenko (born 1967), Ukrainian swimmer
- Iryna Vanat, Ukrainian footballer
- Irina Vasilevich (born 1985), Russian chess player
- Iryna Vaskouskaya (born 1991), Belarusian triple jumper
- Iryna Vasylyuk (born 1985), Ukrainian footballer
- Irina Velihanova (born 1996), Turkmenistan track and field athlete
- Irina Viner-Usmanova (born 1948), Russian rhythmic gymnastics coach
- Irina Vlasova (born 1957), Russian swimmer
- Iryna Volynets, Ukrainian Paralympic archer
- Irina Vorobieva (1958–2022), Russian pair skater
- Irina Voronkova (born 1995), Russian volleyball player
- Irina Vostrikova (born 1970), Russian hepathlete
- Irina Vyguzova (born 1974), Kazakhstani diver
- Iryna Yanovych (born 1976), Ukrainian cyclist
- Irina Yarotska (born 1985), Ukrainian rhythmic gymnast
- Iryna Yatchenko (born 1965), Belarusian discus thrower
- Irina Yegorova (born 1940), Russian speed skater
- Irina Yevdokimova (born 1978), Kazakhstani gymnast
- Irina Zabludina (born 1987), Russian judoka
- Irina Zaitseva (born 1982), Kazakhstani volleyball player
- Irina Zakurdjaeva (born 1982), Russian chess player
- Irina Zaretska (born 1996), Azerbaijani karateka
- Irina Zhuk (born 1966), Russian ice dancing coach and former competitor
- Iryna Zhuk (born 1993), Belarusian pole vaulter
- Irina Zilber (born 1983), Russian rhythmic gymnast
- Irina Zuykova (1958–2010), Soviet equestrian
- Iryna Zvarych (born 1983), Ukrainian footballer

=== Other ===
- Irina Antanasijević (born 1965), Russian and Serbian philologist, literary critic and translator
- Irina Antonova (1922–2020), Soviet and Russian art historian
- Irina Artemieva, Russian earth scientist and academic
- Irina Azizyan (1935–2009), Russian painter
- Irina Beletskaya (born 1933), Russian chemist
- Irina Belskaya (born 1958), Ukrainian astronomer
- Irina Bogatyryova (born 1982), Russian prose writer
- Irina Bokova (born 1952), Bulgarian diplomat
- Irina Bolychevsky, British activist and data specialist
- Irina Borogan (born 1974), Russian investigative journalist and writer
- Irina Burd, physician-scientist
- Irina Chakraborty, Russian-Finnish-Indian environmental engineer
- Irina Dobrekova (born 1931), Russian painter
- Irina Dryagina (1921–2017), Soviet military officer and botanist
- Irina Feodorova (1931–2010), Soviet ethnographer
- Irina Gaidamachuk (born 1972), prolific Russian serial killer
- Irina Getmanskaya (born 1939), Russian painter
- Irina Glushkova (born 1952), Russian philologist
- Irina Godunova (1557–1603), Russian empress
- Irina Grekova (1907–2002), Russian writer and mathematician
- Irina Grigorieva, Russian physicist
- Irina Grudzinskaya (1920–2012), Russian botanist
- Iryna Gurevych (born 1976), German computer scientist
- Iryna Horoshko (1953–2018), Ukrainian choreographer and dancer
- Irina Ilovaiskaya (1924–2000), Yugoslav journalist and activist
- Irina Ivshina (born 1950), Russian microbiologist
- Irina Kakhovskaya (1887–1960), Narodnik-inspired Russian revolutionary
- Irina Karamanos (born 1989), Chilean anthropologist and political scientist
- Iryna Khalip (born 1967), Belarusian journalist
- Irina Korschunow (1925–2013), German writer
- Irina Kraeva (born 1958), Russian linguist
- Irina Nikolaevna Levchenko (1924–1973), Russian tank commander
- Irina Livezeanu (born 1952), Romanian—American historian
- Irina Liebmann (born 1943), German journalist-author and sinologist
- Irina Linnik (1922–2009), Russian art historian
- Irina Livezeanu (born 1952), Romanian-born American historian
- Irina A. Lubensky, American anatomical pathologist
- Irina Mansurova (1925–1991), Tajikistani biochemist
- Irina Medvedeva, Russian medical scientist
- Iryna Melnykova (1918–2010), Ukrainian historian
- Irina Mishina (born 1962), Russian journalist and television presenter
- Irina Mitrea, Romanian mathematician
- Irina Nakhova, Russian painter
- Irina Nevzlin (born 1978), Israeli entrepreneur and author
- Irina Nikolaeva, Russian linguist and academic teacher
- Irina Novikova, Russian—American physicist
- Irina Nyberg, Russian orienteering competitor
- Irina Perminova, Russian chemist
- Irina Petraș (born 1947), Romanian writer
- Irina Petrushova, Russian journalist, founder and editor-in-chief
- Irina Podgorny, Argentine anthropologist
- Irina Fedorovna Popova (born 1961), Russian Sinologist and historian
- Irina Popova, Russian photographer
- Irina Posnova (1914–1997), Russian publisher
- Irina Prokhorova (born 1956), Russian historian and critic
- Irina Rakobolskaya (1919–2016), Russian physicist and aviator
- Irina Ratushinskaya (1954–2017), Russian writer
- Irina Reyn, American novelist
- Irina Rozovsky, American photographer
- Irina Rusanova (1929–1998), Russian archaeologist
- Irina Saburova (1907–1979), Russian writer
- Irina Scherbakowa, Russian historian
- Iryna Senyk (1926–2009), Ukrainian poet, nurse, and Soviet political dissident
- Irina Shevtsova (born 1983), Russian politician
- Irina Slavina (1973–2020), Russian journalist
- Irina Solovyova (born 1937), Soviet cosmonaut
- Irina Sorokina, Russian laser physicist
- Iryna Sushko, Ukrainian mathematician
- Irina Tananayko (born 1976), Belarusian biathlete
- Irina Tarasova (born 1987), Russian shot putter
- Irina Tokmakova (1929–2018), Soviet and Russian writer
- Irina Tsvila (1969–2022), Ukrainian teacher, public activist, and photographer
- Irina Tweedie (1907–1999), Russian British Sufi and teacher
- Irina Veretennicoff (born 1944), Belgian physicist
- Irina Volynets (born 1978), Russian journalist and human rights activist
- Irina Yanovskaya, Georgian journalist and human rights activist
- Iryna Yevsa (born 1956), Ukrainian poet and translator
- Irina Pavlovna Zarutskaya (1908–1990), Soviet geomorphologist, cartographer, and university professor
- Iryna Zarutska (died 2025), Ukrainian refugee killed on a transit
- Irina Zenovka (born 1972), Russian choreographer
- Iryna Zenyuk, Ukrainian-American scientist
- Irina Zherebkina, Ukrainian feminist academic
- Iryna Zhylenko (1941–2013), Ukrainian poet

== Fictional characters ==
- Irina, the child protagonist in The Enchanted Horse, children's book by Magdalen Nabb
- Irina Asanova, the great love of fictional Moscow homicide investigator Arkady Renko in the novels Gorky Park and Red Square by Martin Cruz Smith
- Irina Derevko, KGB and Covenant terrorist, a main character in the Alias television series
- Irina Palm, pseudonym of the main character in 2007 film of the same name
- Irina Spalko, a fictional Russian mobster in the film Indiana Jones and the Kingdom of the Crystal Skull
- Irina Clayton, a.k.a. Choir, a former member of the Xavier Institute student body and the Street Team X-Men in the Marvel Comics Universe
- Irina Nikolaievna Spaskaya, former KGB agent and expert pole vaulter from St.Petersburg in the 39 Clues Series
- Irina, one of the titular sisters in Anton Chekhov's play Three Sisters
- Irina Kerchenkov, a Russian model in Sarra Manning's Fashionistas book series
- Irina Denali, a member of the Denali coven in the Twilight series by Stephenie Meyer
- Irina, a character from the novel series The Heroic Legend of Arslan by Yoshiki Tanaka.
- Irina Shidō, a fictional character from the Japanese light novel series High School DxD by Ichiei Ishibumi.
- Irina, doll in the Groovy Girls doll line by Manhattan Toy
- Irina Jelavić, a fictional character in the Japanese manga and anime Assassination Classroom
- Irina Clockworker, an antagonist from a series of Vocaloid songs known as "The Evillious Chronicles"
- Irina of House Griffin, a playable character in PC game Might and Magic: Heroes VI
- Irina Luminesk, the protagonist of Irina: The Vampire Cosmonaut

== See also ==
- Irina (disambiguation)
- Saint Irene (disambiguation)
