= Lubensky =

Lubensky is a surname of Eastern European origin. People with the surname include:

- Dean Lubensky (fl. 1980s), singer in the band The Micronotz
- Irina A. Lubensky, American surgical pathologist
- Steve Lubensky (fl. 1990s–2010s), Russian cinematographer and husband of actress Brooke Smith
- Tom Lubensky (born 1943), American physicist
- Zdeněk Lubenský (born 1962), Czech athlete

== See also ==
- Lubensky Uyezd (Лубенский уезд), subdivision of the Poltava Governorate under the Russian Empire
- Keppen–Lubinsky syndrome, an extremely rare congenital disorder
- Łubieński family, Polish nobles who take their name from the village of Łubna-Jarosłaj
