= Irina Kuznetsova =

Irina Kuznetsova can refer to:

- Irina Davydovna Kuznetsova (born 1923), Soviet-Latvian politician
- Irina Levshakova (née Kuznetsova) (1959–2016), Soviet/Russian paleontologist and artist
