= Copper(II) laurate =

Names
- Other names Copper(II) dodecanoate

Identifiers
CAS Number	19179-44-3
3D model (JSmol)	Interactive image
ChemSpider	13828786
ECHA InfoCard	100.038.948
EC Number	242-860-1
PubChem CID	21219775
- InChI: InChI=1S/2C12H24O2.Cu/c2*1-2-3-4-5-6-7-8-9-10-11-12(13)14;/h2*2-11H2,1H3,(H,13,14);/q;;+2/p-2 Key: JDPSPYBMORZJOD-UHFFFAOYSA-L
- SMILES: CCCCCCCCCCCC(=O)[O-].CCCCCCCCCCCC(=O)[O-].[Cu+2]

Properties
Chemical formula	Cu(C_{11}H_{23}COO)_{2}
Molar mass	462.16
Appearance	Light blue solid
Solubility in water	Insoluble
- Except where otherwise noted, data are given for materials in their standard state (at 25 °C [77 °F], 100 kPa). Infobox references

Copper(II) laurate is a metal-organic compound with the chemical formula Cu(C_{11}H_{23}COO)_{2}. It is a light blue solid that does not dissolve in water. It is classified as a metallic soap, i.e. a metal derivative of a fatty acid. It is structurally related to copper(II) acetate.

Copper(II) laurate can be obtained by treating sodium laurate and copper sulfate in a warm aqueous solution.

== Additional reading ==
- Progress in Medicinal Chemistry. Elsevier. 22 September 2011. p. 458. ISBN 978-0-08-086274-3.
- Kharissova, Oxana V.; Irkha, Vladimir A.; Drogan, Ekaterina G.; Zagrebelnaya, Alena I.; Burlakova, Victoria E.; Shcherbakov, Igor N.; Popov, Leonid D.; Uflyand, Igor E. (1 March 2021). "Copper-Containing Nanomaterials Derived from Copper(II) Laurate as Antifriction Additives for Oil Lubricants". Journal of Inorganic and Organometallic Polymers and Materials. 31 (3): 934–944. doi:10.1007/s10904-020-01855-5. ISSN 1574-1451. S2CID 230113187.*Godquin-Giroud, A.M.; Marchon, J.C.; Guillon, D.; Skoulios, A. (1 January 1984). "Discotic mesophase of copper(II) laurate". Journal de Physique Lettres. 45 (13): 681-684. doi:10.1051/jphyslet:019840045013068100.
