= Lara Vapnyar =

Russian-American author (born 1975)

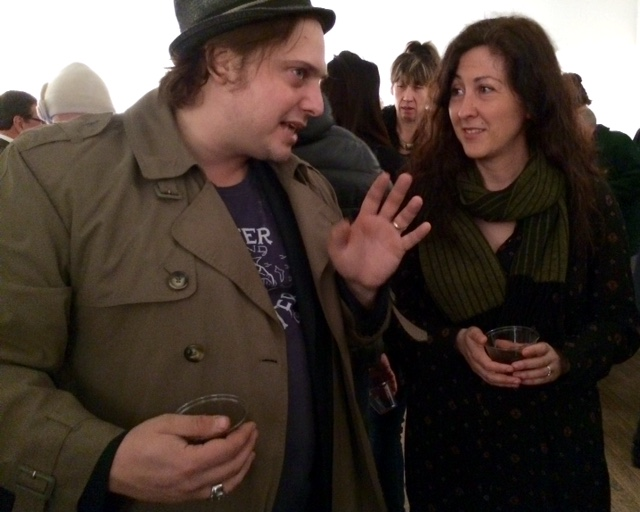
- Daniel Genis talks with Lara Vapnyar at the Vitaly Komar gallery opening
- Born: 1975 (age 50–51); Moscow, USSR
- Occupation: Novelist
- Writing career
- Period: Contemporary
- Notable works: The Scent of Pine, There Are Jews in My House

Lara Vapnyar (born 1975) is a Russian-American writer currently living in the United States. She studied comparative literature at CUNY and worked with André Aciman and Louis Menand.

Vapnyar has published four novels and two collections of short stories. Her work has also appeared in The New Yorker, Harper’s Magazine, Open City (magazine), and Zoetrope: All Story.

== Life ==
Vapnyar spent the first 19 years of her life in Moscow, where she earned a degree in Russian Language and Literature. Her mother was a professor of math education. In 1998, pregnant, she moved to the United States and later settled on Staten Island with her husband.

Though Vapnyar's husband and relatives found employment in the U.S. relatively easily, Vapnyar was unable to find a job. Feeling lonely and alienated, Vapnyar began to write stories in English. She was first published in 2002.

In 2011 Vapnyar received a Guggenheim Fellowship. ] and serves as a creative writing professor at Columbia University.

== Work ==
Vapnyar has been consistently associated by critics with an emerging group of young, Russian-American authors who, in addition to writing exclusively in English, share a “preoccupation with questions of cultural identity, adaptation and assimilation, and nostalgia." Along with Vapnyar, this group includes writers such as David Bezmozgis, Boris Fishman, Olga Grushin, Irina Reyn, Maxim D. Shrayer, Anya Ulinich, Gary Shteyngart and others, all of whom immigrated to the United States and Canada from the former USSR as children or young people.

Because of their shared interest in articulating the immigrant experience in a nonnative language, Vapnyar and her literary cohorts are frequently called “translingual,” and explore “what it means to be a Russian writer with a hyphen." Thus, the trend for recent Russian-American authors is not to depict “immigrants on their way to ultimate assimilation…[but instead] to present themselves as partially alienated strangers” for a distinctly American audience.

On the one hand, authors have “addressed the pitfalls of writing about one's country of origin for a foreign audience." For example, in “The Writer as Tour Guide,” Vapnyar “reports that a reader, who was himself a Russian immigrant, told her that her books made him uncomfortable because they were so obviously written with an American audience in mind." On the other hand, depicting “North American contexts from the perspective of a Russian newcomer” allows the authors to effectively communicate the alienating experience of immigration and to help them establish their own translingual, transcultural identities. This last point, that the act of creative writing is cathartic and formative, is especially true for Vapnyar, who has wondered (in interviews) whether she would have learned to feel at ease in the United States without writing fiction in English. For Vapnyar, creative writing is her primary “means of establishing her identity in her adopted homeland."

Vapnyar’s reliance on creative writing as a means to form her own identity is reflected in her frequent use of a trope—common to all the Fourth Wave writers—that has been defined as the “self-portrait of the author as a translingual and transcultural storyteller." This trope is essentially an act of parody, where novels and short stories produced by the group present protagonists that are authors or storytellers themselves, spending the majority of the narratives explaining their Soviet lives to American characters. In doing so, Vapnyar is able to “symbolically enact...[her] own role as a self-exoticising translingual writer who presents her culture of origin to an audience of American readers.”

Three of Vapnyar's books have appeared in Russian, although she did not participate in their translation.

== Bibliography ==
=== Novels ===
- Vapnyar, Lara (2006). Memoirs of a muse. New York: Vintage.
- 2014: The Scent of Pine: A Novel (Simon & Schuster)
- 2016: Still Here: A Novel (Hogarth)
- 2019: Divide Me By Zero: A Novel (Tin House Books)

=== Short fiction ===
Collections

- 2003: There Are Jews in My House (Anchor)
- 2008: Broccoli and Other Tales of Food and Love (Anchor)

Stories (Note: Short stories unless otherwise noted.)

| Title | Year | First published | Reprinted/collected | Notes |
|---|---|---|---|---|
| Waiting for the miracle | 2016 | Vapnyar, Lara (April 25, 2016). "Waiting for the miracle". The New Yorker. 92 (11): 80–85. | | |
| Deaf and blind | 2017 | Vapnyar, Lara (April 24, 2017). "Deaf and blind". The New Yorker. 93 (10): 82–87. | | |

=== Nonfiction ===
- 2008: “The Writer as Tour Guide” in The Writer Uprooted: Contemporary Jewish Exile Literature, edited by Alvin H. Rosenfeld (Indiana University Press): 92-105

—————
