= Gubkin (disambiguation) =

Gubkin is a town in Belgorod Oblast, Russia. Gubkin may also refer to:

- FC Gubkin, an association football club base in Gubkin
- Gubkin (surname)
- Gubkin Russian State University of Oil and Gas in Moscow, Russia
