= Saint Irene =

Saint Irene may refer to:

- Irene of Thessalonica, one of three virgin sisters killed in 304, feast day April 3
- Irene of Rome (died c. 288), wife of martyr Saint Castulus, feast day January 22, she attended to Saint Sebastian
- Saint Irene (Great Martyr) (Irene of Macedonia; Irene of Lecce) feast day May 5
- Irene of Egypt (3rd century), killed with Sophie of Egypt (ru)
- Irene of Tomar (died c. 653), of Portugal, feast day October 20
- Irene of Athens (8th century) empress
- Irene of Cappadocia (9th century) abbess, feast day July 28 in Eastern Orthodox churches
- Irene of Hungary, empress (died 1134), feast day August 13 in Eastern Orthodox churches
- Hagia Irene church in Istanbul is often called "St Irene", although it is actually named after the "Holy (Divine) Peace"

== See also ==
- Irene (disambiguation)
- Irina
- Santorini
- Santarém, Portugal
- Santarém, Pará
- Santa Iria de Azoia
- Póvoa de Santa Iria
