= Zhdanovich =

Zhdanovich or Zdanovych (Жданович) is an East Slavic gender-neutral patronymic surname derived from the pre-Christian Slavic given name Zhdan (Ждан). Notable people with the surname include:

- Irina Zhdanovich, Soviet and Belarusian actress
- Oleksii Zhdanovych, Ukrainian footballer
- Viktor Zhdanovich, Soviet and Russian fencer

== See also ==
- Zhdanovichy
- Zdanovich
- Zhdanov
