= Gubkin (surname) =

Gubkin (masculine, Russian: Губкин) or Gubkina (feminine, Russian: Губкина) is a Russian surname. It originates from the noun guba, which literally means a lip and in a Russian slang refers to a stubborn person. Notable people with the surname include:

- Irina Gubkina (born 1972), Russian luger
- Ivan Gubkin (1871–1939), Russian geologist
- Lyudmila Gubkina (born 1973), Belarusian hammer thrower
