= Irina (disambiguation) =

Irina is a feminine given name.

Irina may also refer to:

== Geography ==
- Irina, a small river in Romania, tributary of the Rătășel
- Irina, Madagascar, a town and commune in Ihorombe Region, Madagascar
- Irina, a village in Andrid Commune, Satu Mare County, Romania
- Irina or Hirina, an ancient city, former bishopric and Latin Catholic titular see in present Tunisia

== Music ==
- Irina, an album by the Barry Altschul Quartet

== Other uses ==
- Irina: The Vampire Cosmonaut, a Japanese novel series and its anime adaptation
- Irina, a fictional character from the video game Xenoblade Chronicles X
- MSC Irina, one of the world's largest container ships
