= Irina Perminova =

Russian chemist (born 1960)

Perminova, Irina Vasilievna
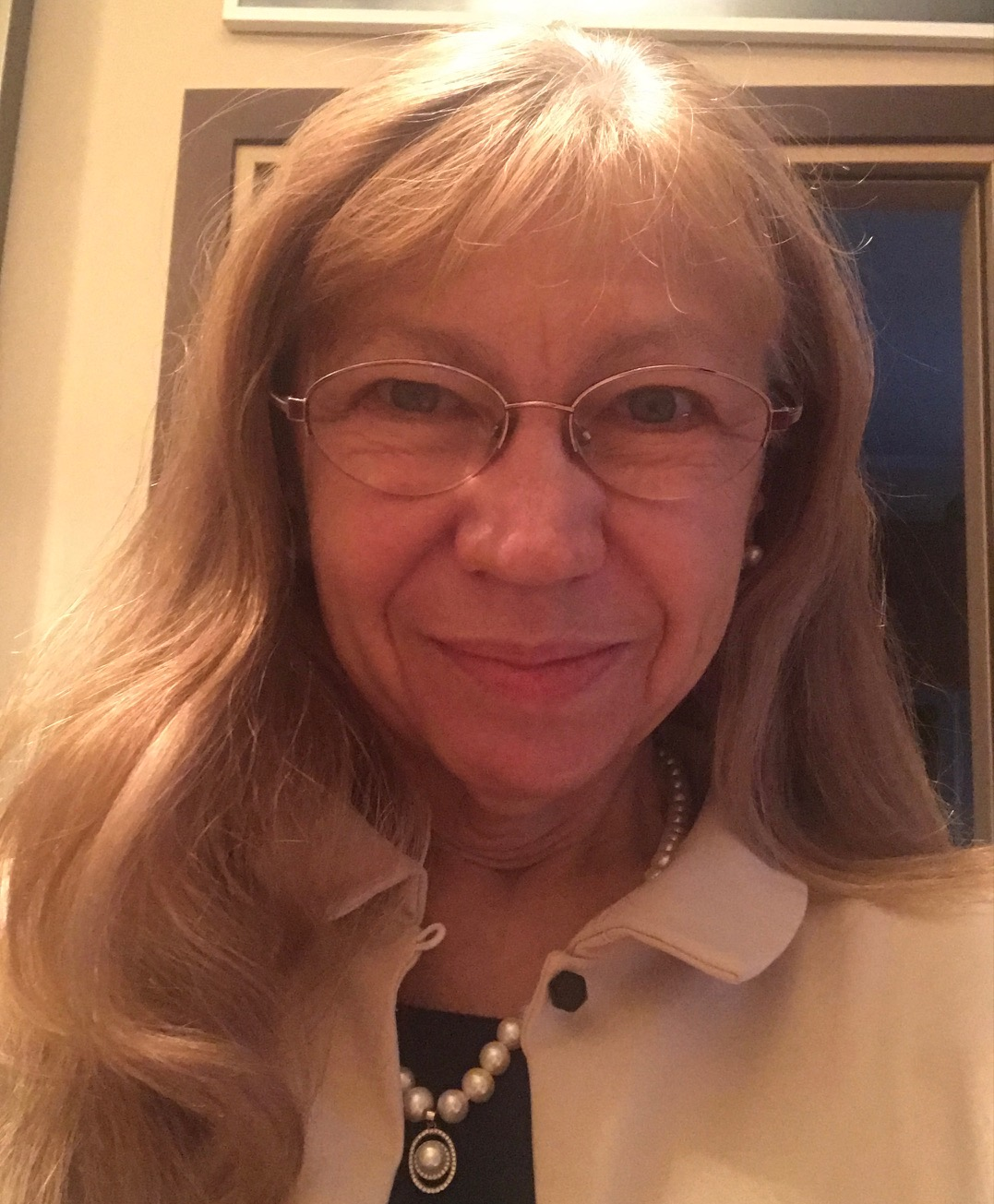
- Perminova Irina Vasilievna
- Born: 9 February 1960; Dzhambul city, Kazakhstan
- Education: Moscow University
- Occupations: Chemist, Professor, Chief Scientist
- Spouse: Reiner Braun
- Parents: Vasily Stepanovich Perminov (1928-2017) (father); Lydia Yakovlevna Perminova (maiden name – Kopach) (1927-2014) (mother)

Irina Vasilievna Perminova (born 9 February 1960) is a Russian scientist, Professor, Dr. Habil. in Analytical Chemistry, Chief Scientist, Head of the Laboratory of Natural Humic Systems at the Division of Medicinal Chemistry and Fine Organic Synthesis of the Department of Chemistry of the Moscow University, Moscow, Russia

== Biography ==
Irina V. Perminova was born in the city of Dzhambul (nowadays, - Taraz) located in the Southern Kazakhstan, in the family of engineers. Her mother – Lydia Yakovlevna Perminova (maiden name – Kopach) (1927–2014), born in the Makovka village, the Novo-Vasilyevsky District, the Zaporozhye Region (Ukraine Republic of the USSR) – graduated with honors from the Dnepropetrovsk Institute of Chemical Technology in 1951, and worked since 1951 until 1976 at the Dzhambul Chemical Plant as a Head of the Central Plant Laboratory. Her father – Vasily Stepanovich Perminov (1928–2017), born in the Bolshoe Korkovo village, Pavinsky District, Kostroma Region (the Russian Federal Republic of the USSR) – graduated from the technical engineering college, served in the navy, worked in Dzhambul since 1953 at the different positions including a Director of Dzhambul Power Plant #3. Her elder sister – Larisa Vasilyevna Zernova (maiden name – Perminova), born in 1956, lives and works in Moscow, same as her husband Vladimir Zernov, and two sons – Yury and Anton Zernovs.

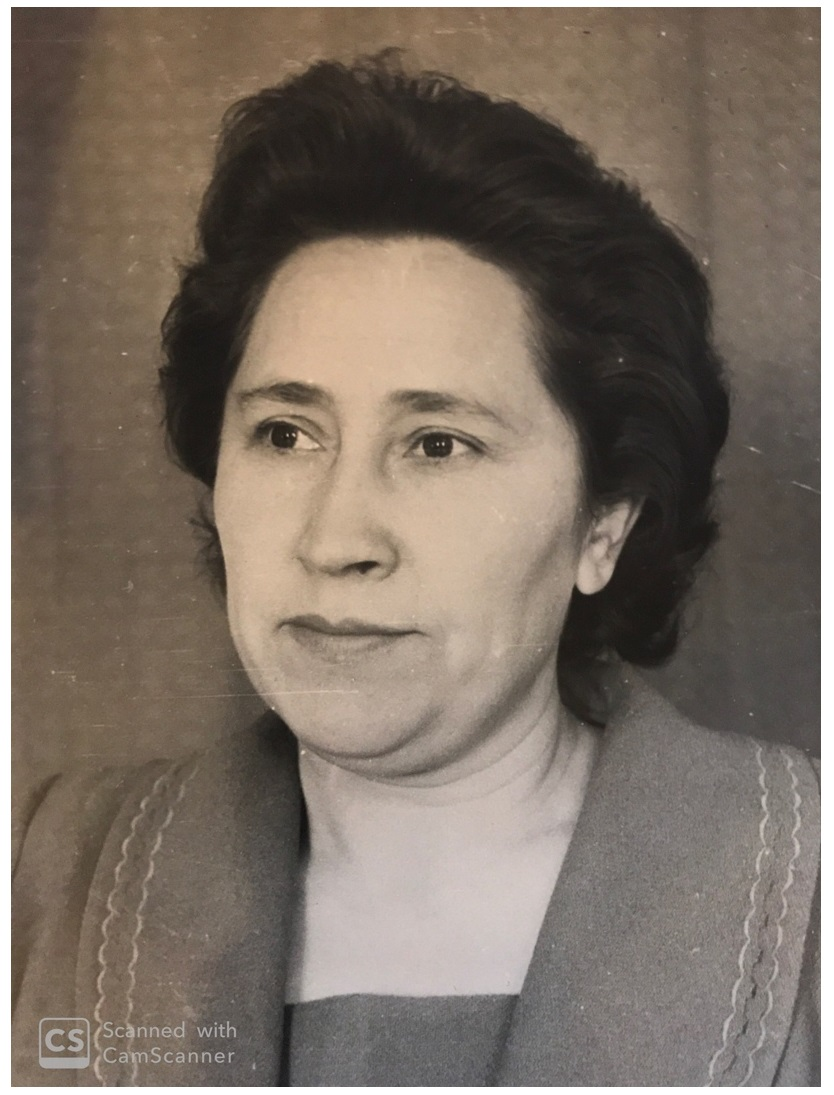
Lydia Yakovlevna Perminova (1927–2014)

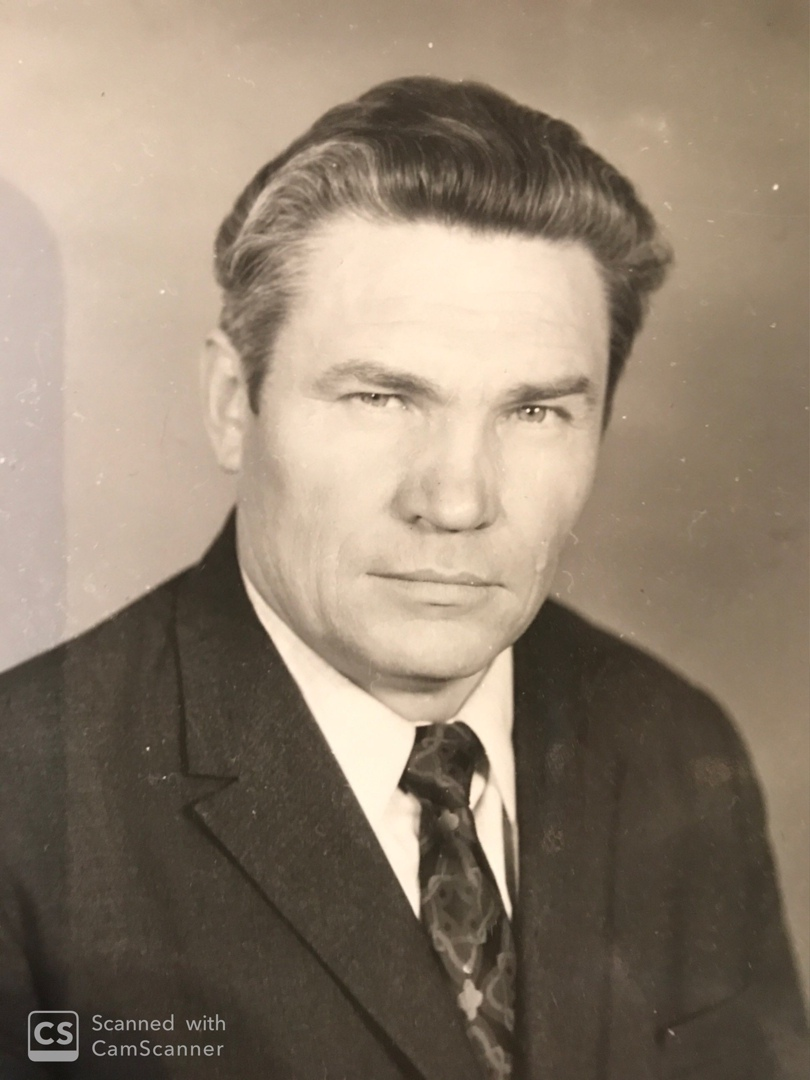
Vasily Stepanovich Perminov (1928–2017)

Irina Perminova studied at the School #7 named after K.E. Tsiolkovsky in Dzhambul. The school had in depth education in Chemistry and, mostly thanks to the efforts of Lydia Perminova, Irina's mother, the school received a unique chemical classroom and laboratory equipped with everything necessary for conducting chemical experiments – a donation from the Dzhambul Superphosphate Plant to School #7. Despite that, during her school years, Irina was more interested in Mathematics than in Chemistry. This continued until her participation in the Kazakh Republican Chemistry Olympiad in 1976 in Karaganda. There, she met the teachers from the Department of Chemistry of the Lomonosov Moscow State University, nominally, Vladimir Valentinovich Sorokin. This meeting determined her decision to enter the Department of Chemistry of the MSU. In 1976 the Perminoves’ family moved to Gomel (Belorussian Republic of the USSR), where Irina graduated from the school with honors in 1977 and entered the Department of Chemistry of the MSU shortly after that.

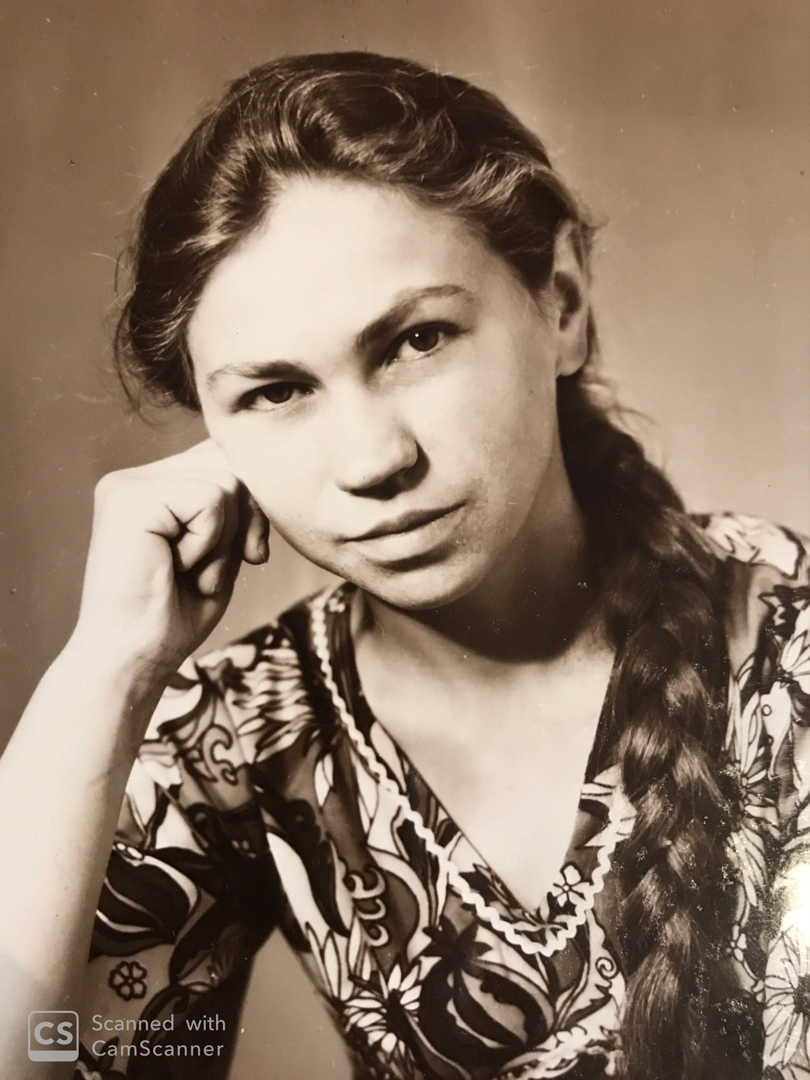
Irina Vasilievna at the age of 17

She graduated from the Department of Chemistry Cum Laude in 1982, and continued her studies in the graduate school at the Division of Analytical Chemistry of the Lomonosov MSU until 1985. She defended her PhD in 1987.

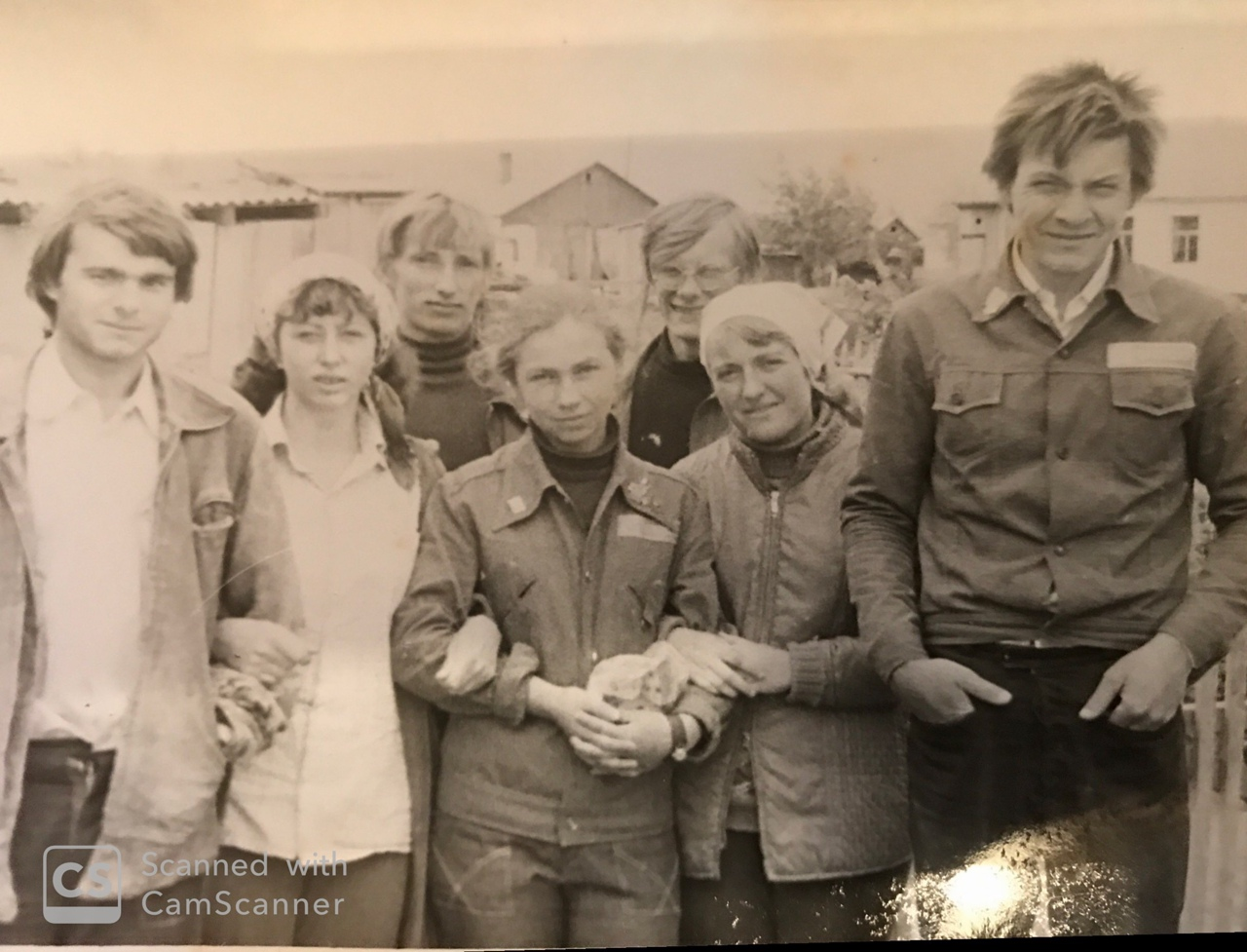
Student years (Irina Vasilievna in the center)

== Scientific career ==
The scientific research of Irina Perminova since the student years and until today has been devoted to the study of humic substances. This research direction was proposed to her in 1981 by the scientific advisors of her diploma work – Elena Konstantinovna Ivanova, Associate Professor, Ph.D., and Tatiana Vladimirovna Polenova, Assistant Professor, Ph.D., who accepted proposal of Dr. Sergey Methodievich Chernyak, Senior Researcher at the State Oceanographic Institute, to start research collaboration in the field of assessment of the role of humic substances in determination of pesticides in natural waters. This proposal has determined the further scientific path of Perminova. It started with isolation of humic substances from natural waters. To solve this problem, Irina organized her students’ detachment (Kazakhstan-7) for sampling and delivery of 200 liters of water from the pond on the Lenin Hills located a couple of kilometers from the Department of Chemistry. In 1982 Irina Perminova defended her diploma entitled "Studies of the mutual interference in the analysis of organic substances of natural and anthropogenic origin in the marine and fresh waters" at the Division of Analytical Chemistry. She continued her research at the graduate school and in 1987 defended her PhD thesis entitled "Determination of fulvic acids in natural waters". By that time, she was already an employee of the Laboratory of Monitoring of the Environment and Ocean (LAM of the State Committee for Hydrometeorology and the USSR Academy of Sciences, which was transformed in 1991 into the Institute of Global Climate and Ecology), where she began her career in 1986 under the supervision of Dr. Sergey M. Chernyak. As a young researcher of LAM, in 1988 she was fortunate to join the Soviet-American cruise under BerPac Project, which was devoted to studies of subarctic and subequatorial ecosystems under conditions of global climate change. The cruise has completely changed Irina's ideas about the role of humic substances in the World Ocean: it became more and more evident that humics represent an ecosystem metabolite. They can be considered as a molecular marker of the global climate change. She published the paper on distribution of humic substances in the ecosystem of the Bering Sea. This was the first work of this kind on the marine humics. Another important outcome of the cruise was established connections with the U.S. scientists.

After the cruise, Irina Perminova started actively participating in the Soviet-American meetings within the IPCC (Intergovernmental Panel on Climate Change). These activities made her go for in-depth studies of the carbon cycle and brought about understanding the humic substances as a flow of the conservative organic carbon. She participated in two more international cruises – in 1991 and 1993, which confirmed the validity of assumptions about the important role of humic substances as a marker of global climatic processes in the ocean. In 1991 she accepted an invitation of Professor Valery Samsonovich Petrosyan and returned to her alma mater in the capacity of the Senior Researcher at the Division of Organic Chemistry. Unfortunately, this event coincided with the end of the Soviet Union. The state funding of science almost completely stopped. And again, Irina's mother helped the young scientific group to survive by sending the large package of necessary chemical glassware and reagents from the Gomel Superphosphate Plant, where she was working, to the Department of Chemistry of the Lomonosov MSU. At the MSU, Irina Perminova focused her research on three areas: firstly, on the studies of structure and molecular organization of humic substances, secondly, on the study of binding and detoxifying properties of humics in relation to heavy metals, polycyclic aromatic hydrocarbons, and pesticides, and, thirdly, on the search for descriptors and numerical methods for describing the structure of humic substances to build predictive "structure – property" relationships. In the course of these studies, seven PhD theses were defended under her supervision: Danchenko N.N. (1997), Anisimova M.A. (1997), Kovalevsky D.V. (1998), Zhilin D.M. (1998), Kulikova N.A. (1999), Grechishcheva N.Yu. (2000), Kholodov V.A. (2003). A vast data set on structure and properties of humic substances was obtained, which formed the factual basis of her Dr. Habil. dissertation. Irina Perminova defended Dr. Habil. Dissertation in Analytical Chemistry entitled "Analysis, classification and prediction of the properties of humic acids"[6] in 2000 at the Department of Chemistry of the Lomonosov MSU. In this work for the first time the methodological principles of quantitative analysis of humic substances in terms of composition were formulated using determination of elemental, structural-group and molecular-mass composition, as well as a method of generation of numerical descriptors of structure in terms of integral composition descriptors at the elemental, group and molecular level. For the first time, the legitimacy of the reproducibility ideal for humic systems was experimentally proven: this showed that humics represent typified system with the predictable lines of evolution. In this direction, the first papers were published in the number one journal in the field of Environmental Chemistry – Environmental Science and Technology. The result of the generalization of works on the ecological chemistry of humic substances was a monograph published in 2005 in the Springer publishing house entitled: "Use of Humic Substances to Remedy Polluted Environments: from theory to practice", where Irina Perminova became the editor-in-chief. In the same monograph, her seminal review article was published: "Remediation Chemistry of Humic Substances" co-authored with Kirk Hatfield from the University of Florida (USA).

In 2006 Irina Perminova was awarded the title of Professor in Ecology (Chemical Sciences).

The further subject of her scientific research was the directed design of humic derivatives with tailored properties including incorporation of redox units with the given redox properties and incorporation of silanol groups. The major application field for the humic derivatives was environmental remediation including their use as mediators of redox processes and as adhesive agents when installing permeable reaction barriers. The results of this research laid grounds for three defended PhD theses: Karpyuk L.A. (2008), Shcherbina N.A. (2009), Volikov A.B. (2016), and numerous publications. Simultaneously, she continued fundamental research in the field of molecular organization of humic substances using NMR spectroscopy and Fourier Transform Ion Cyclotron Resonance Mass Spectrometry (FT ICR MS) in collaboration with Drs. Philippe Schmitt-Kopplin and Norbert Hertkorn from the Helmholtz Center for Environmental Protection and Health (Munich, Germany) and with the group of Prof. E.N. Nikolaev (Semenov Institute of Energy Problems of Chemical Physics, SkolTech). This research resulted in a PhD thesis by Alexander Zherebker defended in 2017, and a series of publications. Of particular importance are results of the IUPAC project initiated by Irina Perminova on the intercalibration studies of the molecular composition of humic substances as determined by FTICR MS published in the IUPAC journal - Pure and Applied Chemistry.

In 2015 the new Division of Medical Chemistry and Fine Organic Synthesis was formed at the Department of Chemistry of the Lomonosov MSU as a spring off of the Organic Chemistry Division. As a result, Perminova's group started working at this new Division in the field of Medicinal Chemistry. In recognition of scienitifc achievements of her research group, academician N.S. Zefirov pleaded in front of the Scientific Council of the Department of Chemistry of the Lomonosov MSU for creating a Laboratory of Natural Humic Systems. This suggestion was supported by the Scientific Council of the Lomonosov MSU and in September 2017 the Laboratory of Natural Humic Systems (NHS) became a structural unit of the Department of Chemistry of the Lomonosov MSU.

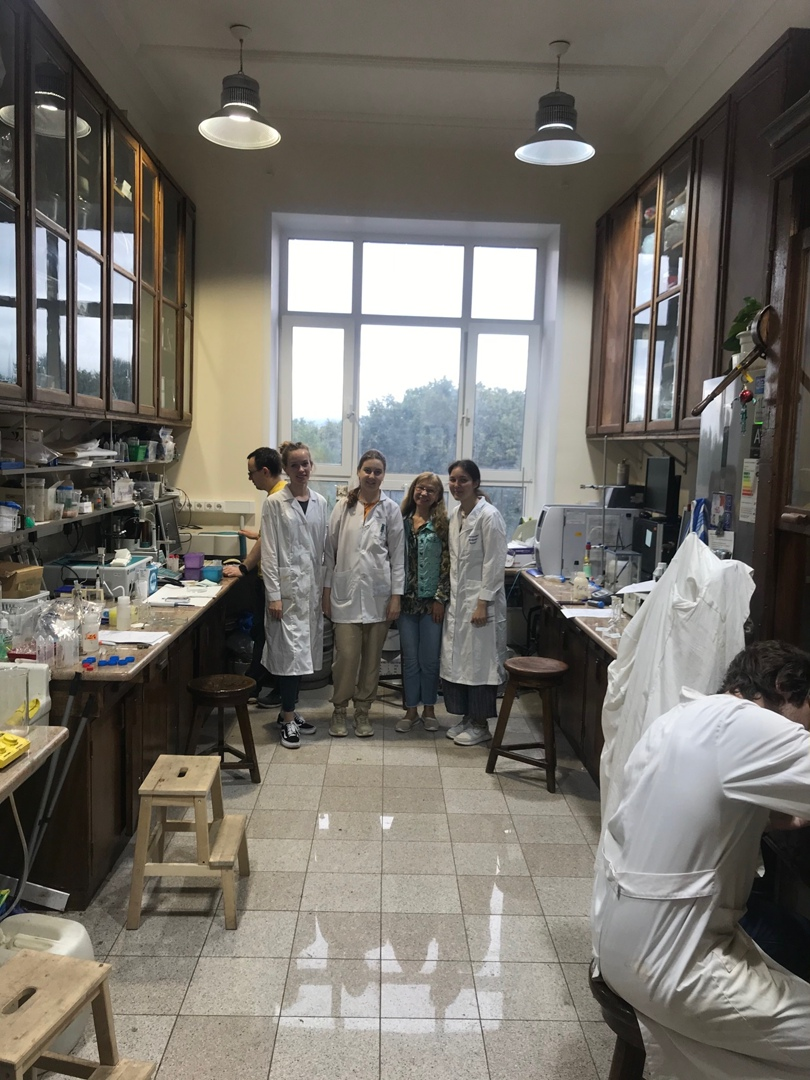
Laboratory of natural humic systems

The new scientific directions of the newly opened Laboratory included antibiotic resistance research in part of the development of inhibitors of beta-lactamases based on the biological activity guided fractionation of humic substances, combating multiple resistance of viruses – the development of antiviral humic drugs. Another idea of combating antibiotic resistance with the help of humic substances considers them as combinatorial packaging. Incorporation of the old antibiotics into the matrix of humic substances might lead to the restoration of antibiotic sensitivity in different bacterial strains. Another topic of long-term research is the synthesis of metal nanoparticles and metal oxides stabilized by the matrix of humic substances. The research includes such biologically active metals as Ag, Au, Zn, Fe. PhD thesis by T.A. Sorkina (2014) was defended on the topic of preparing iron (hydr)oxides stabilized by humic substances and their use as microfertilizers and ferrofluids. A whole series of publications came out of this research. At the moment, the Perminova's Group actively works on development of new nanobiomaterials for wound healing of infected wounds: an interdisciplinary complex project of the Russian Scientific Foundation #20-63-47070 in cooperation with the research Group of Profs. Michail V. Belousov and Maria V. Zykova from the Siberian State Medical University (Tomsk, Russia). Still another hot-spot topic of the research is the study of structure and optical properties of the natural organic matter (NOM) in the Arctic ecosystems, in particular, in the Kolyma, Ob and Enisey Rivers basins. In 2020–2022, three cruises of the research vessel "Academician Mstislav Keldysh" led by Corr. Member of RAS Dr. Igor P Semiletov were attended by the members of the Perminova's Group. The research is conducted jointly with Dr. Evgeny Shirshin's Group from the Department of Physics of the LMSU who focuses on development of theory of oprtical properties of humic substances. A series of papers on this topic has been published.

Thus, both Environmental Chemistry and Medicinal Chemistry of humic systems have now merged into the research subject of the Laboratory. This gave rise to formulation of the new concept in Chemistry, nominally, emergence of Eco-adaptive Chemistry and Technology. Ecoadaptive Chemistry can be defined as a field of science aimed at both studying the molecular mechanisms of the sustainable functioning of open biogeochemical systems and at their reproduction by creating naturelike structures, materials, technical devices and technological processes. This concept was published in the IUPAC journal - PAC in 2019 - under the title "From green chemistry and nature-like technologies to ecoapadtive chemistry and technologies". This concept was realized in full in 2020, when the Perminova's Lab developed the technology of in situ washing of soils contaminated with diesel fuel during the accident in Norilsk. The technology was approved for use by the State Ecological Expertise Committee of the Russian Agency for Environmental Protection Control (Rosprirodnadzor). The successful development of this technology motivated the Norilsk Nickel Group to initiate two more projects dedicated to implementation of the approved in situ surface washing technology in the field and to development of sorbents and meliorants for “red rivers” and “red soils” of the Norilsk Industrial Region aimed for removal of the hematite pollution. The plans for the future are to go from the end of pipe solutions (such as sorbents and meliorants), which were proposed by the Perminova's Lab to the Nornickel Group to development of process integrated solutions implying elimination of the source of the pollution at the metallurgical plant. The future goal is also to bring new humics-based bionanomaterials for wound healing to the stage of clinical testing. The plans include development of beta lactamase inhibitors based on narrow fractions of humic substances. The ongoing fundamental research tasks include development of chemical definition of humic substances as a class of stochastic supramolecular systems of natural complex matter (IUPAC Project 2021-032-3-600), working out the concept of numerical description of the structure of humic substances, development of statistical theory of humification, studies on molecular organization of humic substances using ultra–high resolution mass spectrometry and machine learning as a basis for developing humic materials with predicted properties. There are also plans to write a textbook on the Chemistry of Natural Humic Systems and to discuss the new curricula for Organic Chemistry Courses which would include Chemistry of Humic Systems.

== Participation in the scientific conferences ==
In 1993, Irina Perminova organized the Interdepartmental Scientific Group of the Lomonosov MSU "MGUMUS"». The group includes employees, postgraduates and students of five departments of the Lomonosov MSU (Department of Chemistry, Department of Soil Science, Department of Biology, Department of Physics, Department of Materials Sciences) with a weekly scientific seminar "Chemistry of Humic Systems", which has been functioning since 1993 to the present. As a part of the MGUMUS group, an Interdisciplinary seminar of the Lomonosov MSU was held in 2013 under the title "At the Cross-Section of Sciences and Ideas, which gathered the scientists from six departments of MSU and Institutes of the Russian Academy of Sciences. Irina Perminova is a member of a number of organizing committees of the International conferences organized by the International Humic Substances Society (IHSS) and its regional and national chapters. She was an invited speaker at these and other international conferences In 2008, Irina Perminova initiated the 14th International IHSS Conference in Russia, which took place on board the ship cruising from Moscow to St. Petersburg. More than 300 people took part in the conference. The success of this conference inspired Irina Perminova to organize conferences on humic innovative technologies (HIT) under the auspices of the CIS Chapter of IHSS and the Lomonosov Moscow State University. The first conference was held in 2010 at the Lomonosov MSU, and since then they were held on the biannual basis. In 2019 the Fifth anniversary conference of the CIS IHSS HIT-2019 was held, which was attended by more than 200 people from 16 countries. The last HIT-2022 conference took place on Nov 18-21, 2022 in the sailing club Vodnik (Moscow Region) under the title “Humic Systems for Technologies of Resilience”.

== Memberships in scientific societies ==
Irina V. Perminova is the acting President of the International Humic Substances Society (IHSS) for the term 2022–2024. Irina V. Perminova was a Coordinator of the CIS Chapter of IHSS from 2002 until 2021. She is a past-coordinator of the CIS IHSS. She has been a member of the International Humic Society (IHSS) since 1994. Irina V. Permiova is a titular member of International Union of Pure and Applied Chemistry (IUPAC), Division VI "Chemistry and the Environment", for the term 2022–2023. She was also a titular member of IUPAC in 2017–2019, and Associate Member in 2020–2021.

== Educational activities ==
From 1991 to 1994 Irina Perminova lectured at the Open Ecological University on the subject of "Environmental Chemistry and Toxicology” Since 2017, she has been teaching the course "Environmental Chemistry" for the Master-students of the Department of Chemistry of the Lomonosov MSU In 2022, Irina V. Perminova prepared a new course “From natural supramolecues to supracolloids” for the master students. In 2022, Irina V. Perminova initiated establishment of new educational trajectory at the Department of Chemistry entitled “Ecological Chemistry and Ecoadaptive technologies”. The students of the Department of Chemistry can choose this trajectory as a specialty Chemist-ecologist”. Since 2016 she teaches the Interdepartmental course "Chemistry of natural organic matter and nature-like technologies" Under the supervision of Irina V. Perminova were defended three Dr. Habil Theses: by V.A. Kholodov (2021), N.Y. Grechishchev (2017), and N.A. Kulikova (2008); thirteen Ph.D. theses: A.B. Volikov (2018), A. Y. Zherebker (2017), T.A. Sorkina (2014), N.S. Shcherbina (2009), L.A. Karpiouk (2008), Q.M Saleem (2004), V.A. Kholodov (2003), N.Y. Grechischeva (2000), N.A. Kulikova (1999), D.M. Zhilin (1998), D.V. Kovalevskii (1998), M.A. Anisimova (1997), N.N. Danchenko (1997) and 25 diploma works (equal to M.Sc. theses).

== Main works ==
Monography: Use of humic substances to remediate polluted environments: from theory to practice, Perminova I.V., Hatfield K., Hertkorn N. (Eds.), NATO Science Series: IV: Earth and Environmental Sciences, Vol. 52, 2005. Springer, Dordrecht, The Netherlands, pp 506. Chapters in monographs:

1. Perminova, I.V., S. N. Kalmykov, N.S. Shcherbina, S. A. Ponomarenko, V. A. Kholodov, A.P. Novikov, R.G. Haire, K. Hatfield. Humic Functional Derivatives and Nanocoatings for Remediation of Actinide Contaminated Environments. Chapter 29. In: Nanomaterials for Environmental Protection, Eds.: B.I. Kharisov, O.V. Kharissova, H. V. Rasika Dias. 2014 Blackwell Wiley Inc., New York. P. 483–502. ISBN 9781118496978.
2. Perminova, I.V., Gaspar, A., Ph. Schmitt-Kopplin, N.A. Kulikova, A.I. Konstantinov, N. Hertkorn, K. Hatfield. 2009. Separation technology as a powerful tool for unfolding molecular complexity of natural organic matter and humic substances. In: Biophysico-Chemical Processes Involving Natural Nonliving Organic Matter in Environmental Systems. N. Senesi and B. Xing (Eds.), IUPAC Book Series, Wiley, Chapter 13. P. 487–538.
3. Perminova, I.V., Kulikova, N.A., Zhilin, D.M., Grechischeva, N.Yu., Kovalevskii, D.V., et al. 2006. Mediating effects of humic substances in the contaminated environments. Concepts, results, and prospects. In: Viable Methods of Soil and Water Pollution Monitoring, Protection and Remediation. Twardowska, I., Allen, H.E., Haggblom, M.H., Stefaniak, S. (Eds.) NATO Science Series IV: Earth and Environmental Sciences, Springer, Dordrecht, the Netherlands, Vol. 69, pp. 249–274.
4. Perminova, I.V., and Hatfield, K. 2005. Remediation Chemistry of Humic Substances: Theory and Implications for Technology. In: Use of humic substances to remediate polluted environments: from theory to practice, Perminova I.V., Hatfield K., Hertkorn N. (Eds.), NATO Science Series: IV: Earth and Environmental Sciences, Vol. 52, Springer, Dordrecht, The Netherlands, pp. 3–36.
5. Perminova, I.V., Grechishcheva, N. Yu., Petrosyan, V.S., Anisimova M.A., Kulikova N.A., Lebedeva G.F., Matorin D.N. and Venediktov P.S. 2001. Impact of humic substances on the toxicity of xenobiotic organic compounds. Chapter 14. In: Humic Substances and Chemical Contaminants. SSSA, Madison, WI. Eds: M.H.B. Hayes, C.E. Clapp, N. Senesi, P.R. Bloom and P.M. Jardine. p. 275–287.
6. Perminova I.V., D.V. Kovalevsky, N.Yu. Yashchenko, N.N. Danchenko, A.V. Kudryavtsev, D.M. Zhilin, V.S. Petrosyan, N.A. Kulikova, O.I. Philippova, G.F. Lebedeva, 1996: Humic substances as natural detoxicants. In: Humic substances and organic matter in soil and water environments: characterization, transformations and interactions. Eds.: C.E. Clapp, M.H.B. Hayes, N. Senesi, S.M. Griffith. St. Paul, Minn., USA, 399–406

== Family ==
Husband is Reiner Braun, he lives and works in Germany, he is a journalist, historian, politician, a member of the International Peace Bureau (IPB).

== Interesting facts ==
In just one year, she learned English. As a student she sang in the choir and she was a commissar of the students’ detachment “Kazakhstan-7”. She plays the guitar and her most favorite hobby is traveling and meeting friends.
