= Farida Mansurova =

Tajikistani physician (1952–2021)

Farida Hamidovna Mansurova (Tajik: Фарида Ҳамидовна Мансурова; 2 May 1952 – 1 July 2021) was a Tajikistani physician and scientific researcher.

Born in Samarkand into a medical family, Mansurova is the daughter of Hamid Mansurov and Irina Mansurova. First educated in Russian schools between 1959 and 1969, she graduated from the Tajikistan State Medical Institute in 1975, and until 1977 interned in the Department of Internal Medicine of that institution. From 1977 until 1982 she was a Scientific Worker in the Division of Biochemistry of Medicine at the Scientific Institute of Gastroenterology; beginning in 1982 and continuing until January 2002, she headed the Biochemistry Division of the Tajikistan State Medical Institute.

Beginning on 1 February 2002, she served as the Assistant Director of the Research Institute of Gastroenterology, remaining in this role until 2010, when she began working in the laboratory of the Center for Biology and Applied Medicine. Mansurova, a member of the Tajikistan Academy of Sciences, has published fifteen papers over the course of her career, and over 235 scientific works in total, including three monographs.

Mansurova died from COVID-19 in 2021.
