= Irina Gribulina =

Russian singer (born 1953)

Irina Gribulina Ирина Евгеньевна Грибулина
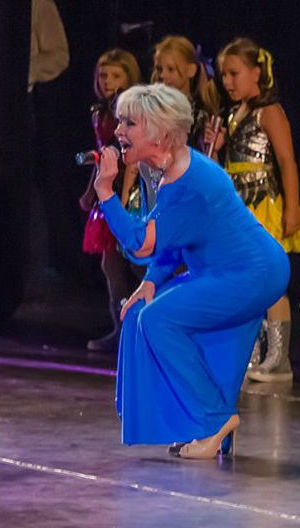
- Gribulina in 2013

Background information
- Born: Irina Yevgenevna Gribulina; September 29, 1953 (age 73); Sochi, RSFSR, Soviet Union
- Occupations: Singer, composer, poet

Irina Yevgenevna Gribulina (Russian: Ирина Евгеньевна Грибулина; born September 29, 1953, Sochi) is a Russian pop singer, composer, poet. She was the winner of the Television Festival Pesnya goda' 87.

== Early life ==
Gribulina was born September 29, 1953, in Sochi. Her mother was an operetta actress and singer in Sochi, and her father was journalist and writer. She has written poetry and music performed on stage Sochi native city.

In 1962 and 1972 she studied at the Central Music School at the Moscow Conservatory in the class of Dmitri Kabalevsky. From age 14 she began to act in a professional pop stage with well-known local artists those years.

== Career ==
After graduating from the conservatory Gribulina performed her own songs, and began working as a composer and a poet with many famous domestic singers and actors. The first performers of her songs were Valery Leontiev and Lyudmila Gurchenko.

Irina Gribulina is the author of music and poems to songs, hymns and musicals.

== Personal life ==
In 1996 Gribulina gave birth to a daughter, Anastasia.
