= Irina Azizyan =

Russian painter

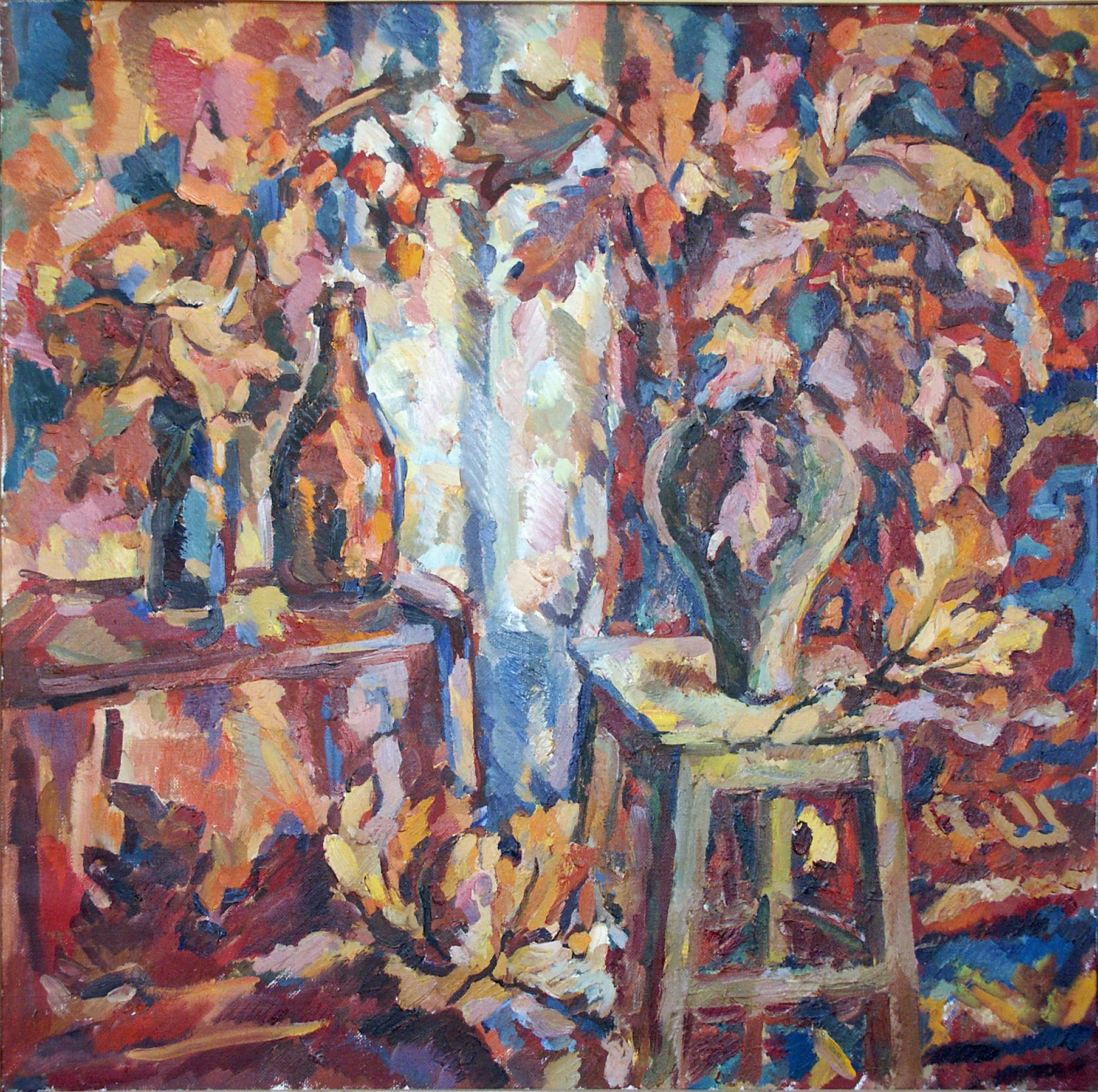
Red leaves, 1978

Irina Atykovna Azizyan (9 April 1935 - 22 June 2009 in Moscow) was a Russian painter and art critic of Armenian origin. Her work is in the collections of the State Museum of Oriental Art, the Shchusev Museum of Architecture, and the Vorontsov Palace Museum.

From 1968 to 1989, she worked at the Moscow Architectural Institute (MARCHI), where she taught “Introduction to Architectural Design” (1968–1970) and painting at the Department of Painting (1974–1989). From 1988, she headed the Department of Architectural Theory at the Research Institute of Theory and History of Architecture and Urban Planning of the Russian Academy of Architecture and Construction Sciences (NIITAG RAASN).

Works by I. Azizyan are held in the State Museum of Oriental Art, the Shchusev Museum of Architecture, the Alupka Palace Museum, and in private collections in Russia (Moscow, Saint Petersburg), Armenia (Yerevan), Romania, Spain, and the United States. In 2015, Azizyan was among nine 20th-century Armenian painters featured in the exhibition Temple of Peace at the State Museum of Oriental Art.
