= Irina Semenova (chess player) =

Uzbekistani chess player (born 1990)

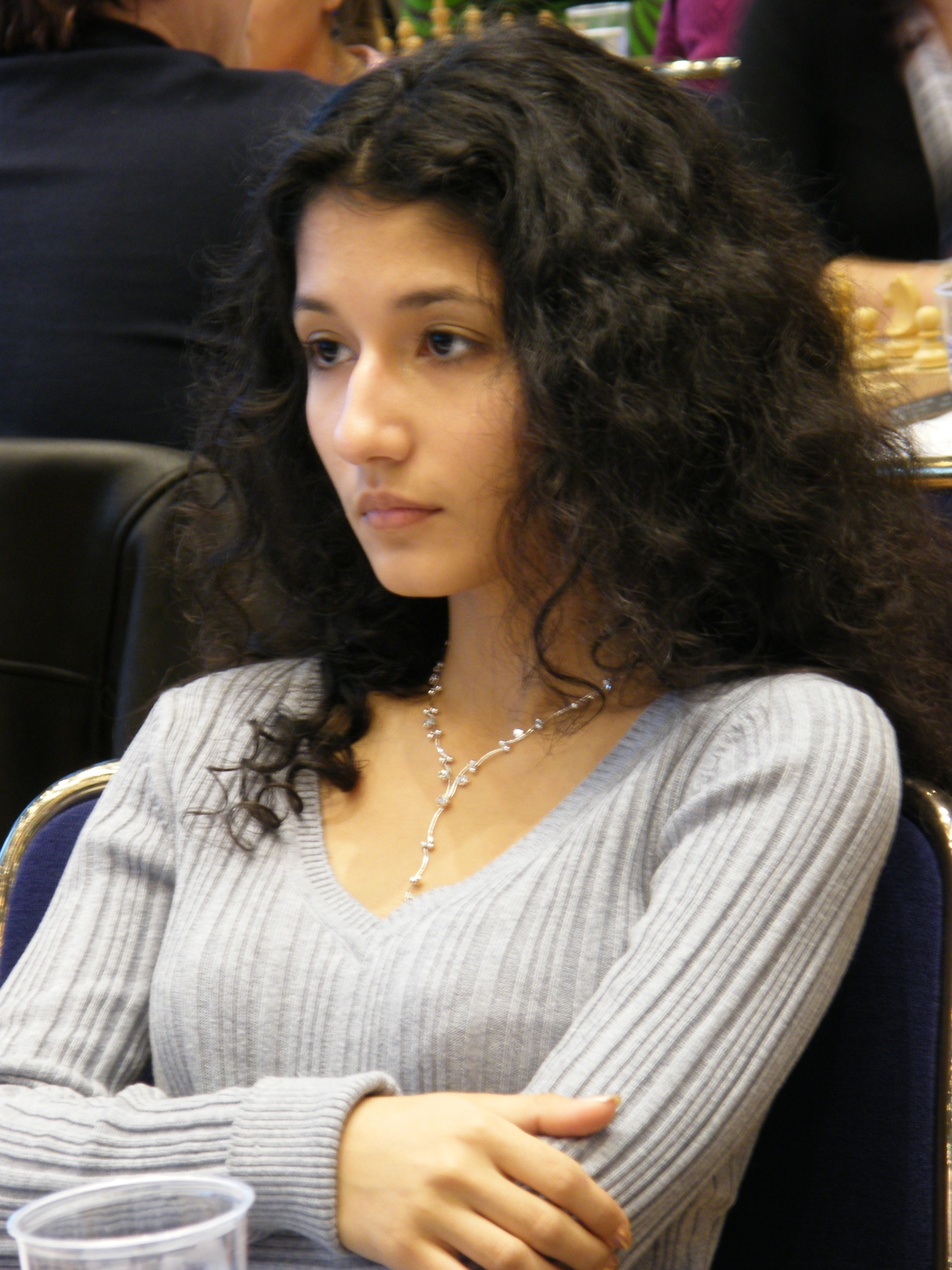

Personal information
- Full name: Irina Semenova (Gevorgyan)
- Born: 18 January 1990 (age 36) Tashkent, Uzbek SSR, Soviet Union

Chess career
- Country: Uzbekistan
- Title: Woman Grandmaster (2019)
- FIDE rating: 2160 (May 2021)
- Peak rating: 2324 (August 2016)
Medal record
Representing Uzbekistan
Asian Games
Gold medal – first place	2013 Tashkent	Team
Chess Zonal Tournament
Silver medal – second place	2015 Tashkent	Individual
Batumi Municipality Cup-2016
Gold medal – first place	2016 Batumi	Individual

Irina Semenova (Gevorgyan) (born 18 January 1990 in Tashkent) is an Uzbekistani chess player.

== Early life ==
Irina Semenova was born in Tashkent on January 18, 1990. She started learning to play chess at the age of six. Her first coach worked in the chess section of School No. 171, Andreyan Abdullaevich Mirzaahmedov. In 2006, she graduated from School No. 60 in Tashkent (now the State Specialized School No. 60 named after Johann Wolfgang von Goethe). In 2010, she completed her education at Tashkent State University of Economics. After finishing her university studies, Irina worked as a chess coach at a sports school in Tashkent for several years. Starting from 2014, she worked as the International Relations Manager for the Uzbekistan Chess Federation. In 2019, Irina Gevorgyan got married and adopted the Semenova family name.

== Career ==
In 2004, Irina Gevorgyan participated in her first international chess tournament.

In 2008, at the 38th Chess Olympiad held in Dresden, Germany, Irina Gevorgyan was part of the Uzbekistan women's team. She competed alongside Nafisa Muminova , Nodira Nodirjanova, Olga Sobirova, and Hulkar Toxirjanova. The Uzbekistan team performed moderately, securing the 22nd place in the overall standings. Irina Gevorgyan played nine games, winning four and drawing one. In the final individual ranking, she achieved the 34th position.

In 2012, at the 40th Chess Olympiad in Istanbul, Turkey, Irina Gevorgyan again represented Uzbekistan in the women's team. She played ten games, winning three and drawing four. In the final individual ranking, she secured the 41st place.

In October 2013, Irina Gevorgyan, alongside the Uzbekistan team, won the Central Asian Cup in chess.

During the 41st Chess Olympiad held in Tromsø, Norway, in 2014, Irina Gevorgyan was part of the Uzbekistan women's team. She played nine games, winning five and drawing two. In the final individual ranking, she achieved the 23rd position.

In 2015, Irina Gevorgyan won a silver medal at the Uzbekistan Chess Championship.

In 2016, at the 42nd Chess Olympiad held in Baku, Azerbaijan, Irina Gevorgyan represented Uzbekistan in the women's team. She played nine games, winning four and drawing three. In the final individual ranking, she secured the 20th place. In the same year, she earned a gold medal at the international chess festival "Batumi Municipality Cup-2016" in Batumi, Georgia.

In 2018, at the 43rd Chess Olympiad held in Batumi, Georgia, Irina Gevorgyan was part of the Uzbekistan women's team. She played ten games, winning four and drawing five. The Uzbekistan women's team secured the 17th place in the overall standings.

In 2020, Irina Semenova concluded her career.

== Achievements ==
Irina Semenova's Achievements in Chess:

- Women's FIDE Master among women (2006)
- Woman International Master (WIM) (2015)
- Women's Grandmaster (2019)
- FIDE Arbiter (2016)
- International FIDE Arbiter (2019).

== See also ==
- Nafisa Muminova
