= Irina Rubtsova =

Russian opera singer (born 1957)

Irina Pavlovna Rubtsova (born 1957) is a Moscow-born Russian soprano singer and Meritorious Artist who is a graduate of the Moscow Conservatory where she under guidance from Irina Arkhipova.

== Career ==
As a soloist she joined Bolshoi Theatre troupe in 1993 and by 1997 participated in Eugene Onegin opera in San Francisco where she was under direction from Yuri Temirkanov. In 1999, Rubtsova performed in Japan and next year appeared as Peronskaya in War and Peace at the Paris Opera. From 1999 to 2002 she worked at the Paris Opera and a year prior to her leave worked with James Conlon and Andrei Serban on Khovanshchina where she appeared in a role of Susanna. In 2003, she reprised her role in Eugene Onegin under conducting from Alexander Vedernikov. She also appeared in top roles in Tosca and Aida which were performed in Denmark and Cyprus respectively. Rubtsova is known for her musical festival appearances too especially when it comes to Verdi's works such as Aida and Nabucco where she played the main female character roles. She had a role of Abigaille from Nabucco at the May Opera Evenings in North Macedonia followed by Ochrid's music festival at the same place. She also had performances under such conductors as Marcello Panni and under whose guidance she was singing at the Ravenna Festival and later on traveled to England, South Korea, France, Germany, and Poland. Rubtsova also appeared at the Verdi Opera Music Festival in Graz, Austria, following by her trip thorough Central Asian republics such as Azerbaijan, Kazakhstan, Turkmenistan and Tatarstan.
