= Irina Rozovsky =

American photographer

- Born: 1981 (age 43–44); Moscow, Russia
- Occupation: Photographer
- Website: www.irinar.com

Irina Rozovsky (born 1981) is a Russian-born American photographer.

== Life and work ==
Rozovsky was born in Moscow. She studied at Massachusetts College of Art and Design in Boston, Massachusetts.

Island on my Mind was the winner of the Dummy Award for best unpublished photo book, at the 2014 Kassel Photo Book Festival.

== Books ==
- One to Nothing. Consortium, 2011. With a foreword by Ilya Kaminsky and an introduction by Jon Feinstein. ISBN 3868281991.
- Island on my Mind. Kettler, 2015. ISBN 978-3862064595.
- In Plain Air. London: Mack, 2021. ISBN 978-1913620172.
