= Irina Wrona =

German actress

Irina Wrona (born 1974 in Düsseldorf, Germany) is a German actress.

== Filmography ==
- 2016 Der Kriminalist – Die zwei Tode des Igor Dovgal, role: Letizia Marangiu
- 2013 Herbstflattern (completed), role: Ulrike Gutmann
- 2009 Romeo und Jutta (TV Movie), role: Braut Irina
- 2009 Mondscheinsonate, role: Karen
- 2025 Im Schatten der Bilder, role: Stephanie Hollenstein
