= Irina Crasnoscioc =

Moldovan-Russian basketball player

Personal information
- Born: August 13, 1981 (age 45) Chișinău, Moldova
- Listed height: 1.91 m (6 ft 3 in)
- Position: Center

Career history
- 2004-2005: Baltiyskaia Zvezda
- 2005-2008: Dynamo Kursk
- 2008: Scuf Kiev
- 2008-2009: Club Sportiv Municipal Târgoviște
- 2009: Yuzhna Palmira
- 2009-2010: ZTE Zala Volan
- 2010-2011: Pallacanestro Pozzuoli
- 2011-2012: Geas Basket
- 2012-2013: ZTE NKK
- 2013: Northland Luleå
- 2013-2014: ASPTT Arras

Irina Crasnoscioc, married Michailova (born August 13, 1981) is a Moldovan-Russian female professional basketball player.
