= Iryna Kyrylina =

Ukrainian composer (1953–2017)

Iryna Kyrylina

Iryna Yakovlevna Kyrylina (Ukrainian: Ірина Яківна Кириліна; 25 March 1953 – 4 September 2017) was a Ukrainian composer. She was born in Dresden, Germany, and studied with R.I. Vereschagin at the Kyiv Musical College, and with M.V. Dremlyuga at the Kyiv Conservatory, graduating in 1977. After completing her studies, she taught at a Kyiv Music School and directed children’s choirs. Since 1982, she has worked as a full-time composer.

== Honors and awards ==
- Laureate of the Ukrainian Republican Komsomol M.Ostrovsky Prize (1988)
- Honored in Arts of Ukraine (1999)
- Winner of the Ukrainian President’s Prize (1999)
- First Prize International Puppet-Show Competition (1988)
- International Children’s Festival Prize (1993–1997)
- All-Ukrainian Radio Festival Song of the Year (1998–2001)

== Works ==
Kyrylina was among the first Ukrainians to compose song cycles for voice and orchestra. She also writes stage music, often incorporating Ukrainian songs into her compositions. Selected works include:

- Chamber Cantata no.1 ‘Iz zvyozdnogo kovsha’ (From the Starry Ladle) (M. Tsvetayeva), Soprano, chamber ensemble, 1977
- Sonata, violin, piano, 1980
- Chamber Cantata no.3 ‘Znaki pamyati’ (Signs of Memory) (N. Turbina), Soprano, chamber orchestra, 1986
- Sinfonietta, 13 strings, 1987
- Chamber Cantata no.4 ‘Memoria’ (A. Akhmatova), Soprano, chamber ensemble, 1988
- 3 portreta (3 Portraits) (mono-op, L. Kostenko), Mezzo-soprano, chamber orchestra, 1988
- Chamber Cantata no.5 ‘Molitva’ (Prayer) (canonical texts), Soprano, chorus, orchestra, 1989
- Bagatelles, pianoforte, 1990
- Sax Quartet, 1990
- Raspad (Disintegration), chamber symphony., 1991
- Chamber Cantata no.6 ‘Kuznechik’ (The Grasshopper) (V. Khlebnikov), Soprano, clarinet, violin, pianoforte, 1992
- Rozmyte bachene (What I have Seen has been Washed Away) (cantata, P. Movchan), children's chorus, male chorus, organ, 1993
