= Irina Anurina =

Russian athlete

Personal information
- Full name: Ирина Дмитриевна Анурина
- Born: Irina Dmitrievna Anurina; April 11, 1999 (age 27) Kaluga

Sport
- Sport: Russian draughts
- Club: Checkers Russian (Kaluga)
- Coached by: Elena Anurina

Achievements and titles
- National finals: 2019 — Gold; 2017 — Silver; 2019 — Bronze

Irina Dmitrievna Anurina (Russian: Ирина Дмитриевна Анурина; born April 11, 1999, Kaluga) is a Russian draughts player, and a member of the Russian national team. Master of Sports of Russia (2015). Winner of the Russian championship in Russian drafts (2019).

== Biography ==
=== Sports career ===
Pupil of Sports school Checkers Russian in Kaluga.

In 2014 Women's Cup of Russia won a fast program and became the third in the classical program. At the Youth World Championship in checkers-64 in 2014, Irina won silver in a lightning game, bronze in quick checkers and silver in the classical program, all three awards in the age category from 14 to 16 years.

In the Russian championship of Russian checkers in 2017 won silver in the blitz program. In March 2019 Irina won the competition in the fast game and took the 3rd place in the lightning game.

=== Family ===
Mother Elena Anurina, she is Irina's coach. Father Dmitry Anurin, champion of Kaluga on Russian drafts.
