= Irina Zarutskaya =

Soviet geomorphologist, cartographer (1908–1990)

- Ирина Заруцкая
- Born: 12 November 1908
- Died: 2 February 1990 (aged 81)
- Education: Moscow State University
- Father: Pavel Zarutsky
- Scientific career
- Fields: Cartography, Geomorphology
- Workplaces: RAN Institute of Geography

Irina Pavlovna Zarutskaya (Russian: Ирина Павловна Заруцкая) (born 12 November 1908 in Moscow; died 2 February 1990 in Moscow) was a Soviet geomorphologist, cartographer and university professor. Most notably, she was editor-in-chief of the map production department during the creation of the 1:2,500,000 scale Hypsometric Map of the USSR.

== Biography ==
Zarutskaya was the daughter of the architect Pavel Zarutsky. At 17 she entered Moscow State University (MGU) in the Department of Soil Science, Geology and Geography of the Faculty of Physics and Mathematics. She graduated as a geomorphologist in 1931.

After her graduation, Zarutskaya carried out topographical fieldwork in the Moscow Oblast and Belgorod Oblast, the southern Ural Mountains, Siberia, the Far East and other regions of the USSR. For the construction of the Moskva-Volga Canal, she topographically surveyed the Moskva River drainage basin in 1932. From 1934 to 1937 she worked in the scientific editorial office of the cartography trust of the Geodesy Main Administration. She was involved in the beginnings of the 1:100,000 scale topographic map of Russia, for which she was honored as a Distinguished Geodesist and Cartographer.

During the German-Soviet War (during World War II), Zarutskaya was involved in the creation of the 1:1,000,000 scale State National Map. After the war, she was the editor-in-chief of the map production department of the Main Administration of Geodesy and Cartography in the creation of the 1:2,500,000 scale Hypsometric Map of the USSR. Beginning in 1951, she created a series of maps for secondary schools.

From 1951 on, Zarutskaya taught at Moscow State University in the Faculty of Geography. In 1953, she was named Chair of Geodesy and Cartography. She was involved in the production of complex regional atlases of the Irkutsk Oblast, Qostanai Oblast and Tyumen Oblast, as well as the Aqmola Region and Altai Region. She worked together with Konstantin Alekseevich Salishchev.

In 1955 she successfully defended her advanced degree in geographical sciences with her thesis titled, Methods of compiling relief on hypsometric maps. In 1966 she successfully defended her doctoral dissertation, Thematic maps of nature, and earned her doctorate in geographical sciences in 1967. She was subsequently appointed professor.

Zarutskaya's work was published widely and she took part in many international conferences and worked on commissions of the International Cartographic Association. After finishing her teaching career, she served as a consultant to the Institute of Geography of the Academy of Sciences of the Soviet Union.

She died on 2 February 1990 in Moscow.

== Honors ==
She won a variety of honors during her lifetime.

- Medal "For the defense of Moscow"
- Medal "For heroic work in the Great Patriotic War 1941–1945"
- Stalin Prize II class (100,000 rubles) in the field of geological-geographical sciences (1951) with the collective for the scientific work on the creation of the hypsometric map of the USSR at a scale of 1:2,250,000 (1950)
- Order of the Red Banner of Labor (twice)
- Decoration of Honor of the Soviet Union
