= Irina Novikova (physicist) =

Russian-American physicist

Irina Borisovna Novikova
- Born: 1975 (age 50–51); Moscow, Russia
- Education: Moscow Engineering Physics Institute; Texas A&M University
- Occupation: Physicist
- Known for: Quantum optics research

Irina Borisovna Novikova (born 1975) is a Russian-American physicist specializing in quantum optics. She is a professor of physics at the College of William & Mary.

== Early life and education ==
Novikova was born in 1975 in Moscow, the daughter of a physicist, and earned a diploma in engineering physics and solid state physics, summa cum laude, from the Moscow Engineering Physics Institute in 1998. She completed her Ph.D. in physics in 2003 at Texas A&M University, with the dissertation Nonlinear magneto-optic effects in optically dense Rb vapor, supervised by George R. Welch.

== Recognition ==
Novikova was named an Optica (OSA) Fellow, in the class of 2020, "for outstanding research of quantum coherence phenomena in atomic vapors, and ongoing service to OSA and the optics community". She was named a Fellow of the American Physical Society in 2023, "for outstanding research on quantum coherence in atomic vapors, including electromagnetically induced transparency and optical magnetometry, and ongoing educational outreach activities in optics and physics".
