= Irina Ouioutova =

Russian volleyball player (born 1979)

Personal information
- Nationality: Russian
- Born: 3 March 1979 (age 47)
- Height: 177 m (580 ft 9 in)

Volleyball information
- Number: 6 (national team)

Career
Years	Teams
1994	Uralochka Ekaterinburg

National team
1994	Russia

Irina Ouioutova (born 3 March 1979) is a retired Russian female volleyball player. She was part of the Russia women's national volleyball team.

She participated in the 1994 FIVB Volleyball Women's World Championship. On club level she played with Uralochka Ekaterinburg.

== Clubs ==
- Uralochka Ekaterinburg (1994)
