= Irina Brzhevskaya =

Russian pop singer and soprano (1929–2019)

- Brzhevskaya in 1993

Background information
- Born: Irina Sergeyevna Brzhevskaya; 27 December 1929; Moscow, RSFSR, Soviet Union
- Origin: Moscow, Soviet Union
- Died: 17 April 2019 (aged 89) Moscow, Russia
- Genres: pop, dance, soviet music
- Occupation: singer
- Instruments: Vocals
- Label: Melodiya

Irina Sergeyevna Brzhevskaya (Russian: Ири́на Серге́евна Брже́вская; 27 December 1929 – 17 April 2019) was a Russian pop singer and soprano.

== Early life ==
Irina was born in Moscow in the family of People's Artist of the RSFSR Sergey Brzhesky. In her childhood she studied ballet and theatrical circles of the Pioneers Palace.

In 1947, entered the vocal department of the musical school, transformed in 1951 into the department of musical comedy of GITIS. He studied with Boris Pokrovsky.

== Career ==
In 1953 Irina was accepted as a soloist in a railway jazz orchestra under the direction of Dmitry Pokrass. Two years later Brzhevskaya performed with the orchestra of Eddie Rosner.

In 1957 she became the organizer of ensemble Vesna (transl. Spring), with which she performed until 1991.

== Recognition ==
- Winner of the festival of pop songs in Dresden (1964)
- Honored Artist of the RSFSR (1978)
- Order of Honour (2000)

== Personal life ==
Her husband Vladimir Zabrodin (born 1930) was a trumpeter.

Brzhevskaya died in Moscow on 17 April 2019, at the age of 89.
