= Irina Posnova =

Russian publisher

Irina Mikhaylovna Posnova (Russian: Ирина Михайловна Поснова; 9 August 1914 in Kiev – 18 December 1997 in Brussels) was publisher, founder of the Catholic publishing house "Life with God" and the ecumenical journal of the same name, was a prominent member of the Russian Greek Catholic Church in exile.

== Biography ==
Born in 1914 in Kiev, in the family of Mikhail Emmanuilovich Posnov, an Orthodox church historian and professor of Kiev Theological Academy.

Irina Posnova moved to Bulgaria and studied at the Russian school in Sofia. Then she moved to Belgium, graduated from the Catholic University of Louvain, defended her doctoral thesis on classical philology. During this period, she was engaged in historical and theological issues. As a result of theological studies she converted to the Catholic Church. After graduation, she taught the Greek language in some schools.

During World War II, Irina Posnova dedicated herself to help the Soviet prisoners of war and displaced persons who worked in the mines in Limburg, and after the war helped refugees from the Soviet Union in Belgium.

Posnova founded publishing house "Life with God", which published Christian books in Russian language. The main goal of the publishing house was publishing of both Orthodox and Catholic literature for the needs of the Russian diaspora, as well as for illegal distribution inside the USSR. Posnova accordingly took an active role in smuggling religious literature into the USSR via diplomatic baggage and its secret dissemination. The activities of the publishing house was held in a spirit of Christian ecumenism.

In 1945 she began publishing a magazine with the same name "Life with God.", with the Orthodox priest Valent Romensky. Since 1951, she edited the magazine "Russian Catholic Herald", later renamed the "Russia and the Universal Church," and in 1971 bore the name of the "Logos."

In 1954 Russian Greek Catholic Church parish was organized in Brussels. In 1958 World Fair took place in Brussels, where the Soviet pavilion was close to the Vatican pavillon. At the suggestion of Irina Posnova in the pavilion was set up a special department, where Soviet tourists were given the Gospels and Orthodox prayer books. Since 1967 Posnova led religious programs in Russian on Radio Monte Carlo. Since 1969, the publishing house, "Life with God" actively published work of Orthodox priest Fr.Alexander Men.

In December 1997, after a long illness, Irina Posnova died in Belgium.
