= Iryna Yevsa =

Ukrainian poet and translator

Iryna Oleksandrivna Yevsa (Russian: Ирина Александровна Евса, Ukrainian: Ірина Олександрівна Євса) (born October 15, 1956) is a Russian-language Ukrainian poet and translator. She lives in Kharkiv, Ukraine.

== Biography ==
Yevsa was born into a military family in Kharkiv, Ukraine SSR. She studied in the philological faculty at the National University of Kharkiv and graduated from Maxim Gorky Literature Institute in Moscow in 1981. Following her graduation, she worked at the Book Chamber of Ukraine from 1981-1986 and began working for the company Apis in 1988. She has recently worked for the National University of Kharkiv.

First published as a poet in 1975, Yevsa also translates literature from Armenian, Georgian, Polish, and Ukrainian into Russian. Her own work has been translated into Ukrainian, Azerbaijani, Armenian, Georgian, Lithuanian, and Serbian.

== Works ==
=== Poetry collections ===
- 1976, Отзвук (Echo)
- 1978, Дыхание (Breath)
- 1985, Август (August)
- 1986, Сад (Garden)
- 1986, День седьмой (Day Seven)
- 1995, Изгнание из рая (Exile from Paradise)
- 1999, Наверное, снилось… (Probably Dreamed...)
- 2000, Лодка на фаянсе (Boat on Faience)
- 2015, Юго-Восток (South-East)

=== Translations and arrangements ===
With the subtitle, "Modern Poetic Version of Iryna Yevsa"

- Faust, Johann Wolfgang von Goethe / translated by Nikolai Aleksandrovich Kholodkovskii
- Divine Comedy, Dante Alighieri. / translated by Dmytry Dmytryevich Minaev
- Paradise Lost and Paradise Regained, John Milton / translated by A. N. Shulgovskaya
- Rubaiyat, Omar Khayyam
- Short stories and poems, Edgar Allan Poe
- Works of Oscar Wilde
- Venus and Adonis, William Shakespeare
- Othello, William Shakespeare / interlinear notes by Pyotr Isaevich Weinberg
- The Rape of Lucrece, William Shakespeare
- Romeo and Juliet, William Shakespeare / interlinear notes by Apollon Aleksandrovich Grigoryev
- Hamlet, William Shakespeare / translated by Konstantin Konstantinovich
- King Lear, William Shakespeaere / translated by M. A. Kuzmina
- The Phoenix and the Turtle, William Shakespeare
- Orphic Hymns
- Song of Songs
- Psalms of David

In collaboration with A. K. Shaposhnikov

- Gathas, Zarathustra
- Selections from the work of Pythagoras
- The fragments of Sappho
- Selected fragments from the Seven Sages
- Book of the Dead
- Prophecies of Pythia and Sibyl

== Awards ==
- 2000, named as a laureate for the International Foundation for the Memory of Boris Chichibabin
- 2013, Paragraph anti-award in the category for "worst translation" criticizing her work translating out-of-copyright literary classics into Russian
- 2016, Russian Prize at the XIV Literary Festival Named after Maximilian Voloshin for her work "Юго-Восток" ("South-East")
