= Irina Mansurova =

Tajikistani biochemist

Irina Jafarovna Mansurova
- Born: 15 November 1925; Bukhara, Soviet Union
- Died: 6 April 1991 (aged 65); Dushanbe, Soviet Union
- Education: Samarkand Medical Institute
- Scientific career
- Fields: Biochemistry
- Workplaces: Tajikistan Academy of Sciences

Irina Jafarovna Mansurova (Tajik: Ирина Джафаровна Мансурова) (15 November 1925 – 6 April 1991) was a Tajikistani biochemist.

Born in Bukhara, Mansurova was a graduate of the Samarkand Medical Institute, from which she received her degree in 1948. From 1951 to 1959 she interned in the Department of Contagious Diseases at the Tajikistan State Medical Institute. In the latter year she became a Senior Scientific Worker, and until 1976 was director of the Biochemistry Division of Medical Research of the Tajik SSR. In 1967 she became a doctor of medicine, become a professor two years later. In 1976, she took over directorship of the biochemical laboratories of the Nature Preservation Division of the Tajikistan Academy of Sciences. In 1960 she was among those who participated in the foundation of the Department of Biochemistry at the Institute of Gastroenterology of the Academy of Sciences. She was the first Soviet scientist to discover principles governing the resolution of microchemical points on the liver; she also worked with the varied ferment constellations, and studied the effects of herbal medicine on organisms. She supervised the publication of the three-volume Experimental Liver Pathology, and herself published such works as The Biochemistry of the Liver During Hepatitis and Psoriasis of the Liver (Dushanbe, 1964) and Selected Lectures About Biochemistry (Dushanbe, 1971); ultimately she published 240 papers during her career, including three monographs. Named a Distinguished Contributor to Health Services of the Soviet Union in 1967, she received a number of medals during her career. Mansurova was married to the therapist Hamid Mansurov; their daughter Farida became a noted biochemist in her own right, and later took over directorship of the Department of Biochemistry at the Institute of Gastroenterology.
