= Irina Bolychevsky =

British activist and data specialist

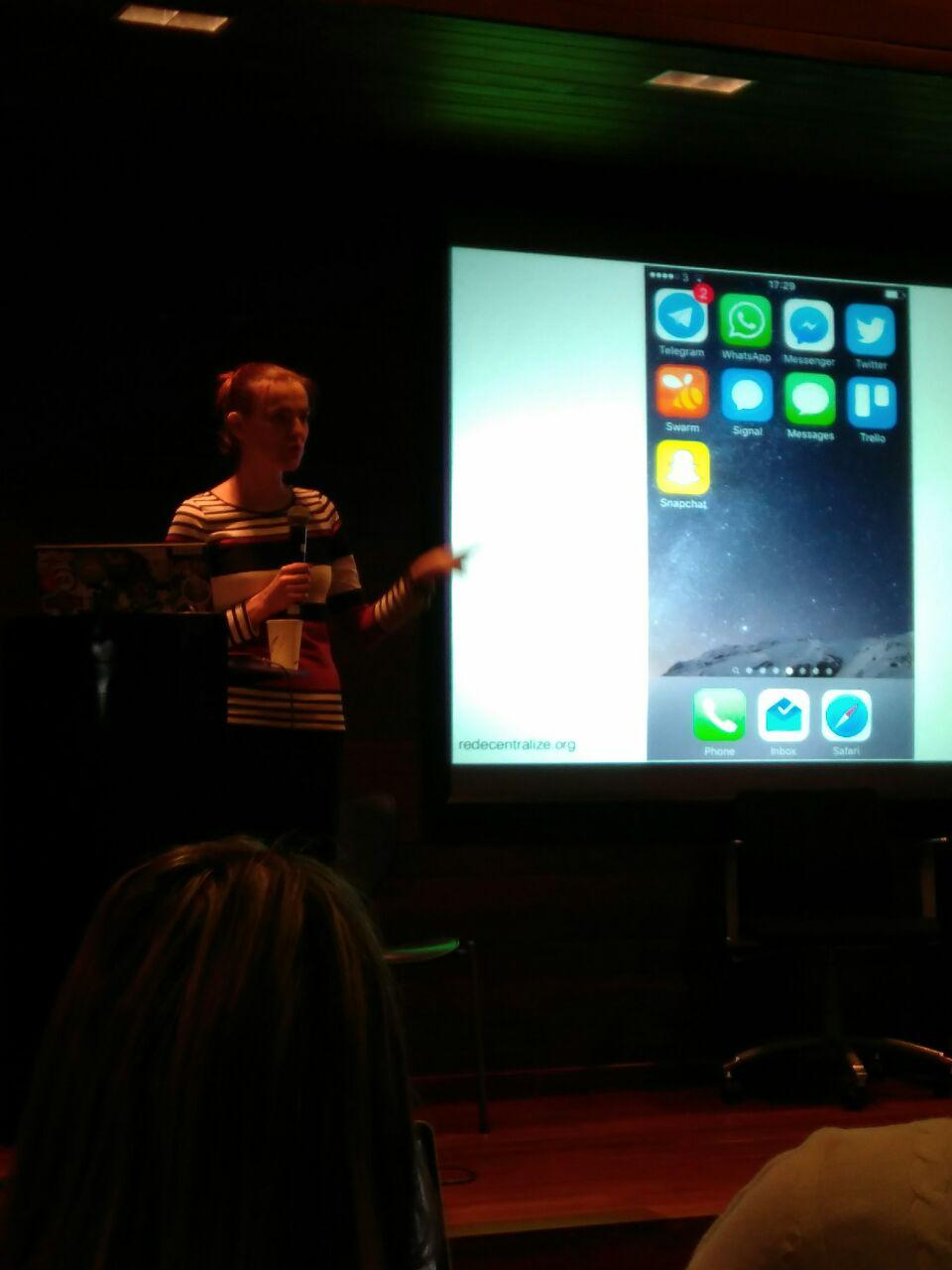
- Born: March 1986 (age 40)
- Citizenship: UK
- Education: University of Oxford
- Organization(s): Open Knowledge Foundation, UK's Government Digital Service, CKAN, W3C
- Known for: Transforming CKAN, co-founding Redecentralize.org
- Board member of: Open Knowledge Foundation
- Awards: Open Data Individual Champion Award
- Website: http://shevski.com

Irina Bolychevsky (born 1986) is a British activist and data specialist, focused on Open Data, decentralized technologies, and technical standards. She is currently director of standards and interoperability at the NHSX of the United Kingdom Government. She has been part of large organizations in those fields, including the Open Knowledge Foundation, the World Wide Web Consortium, and the Open Data Institute, and worked for the UK, Dubai and UAE government administrations. She co-founded Redecentralize.org, an advocacy group promoting decentralized technologies.

== Work ==
She was the product owner of the open-source open data portal CKAN from 2011 to 2014, the period in which it was redesigned in a 2.0 version and where she piloted the transition from a mostly national use in 2011, to international adoption. In this period, she managed its adoption by and relaunch of data.gov. Her work with CKAN allowed her to win the Open Data Individual Champion Award by the Open Data Institute.

Bolychevsky was W3C staff from July 2015 till December 2016. During this period, she was part of the W3C Social Web working group. She actively participated in EU-funded research projects in which the W3C was part of, working on open standards for decentralized technologies developed within the D-Cent project, and on the challenges around open standards within the Big Data Europe project.

Since then, according to her profile by the British Computer Society, she "developed the personal data infrastructure programme within the UK's Government Digital Service", "developed Smart Dubai's and UAE federal policy, regulatory, commercial and technical frameworks for data exchange" and "ran one of the first UK data trust pilots and researched digital identity for the Open Data Institute".

== Activism ==
The group Redecentralize.org, which she co-founded, claims to be "a movement of people pioneering technologies and governance models to redecentralize the web". According to The New Yorker, it is an "advocacy group that provides support for projects that aim to make the Web less centralized". It has also been defined as a "research policy institute".

The group maintains a directory of decentralized web projects which seems to be recognized as the reference list in the field by bloggers and several sites in the field. The group has organized two conferences on the topic, with Bolychevsky as main organizer: in 2015 hosted by ThoughtWorks, and in 2019. These two events hosted speakers such as Open Rights Group's Kevin Marks, Mozilla's Tantek Çelik, Ethereum's Gavin Wood, OAuth's Blaine Cook, Francis Irving, and representatives from Matrix.org, IPFS, Solid and Secure Scuttlebutt. The group has also hosted smaller meetups, one featuring BBC's Bill Thompson, and virtual public meetings, one within the frame of W3C.

She was fellow of the London college for political technologists Newspeak House and co-founder of the Coffee House Club. She is currently co-organizor of the Citizen Beta civic tech meetups, and director/trustee of not-for-profit Eco Soul hostel.

== International recognition ==
In 2014, she was awarded with the Open Data Individual Champion Award for her work with CKAN, as part of the first Open Data awards by the Open Data Institute. Since 2018, she sits on the Board of Directors of the Open Knowledge Foundation, where she was previously Commercial Director.

She has been featured by the New Yorker and twice in the BBC. She was highlighted by the British Computer Society in their "Women in Open Source" series. She has been keynote speaker in several conferences including: Rest Fest, the II Brazilian National Conference on Open Data, MozFest and EmpoderaLive. She has been guest author in the sites of the P2P Foundation, the Sunlight Foundation, the Open Data Institute, the UK online newspaper New Socialist, UK's open data portal data.gov.uk, and US's open data portal data.gov.

== See also ==
- CKAN
- Open Data Institute
