= Irina Hudova =

Finnish ballet dancer

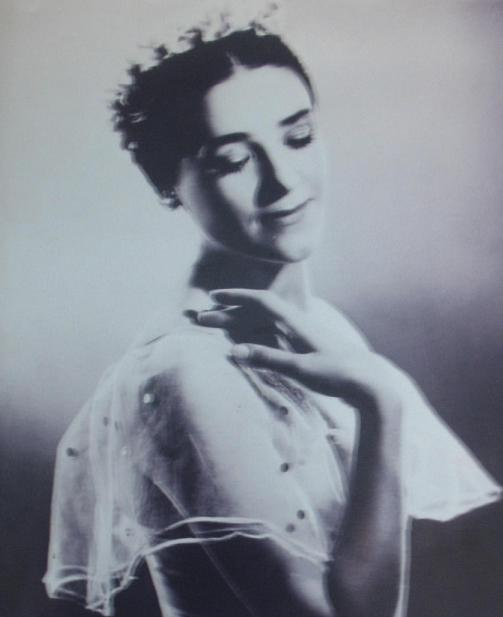
- Irina Hudova, pictured in the 1940s
- Born: 17 June 1926; Viipuri, Finland
- Died: 20 July 2015 (aged 89); Helsinki, Finland

Irina Hudova (17 June 1926 — 20 July 2015) was a Finnish ballerina and dance pedagogue, notable for having served as the director of the Finnish National Ballet as well as the first professor of dance in Finland.

== Education ==
Hudova, who was of Russian descent, received her initial ballet training at the Viipuri City Theatre, and in Helsinki.

She later studied ballet pedagogy at the Kirov (now Mariinsky) and Bolshoi Ballet companies in the Soviet Union, as well as choreography at GITIS.

== Career ==
=== Dancer ===
Hudova was attached to the Ballet of Finland (later to become the Finnish National Ballet) corps de ballet in 1947, and promoted to principal dancer in 1949.

Her professional debut performance was in March 1949, in Swan Lake.

She stayed with the company until 1955, when she began touring mostly as an independent soloist.

=== Pedagogue ===
In the 1960s, Hudova set up her own private ballet schools in Lahti and Porvoo.

She also taught throughout the 1960s and early 70s internationally, in Stockholm, London (at Royal Academy of Dance and Royal Ballet), Washington DC, Monte Carlo, Milan (La Scala) and in Turkey (Istanbul and Ankara) and Japan. She later returned to La Scala, and continued teaching there into the 1990s.

=== Leader ===
In 1972, Hudova was appointed director of the ballet section of the Finnish National Opera and, in the same year, made the first professor of dance in Finland. She, however, left both positions soon after, for 'political' reasons, and returned to teaching.
