= Irina Gulyayeva =

Russian biathlete

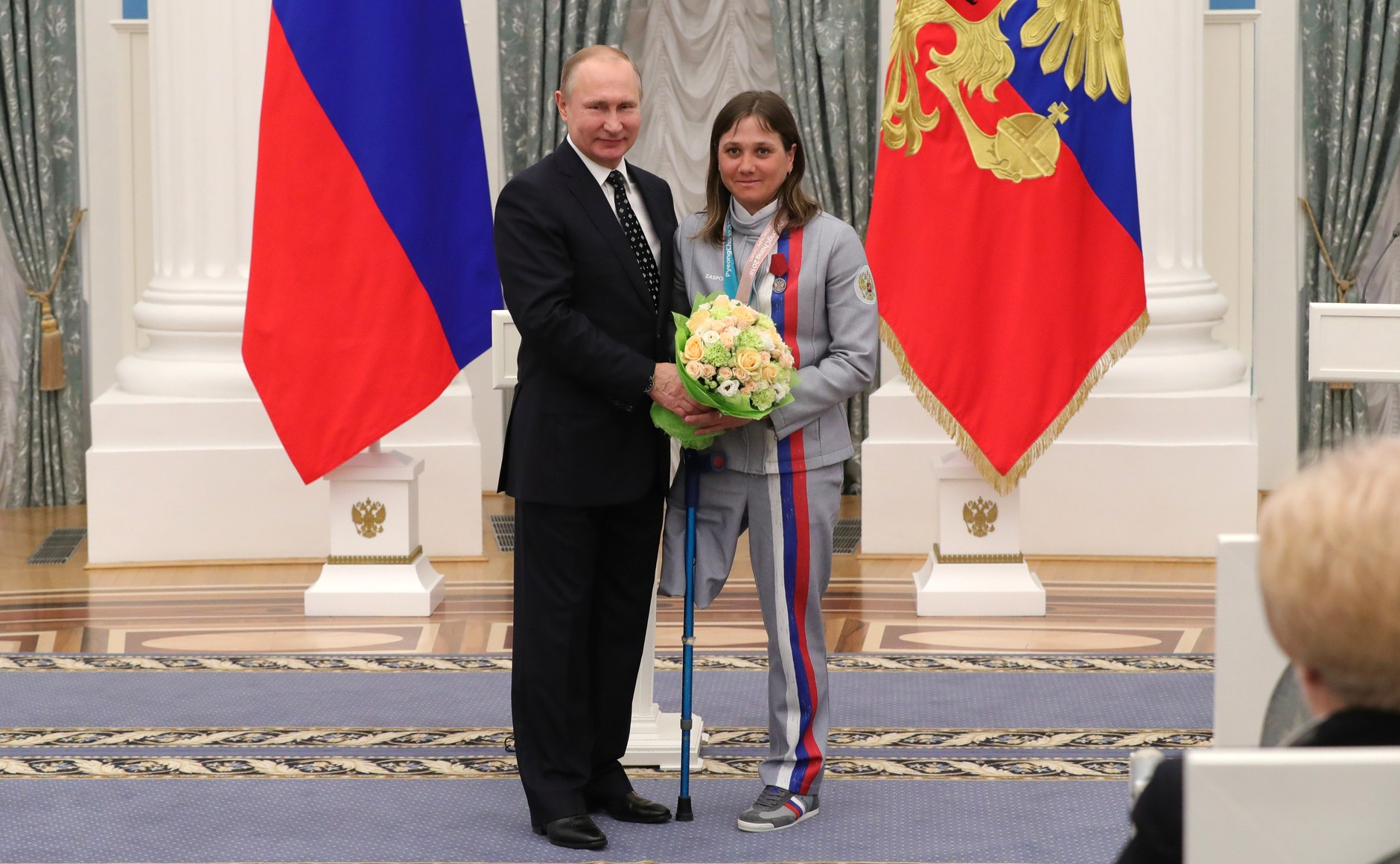
- Vladimir Putin, the Russian President (on the left) congratulates and poses with Irina Gulyayeva (on the right) after the 2018 Winter Paralympics

Personal information
- Nationality: Russian
- Born: 17 May 1984 (age 42)

Sport
- Country: Russia
- Sport: Paralympic Nordic skiing (Paralympic biathlon)
- Disability class: LW5/7
Medal record
Women's para biathlon
Representing the Neutral Paralympic Athletes
Winter Paralympics
Bronze medal – third place	2018 Pyeongchang	10km sitting

Irina Guliaeva (born 17 May 1984) is a Russian biathlete. She represented the Neutral Paralympic Athletes at the 2018 Winter Paralympics.

Ekaterina won a bronze medal in the women's 10km sitting event at the 2018 Winter Paralympics.
