= Iryna Dats =

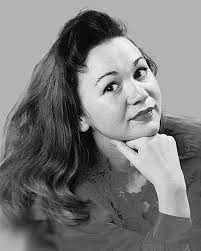
- Occupations: Theatre director, lyric-dramatic soprano
- Known for: Soloist at the National Opera of Ukraine

Iryna Vilyamivna Dats (Ukrainian: Ірина Вільямівна Даць; born April 14, 1963, Zhytomyr, Ukraine) is a Ukrainian opera singer (lyric-dramatic soprano), theater director, educator, and professor. She was awarded the title of People's Artist of Ukraine (2007) and was a soloist at the National Opera of Ukraine.

== Biography ==
Iryna Dats was born in Zhytomyr. In 1987, she graduated from the Kyiv State Conservatory (now the National Music Academy of Ukraine named after P. I. Tchaikovsky). In the same year, she joined the troupe of the National Opera of Ukraine, where she performed leading roles for a lyric-dramatic soprano.

Her repertoire includes a wide range of opera roles, among them: Natalka Poltavka ("Natalka Poltavka" by M. Lysenko), Oksana ("Zaporozhets Beyond the Danube" by S. Hulak-Artemovsky), Anna Yaroslavna ("Anna Yaroslavna - Queen of France" by A. Rudnytsky), Odarka ("Kupalo" by A. Vakhnyanin), Oksana ("Boyarynya" by V. Kyreyko), Maryltzia ("Taras Bulba" by M. Lysenko), Parasia ("Sorochinsky Fair" by M. Mussorgsky), Tatyana ("Eugene Onegin" by P. Tchaikovsky), Yaroslavna ("Prince Igor" by A. Borodin), Donna Anna ("Don Giovanni" by W. A. Mozart), Nedda ("Pagliacci" by R. Leoncavallo), Mimi ("La Bohème" by G. Puccini), Leonora ("Il Trovatore" by G. Verdi), Santuzza ("Cavalleria Rusticana" by P. Mascagni), and Elsa ("Lohengrin" by R. Wagner).

She has performed on stages in more than 30 countries, including the United States, the United Kingdom, France, Italy, Switzerland, Canada, and Kuwait.

== Teaching and directing career ==
Since 2001, she has taught at the Kyiv National University of Culture and Arts, later working at the State Academy of Statistics, Accounting, and Auditing. In 2011, she received the title of Associate Professor, and in 2017, she became a Professor at the National Music Academy of Ukraine. In 2004, she graduated again from the National Music Academy of Ukraine with a degree in musical theater directing. Since 2011, she has been teaching musical theater directing and acting. Her directing work includes operas, concert programs, and literary-musical compositions performed at the National Opera of Ukraine, the National Philharmonic of Ukraine, and the Opera Studio of the National Music Academy of Ukraine. Some of her notable productions include "Rigoletto" by G. Verdi (2016) and "Nocturne" by M. Lysenko (2018). In 2019, she completed a master's degree in "International Management" at the National Academy of Statistics, Accounting, and Auditing.

== Legal dispute with the National Opera of Ukraine ==
After 2014, she faced difficulties at the National Opera of Ukraine due to forced downtime. In 2017, she was dismissed in accordance with Law No. 955-VIII while on medical leave, which led to legal proceedings.
