= Irina Reyn =

American novelist

- Born: 1974 (age 51–52); Moscow, Russia
- Occupations: Associate professor of English, University of Pittsburgh
- Writing career
- Notable work: What Happened to Anna K (2008)

Irina Reyn is a Russian-born American novelist and associate professor of English at the University of Pittsburgh. Her novel, What Happened to Anna K., was selected as the tenth best fiction book of 2008 by Jennifer Reese of Entertainment Weekly, and won the 2009 Goldberg Prize for Jewish Fiction by emerging writers.

== Formative years ==
Born in Moscow, Russia in 1974, Reyn emigrated with her family when she was seven years old. After arriving in the United States, they made their home in Rego Park, Queens, New York City, New York, where she was a classmate of Gary Shteyngart. She was later awarded a Master of Fine Arts degree by Bennington College in Vermont, followed by a Master of Arts in Slavic Languages by the University of Pittsburgh in Pennsylvania in 2001.

== Career ==
The author of short stories early in her creative career, Reyn's first essay was published in 1999. Hired as a faculty member by the University of Pittsburgh in 2006, she was subsequently appointed by that university as an assistant professor of English and then promoted to associate professor. In 2007, she edited Living on the Edge of the World: New Jersey Writers Take on the Garden State. Her first novel, What Happened to Anna K, which was published in 2008 by Touchstone/Simon & Schuster, was awarded the Goldberg Prize for Jewish Fiction by the Foundation for Jewish Culture in 2009. Her second novel, The Imperial Wife, was released by Thomas Dunne Books/St. Martin's Press/Macmillan Publishers in 2016. Mother Country, her third novel, was issued in 2019 by Thomas Dunne Books.

She has also written articles for The New York Times and the Los Angeles Times.

== Works ==
- What Happened to Anna K. (New York: Touchstone/Simon & Schuster, 2008)
- Living on the Edge of the World: New Jersey Writers Take on the Garden State (editor) (New York: Touchstone/Simon & Schuster, 2007)
- The Imperial Wife: A Novel, (New York: St. Martin's Press, 2016)
- Mother Country (New York: St. Martin's Press, 2019)
