= Oxana Kharissova =

Ukrainian–Mexican nanoscientist

Oxana Vasilievna Kharissova (born 1969) is a Ukrainian–Mexican nanoscientist whose research involves the synthesis and solubility of nanoparticles. She is a professor and researcher in the faculty of physical and mathematical sciences at the Autonomous University of Nuevo León.

== Education and career ==
Kharissova was born in 1969 in Ukraine, then part of the Soviet Union. She earned a bachelor's degree in geochemistry in 1993 and a master's degree in crystallography in 1994, both from Moscow State University, before emigrating to Mexico in 1995 and later becoming a Mexican citizen in 2004. She has a 2001 Ph.D. in materials science from the Autonomous University of Nuevo León, where she is a professor and researcher.

== Books ==
Kharissova is a co-author or co-editor of books including:

- Handbook of Less-Common Nanostructures (with Boris I. Kharisov and Ubaldo Ortiz-Mendez, CRC Press, 2012)
- Solubilization and Dispersion of Carbon Nanotubes (with Boris I. Kharisov, Springer, 2017)
- Carbon Allotropes: Metal-Complex Chemistry, Properties and Applications (with Boris I. Kharisov, Springer, 2019)

== Recognition ==
Kharissova is a member of the Mexican Academy of Sciences, elected in 2010. In 2017 the Autonomous University of Nuevo León gave her their "Flama, Vida y Mujer" recognition, in the area of teaching and research.
