= Saint Irene (Great Martyr) =

Pre-congregation saint

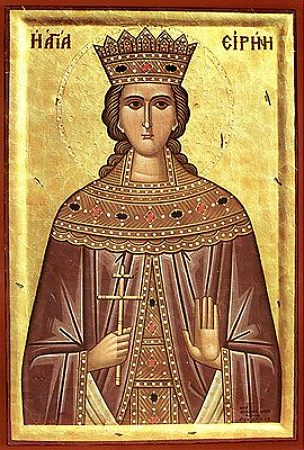

Great Martyr
- Born: Penelope; Mygdonia, Macedonia, Roman Empire
- Died: Constantina, Osrhoene, Sassanid Empire
- Honored in: Orthodox Church, Catholic Church
- Canonized: Pre-Congregation
- Feast: May 5
- Patronage: Santorini, Lecce

Saint Irene (Erina) in Catholicism known as Irene of Lecce and in Orthodox Christianity as Irene of Macedonia (Αγία Ειρήνη η Μεγαλομάρτυς), was a pre-congregation saint, Great Martyr, said to have lived sometime during the 1st or 2nd century.

== Legend ==
Little is known of Irene's early life, and her personage is surrounded by legend. Confusion is driven further by the existence of several similarly named saints around the same time, including Irene of Rome and Irene of Thessalonica.

Sources say she was born Penelope, to a man named Licinius, ruler of Mygdonia (in later legends - in Lecce, Italy) . Some claim her father was the Roman Emperor Licinius, but his biographers mention only a son. Her pagan father, fearful of her beauty, locked her away in a tower at the age of six. She found God in her imprisonment, and He taught her the Christian doctrine. Baptized by Saint Timothy, she renounced her birth name, took the name Irene, and destroyed the idols that her father gave her to worship.

Irene's father, angered by her actions, ordered for her to be tied to a horse and dragged to death. She survived the dragging and the horse turned on her father and bit him. His injury festered, leading to his death, but Irene prayed over his body and brought him back to life. The end of her legend appears to differ, depending on who is telling the story.

In one rendition, Irene converts her father to Christianity and the two become evangelists. They convert thousands of pagans, until a Governor named "Ampelio" captures and imprisons the pair. Ampelio attempted to torture Irene until she renounced her faith; when she refused, he had her beheaded.

Another version has her sentenced to death by Shapur I in the Sasanian Empire, around the time of the Constantinian dynasty.

== Veneration ==
Though Irene's life story remains a mystery, it's known that at least two churches bore her name in 5th-century Constantinople. The Chiesa di Sant'Irene, or Church of Saint Irene, in Lecce was built between 1591 and 1639 and dedicated to the patron saint of the city by the Theatines. The statue of Irene on the façade was sculpted around the late 17th or early 18th century.

She is celebrated mostly in the Eastern Orthodox Church (Greece and Russia) and the Coptic Orthodox Church.

Irene was the patron saint of Lecce until 1656, being replaced by Saint Orontius after his feast day was combined with that of Fortunatus and Justus. She is patron of the Greek island of Santorini.

== Links ==
- Life (in Russian)
