= Irina Zhdanovich =

Belarusian actress and theatre director

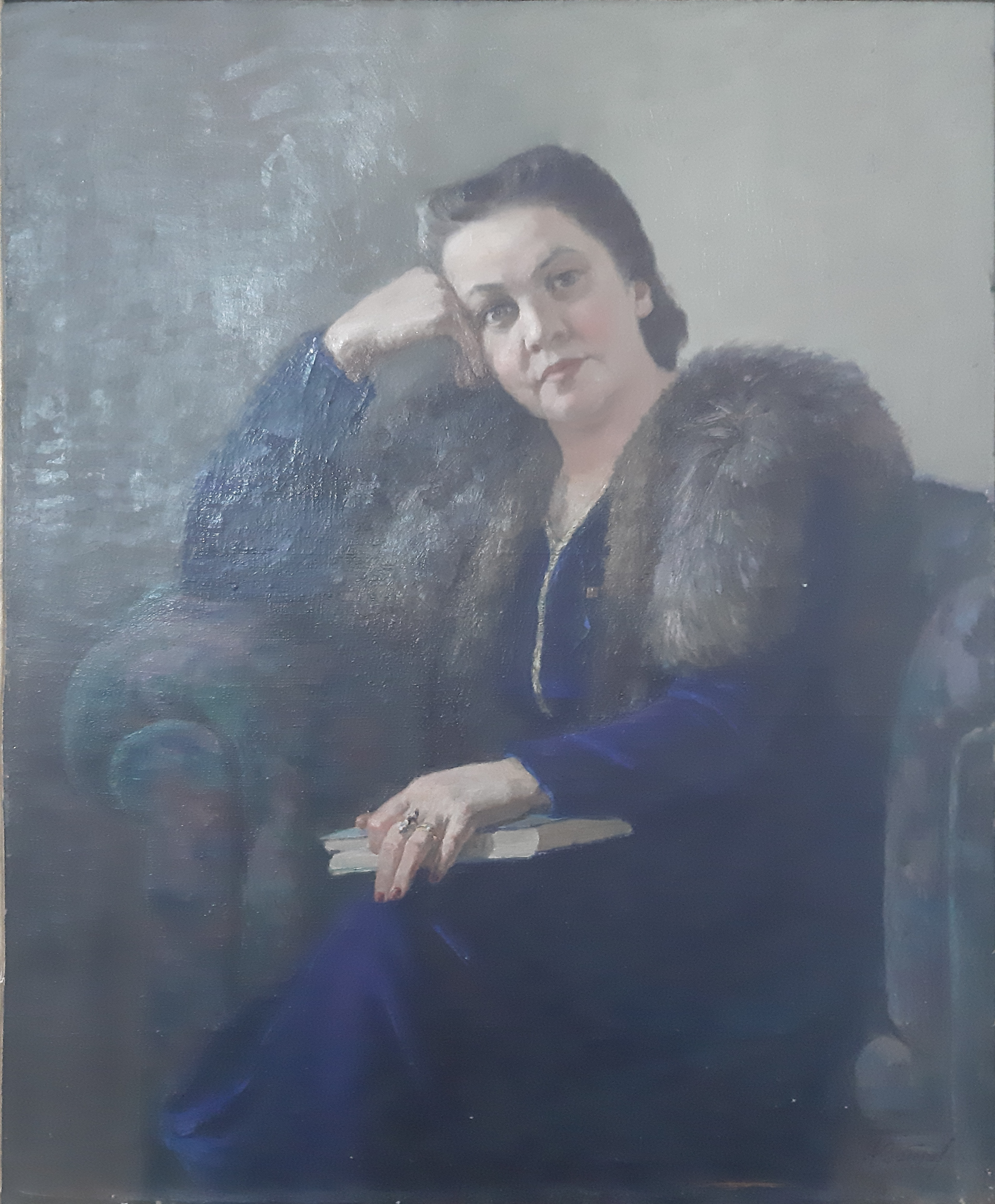
- Born: Irina Florianovna Zhdanovich; 10 October 1906; Minsk, Russian Empire
- Died: 3 December 1994 (aged 88); Minsk, Belarus
- Occupation: Actress

Irina Florianovna Zhdanovich (Belarusian: Ірына Фларыянаўна Ждановіч, 10 October 1906 — 3 December 1994) was a Soviet and Belarusian actress. She received numerous distinctions including the People's Artist of the Byelorussian Soviet Socialist Republic in 1940 and Stalin Prize in 1948.

== Biography ==
She was born in Minsk, Russian Empire (now Belarus). She was married to Boris Platonov.

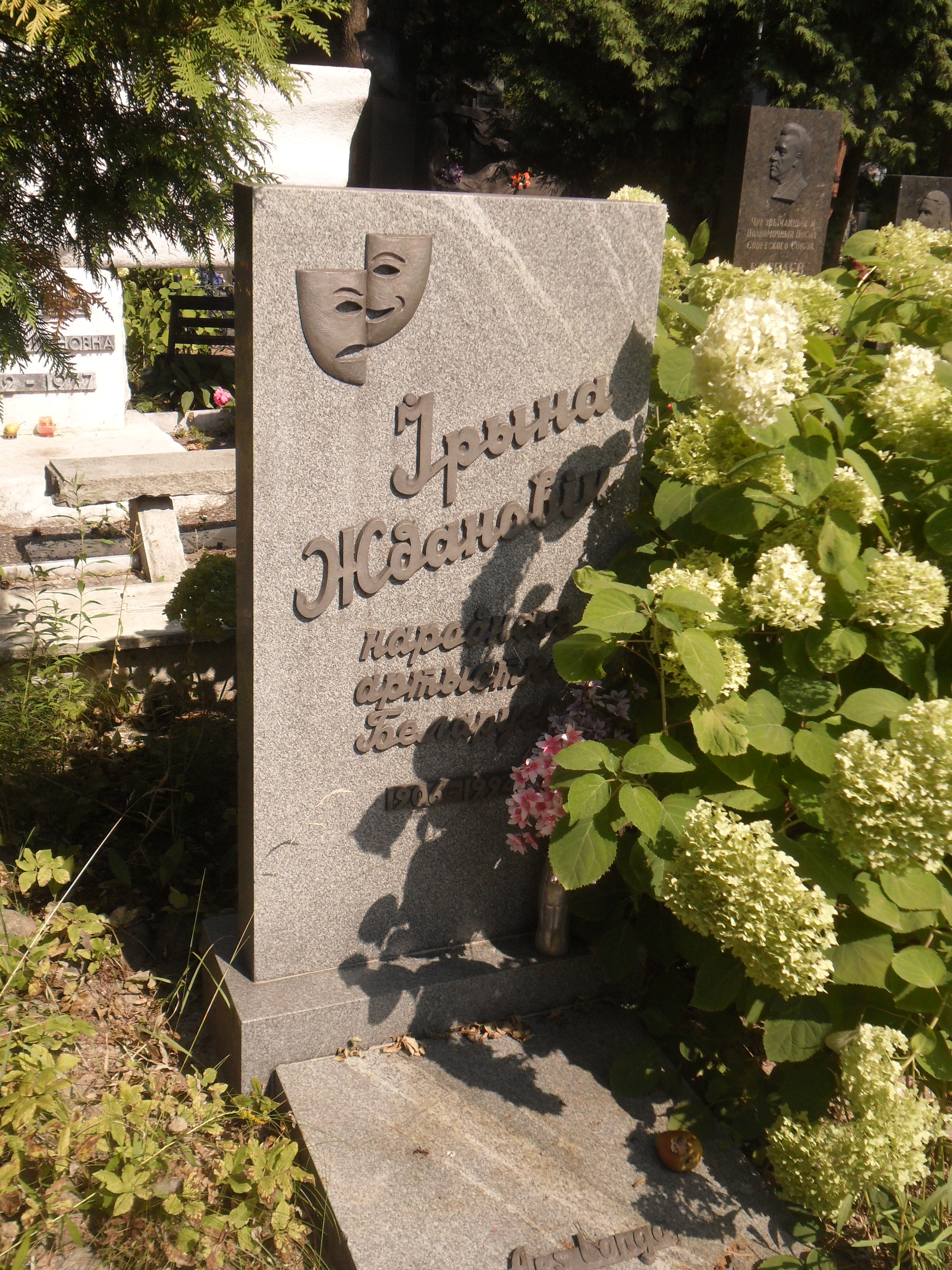
Zhadanovich's gravestone located in the Eastern Cemetery in Minsk.

Zhdanovich was a member of the Communist Party of the Soviet Union from 1947 to 1991. She was also a deputy of the Supreme Soviet of the BSSR in its second and fourth convocations.

She died on 3 December 1999 and was buried in the Eastern Cemetery in Minsk.

== Career ==
In 1920, Zhdanovich opened the Belarusian State Theater, now named Janka Kupala National Theatre, the first state theater in Belarus. On the day of the theater's opening, she played the lead role in Lynx, based on Eliza Orzeszkowa's W zimowy wieczór.

Zhdanovich has acted in numerous plays at the theater including Marylka in Kuźma Čorny's Fatherland, Vera in Maxim Gorky's The Last Ones, Nastya in Eduard Samuylenok's The Death of the Wolf, Anya in Arkady Movzon's Constantine Zaslonov, Negina in Alexander Ostrovsky's Talents and Admirers, and Nora in Henrik Ibsen's A Doll's House.

Zhdanovich played the role of priest at the execution in Kastus Kalinovskiy, a biopic film directed by Vladimir Gardin.

== Awards ==
Zhdanovich has won several awards and distinctions for her work. In 1940, she was named the People's Artist of the Byelorussian Soviet Socialist Republic. Zhdanovich has also received two Orders of Lenin and the Order of the Red Banner of Labour.

She was the recipient of the Stalin Prize in 1948 for her role as Anya in Constantine Zaslonov.
