= Irina A. Lubensky =

American anatomical pathologist

- Education: University of Pennsylvania; Temple University
- Scientific career
- Fields: Surgical pathology, cancer research
- Workplaces: National Institutes of Health

Irina A. Lubensky is an American surgical pathologist serving as chief of the pathology investigation and resources branch at the National Cancer Institute.

== Life ==
Lubensky earned a B.A. in biology from the University of Pennsylvania in 1983. She received her M.D. degree from Temple University School of Medicine. She is board certified in anatomic pathology. Lubensky completed her pathology residency (1987 to 1991) and surgical pathology fellowship (1991 to 1992) at the Hospital of the University of Pennsylvania.

Lubensky was a surgical pathologist and chief of the hereditary cancer syndrome unit at National Institutes of Health's laboratory of pathology. She was also a translational researcher at the surgical neurology branch at National Institute of Neurological Disorders and Stroke. She joined the National Cancer Institute (NCI) as the chief of the pathology investigation and resources branch in the division of cancer treatment and diagnosis. In this role, she oversees NCI multi-institutional cooperative agreement grants for biospecimen banking to support cancer research including Cooperative Human Tissue Network (CHTN) and NCI Clinical Trials Network Biospecimen Banks (NCTN Banks), as well as the NCI Specimen Resource Locator.
