= Irina Davydovna Kuznetsova =

Soviet-Latvian communist politician

Irina Davydovna Kuznetsova (born 1923) was a Soviet-Latvian communist politician.

Kuznetsova served as Minister of Food Industry from 1965 to 1984.
