= Irina Gubkina =

Russian luger (born 1972)

Irina Gubkina (born April 19, 1972, in Leningrad) is a Russian luger who competed in the mid to late 1990s. Competing in two Winter Olympics, Obkircher earned her best finish of seventh in the women's singles event at Lillehammer in 1994.
