= Irene (given name) =

Female given name

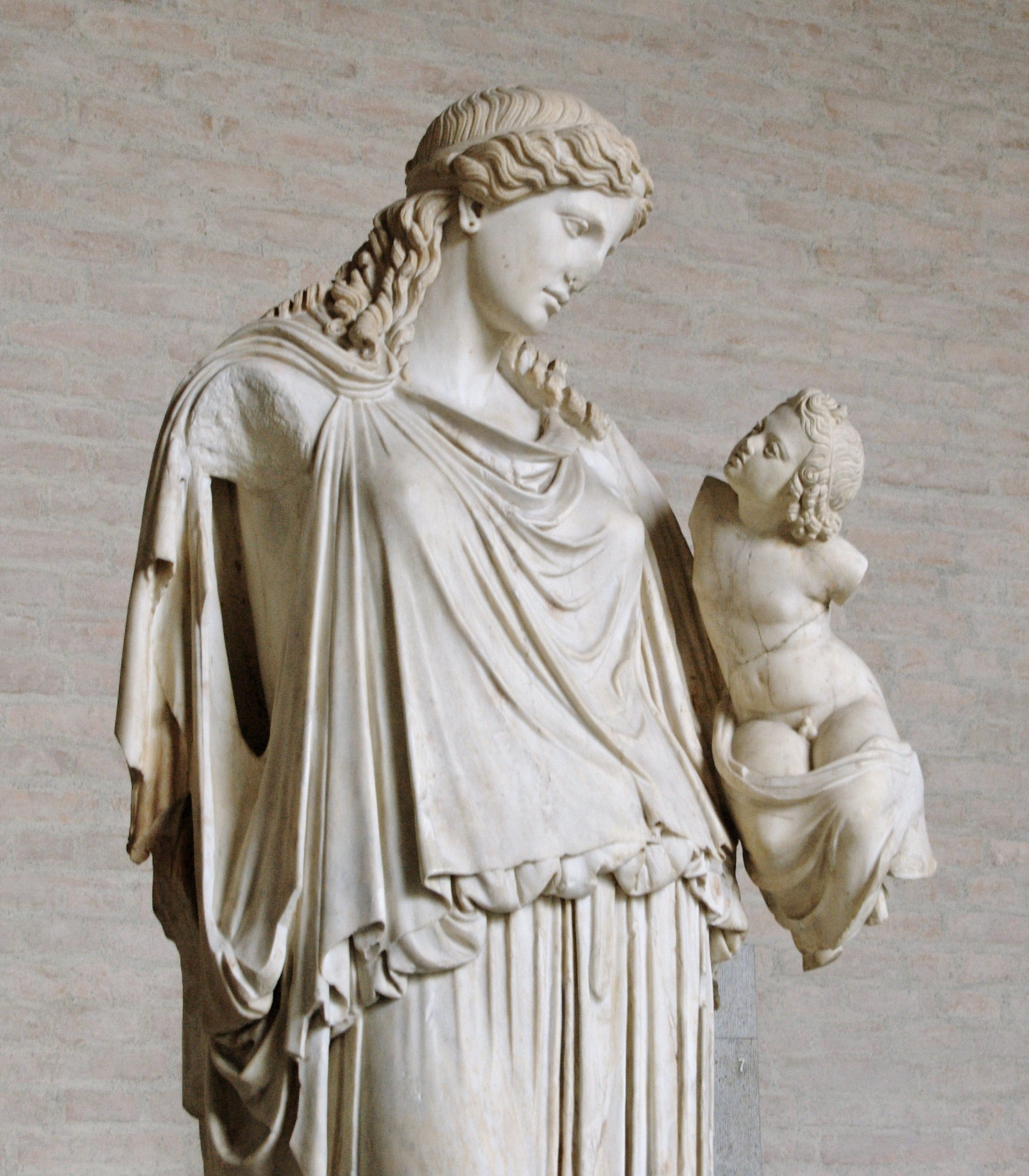
- Eirene, one of the three Horae, was the Greek goddess of peace and the spring season.
- Pronunciation: /aɪˈriːn/ eye-REEN; /aɪˈriːni/ eye-REEN-ee
- Gender: Female

Origin
- Origin: Greek
- Meaning: Peace

Other names
- Related names: Arina, Eirene, Iren, Irena, Irina, Rina

Irene (Ancient Greek: Ειρήνη, romanized: Eirḗnē), sometimes written Irini, is derived from εἰρήνη, the Greek word for "peace". Eirene was the Greek goddess of peace and of the spring season.

Irene was also the name of an 8th-century Byzantine empress (Irene of Athens), as well as the name of several saints (see Saint Irene).

== Variants ==
- Airin (Indonesian)
- Arina (Russian)
- Arisha (Russian)
- Eireen (English, Irish)
- Eirena (English)
- Eirene (English, Greek)
- Eirini (Greek)
- Eraina (English)
- Erayna (English)
- Erea (Galicia)
- Erene (English)
- Ereni (Greek)
- Eriny (Greek, similar to the pronunciation of)
- Ira (Indonesian, Russian, Ukrainian)
- Ireen (English)
- Iren (English) (Indonesian)
- Irén (Hungarian)
- Irena (Albanian, Croatian, Czech, Dutch, English, Indonesian, Latvian, Lithuanian, Macedonian, Polish, Serbian, Slovak, Slovenian)
- Irene (Dutch, German, English, Italian, Latvian, Spanish, Portuguese)
- Irène (French)
- Irenea (Spanish)
- Irenka (Czech, Polish, Slovak)
- Iria (Galician, Portuguese)
- Iriana (English)
- Iriana, Irene (Indonesian)
- Iriena (English)
- Irin (English)
- Irini (Albanian)
- Irina (Bulgarian, Finnish, Romanian, Russian)
- Irine (English)
- Irina (Russian, Romanian)
- Irinka (Russian)
- Irishka (Russian, Ukrainian)
- Irinushka (Russian)
- Irisha (Russian)
- Irja (Finnish)
- Irka (Czech)
- Iryna (English, Ukrainian)
- Irynka (Ukrainian)
- Irynochka (Ukrainian)
- Reeni (English)
- Reeny (English)
- Rena (English, Indonesian, Greek)
- Rene (English)
- Reney (English)
- Reni (English, Indonesian)
- Renie (English)
- Rina (Indonesian, Russian)
- Yarina (Russian)
- Yaryna (Ukrainian)
- Yeran (Armenian)
- Yeranouhi (Armenian)

== People with the given name ==
- Irene, baptismal name of Tzitzak (died 750), wife of Byzantine Emperor Constantine V
- Irene of Athens (c. 752 – 803), wife of Byzantine Emperor Leo IV and empress regnant, 797–802
- Irene of Hungary (1088–1134), empress consort of John II Komnenos of the Byzantine Empire
- Irene Angelina (fl. late 1100s)
- Irene Choumnaina (1291 – c. 1355)
- Irene Palaiologina (fl. 1310), illegitimate daughter of Andronikos II Palaiologos, wife of John II Doukas of Epirus
- Irene Shpata (14th century), Albanian Princess of Arta and Despotess consort of Epirus
- Irene Dushmani (15th century), Albanian Princess of Zadrima and Pult
- Princess Irene of Greece and Denmark (1904–1974), later Duchess of Aosta, Queen of Croatia
- Princess Irene of Greece and Denmark (1942–2026)
- Princess Irene of the Netherlands (born 1939)
- Princess Irene of Hesse and by Rhine (1866–1953)
- Saint Irene (disambiguation), various saints
- Eirene (artist), ancient Greek artist
- Irene (singer) (born 1991), South Korean singer
- Irene Abel (born 1953), East German gymnast
- Irene Abendroth (1872–1932), Austrian operatic soprano
- Irene Abrigo (born 1988), Italian violinist
- Irene Adams (born 1947), Scottish politician
- Irene Aebi (born 1939), Swiss singer, violinist and cellist
- Irene Aguilar (born 1960), American politician
- Irene Agyepong (born 1960), Ghanaian public health physician
- Irene Ajambo (born 1987), Ugandan weightlifter
- Irene Zoe Alameda, Spanish writer, filmmaker and composer
- Irene Osgood Andrews (1879–1963), American writer
- Irene Ang (born 1969), Singaporean actress, comedian, host and entrepreneur
- Irene Angelico, Canadian film director, producer and writer
- Irene Kataq Angutitok (1914–1971), Inuk sculptor
- Irene Arcos (born 1981), Spanish actress
- Irene Aronson, German-American painter
- Irene Astor, Baroness Astor of Hever (1919–2001), English philanthropist
- Irene Avaalaaqiaq Tiktaalaaq (born 1941), Canadian artist
- Irene Awret (1921–2014), German artist and writer
- Irene Azuela (born 1979), Mexican actress and producer
- Irene Bache (1901–1999), British artist
- Irene Baird, English-Canadian novelist
- Irene Baker (botanist) (1918–1989), British-born American botanist
- Irene Baker (1901–1994), American politician
- Irene Baldessari (born 1993), Italian middle-distance runner
- Irene Barberis (born 1953), Australian artist
- Irene Barclay (1894–1989), British surveyor
- Irene Barros (1930–2021), Indian politician
- Irene Bayer-Hecht (1898–1991), American photographer
- Irene Beardsley (born 1935), American mountaineer
- Irene Beasley (1904–1980), American singer
- Irene Blanco Becerra (born 1946), Mexican politician
- Irene Becker, German nurse and serial killer
- Irene Bedard (born 1967), Native American actress
- Irene Beland, American nursing educator and patient-centered care researcher
- Irene Bell Bonong (born 1995), Cameroonian sprinter
- Irene Below, German art historian
- Irene Benneweis (1891–1970), Danish acrobat and circus director
- Irene Bentley (1870–1940), American actress
- Irene Berger (born 1954), American judge
- Irene Bernasconi (1896–1989), Argentine marine biologist
- Irene Bertschek, German economist
- Irene Beyeler (born 1985), Swiss sport shooter
- Irene Beyerlein, American materials scientist
- Irene Bianucci (1903–1988), Italian-American painter
- Irene Craigmile Bolam (1904–1982), American banker and former aviator
- Irene Borrego (born 2001), Mexican weightlifter
- Irene Bosch, Venezuelan biologist and researcher
- Irene Mott Bose, American social worker
- Irene Bridger (21st century), Canadian singer
- Irene Brietzke (1944–2021), Brazilian actress and theatre director
- Irene Brin (1911–1969), Italian journalist and writer
- Irene Britton Smith (1907–1999), American classical composer
- Irene Broe (1923–1992), Irish sculptor
- Irene Brown (1919–2017), British code breaker
- Irene Bennett Brown, American author
- Irene Browne (1891–1965), British actress
- Irene Mary Browne (1881–1977), British artist
- Irene Bucher, Swiss orienteering competitor
- Irene Bürgi, Swiss curler
- Irene Burillo Escorihuela (born 1997), Spanish tennis player
- Irene Burns, American television producer
- Irene Bustamante Adams, American politician
- Irene Butter, German-born American economist and holocaust survivor
- Irene Byers (1906–1992), English novelist, poet and children's writer
- Irene Caba Alba (1905–1957), Spanish actress
- Irene Cabrera Lorenzo, Spanish former volleyball player
- Irene Cadurisch (born 1991), Swiss biathlete
- Irene Calvert (1909–2000), Northern Irish politician and economist
- Irene Camber (1926–2024), Italian fencer
- Irene Campbell, Scottish Labour politician
- Irene Capek (1924–2006), Australian politician
- Irene Cara (1959–2022), American singer, songwriter, and actress
- Irene Castelli (born 1983), Italian gymnast
- Irene Aragón Castillo (born 1963), Mexican politician
- Irene Castle (1893–1969), half of the ballroom dance team of Vernon and Irene Castle
- Irene Cefaro (1935–2023), Italian stage and film actress
- Irene Champlin (1932–1990), American actress
- Irene Chang, Malaysian politician
- Irene Chanter, British singer
- Irene Charalambidou (born 1964), Cypriot journalist and politician
- Irene Charnley (born 1960), South African businesswoman
- Irene Chen, Australian actress
- Irene Cheng (1904–2007), Hong Kong educationalist
- Irene Chepet Cheptai (born 1992), Kenyan distance runner
- Irene Chou (1924–2011), Chinese artist
- Irene Clarin (born 1955), German television and theatre actress
- Irene Clark Durrell (1852–1914), American educator
- Irene Clark, Navajo weaver
- Irene V. Clark (1927–1984), American artist
- Irene Coates (1925–2019), English playwright, poet, painter, feminist and environmentalist
- Irene Collins (1925–2015), British historian and writer
- Irene Colvin Corbett (1881–1912), American nurse and musician who died on the Titanic
- Irene Condachi (1899–1970), Maltese physician
- Irene Cortes (1921–1996), Associate Justice of the Supreme Court of the Philippines
- Irene Cortes (artist), filmmaker and artist
- Irene Costa (born 1972), Portuguese politician and social worker
- Irene Cozad (1888–1970), American pianist, piano teacher and composer
- Irene Crespin (1896–1980), Australian geologist and micro paleontologist
- Irene Cruz, Spanish photographer and video artist
- Irene Cruz-González, Mexican astronomer
- Irene Cuadrado (born 1979), Spanish painter
- Irene Cuesta (born 1983), Spanish archer and archery coach
- Irene Curtoni (born 1985), Italian alpine skier
- Irene Curzon, 2nd Baroness Ravensdale (1896–1966), British hereditary peeress
- Irene Cybulsky, Canadian lawyer and cardiac surgeon
- Irene Dailey (1920–2008), American actress
- Irene Dalby (born 1971), Norwegian swimmer
- Irene Dalis (1925–2014), American opera singer
- Irene Dallas (1883–1971), British suffragette
- Irene Dalton (1901–1934), American actress
- Irene Dare, American figure skater and film star
- Irene Daw (1941–2010), British sports shooter
- Irene Daye (1918–1971), American jazz musician
- Irene Dean-Williams (1903–1946), aviator
- Irene DeBari (born 1947), American television actress
- Irène Debrunner (born 1952), Swiss swimmer
- Irene DeLaby (1922–2012), American baseball player
- Irène Deliège (1933–2024), Belgian cognitive scientist
- Irene Delroy (1900–1985), American stage actress
- Irene Desmet (1928–2020), English pediatric surgeon
- Irene Devin, Wyoming politician
- Irene Diaz, American singer-songwriter
- Irene Dick (born 1949), Curaçaoan politician
- Irene Caroline Diner Koenigsberger (1896–1985), American chemist
- Irene Dingel (born 1956), German historian and Protestant theologian
- Irene Dische (born 1952), American-Austrian writer
- Irene Dixon (1924–2021), Bletchley Park codebreaker
- Irene Dölling (born 1942), German sociologist
- Irene Dorner (born 1954), American businesswoman
- Irene Doukaina (c. 1066–1138), Empress Consort of the Byzantine Empire
- Irene Doutney (c. 1949–2018), Australian politician
- Irène Drésel (born 1984), French electronic music producer
- Irene Drummond, Australian Army nurse
- Irene Dubois, American drag performer
- Irene Dufaux (born 1960), Swiss sport shooter
- Irene Dunne (1898–1990), American actress
- Irene Eastman (1894–1918), American singer
- Irene Eber (1929–2019), Israeli orientalist
- Irene Edgar (born 1957), Scottish lawn bowler
- Irene Eijs (born 1966), Dutch rower
- Irene Eisinger (1903–1994), German-British opera singer and film actress
- Irene Ekelund (born 1997), Swedish sprinter
- Irene Ellenberger (born 1946), German architect
- Irene Emery (1900–1981), American art historian, scholar, curator, textile anthropologist, sculptor, and modern dancer
- Irene Epple (born 1957), German alpine skier
- Irene Escolar (born 1988), Spanish actress
- Irene Esser (born 1991), Venezuelan actress, model and beauty queen
- Irene Evans, musician and educator
- Irene Eyaru, Ugandan netball player
- Irene Fairbairn (1899–1974), Girl Guide Commissioner
- Irene Falcón (1907–1999), Spanish journalist, feminist, pacifist and communist activist
- Irene Fargo (1962–2022), Italian singer and actress
- Irene Fenwick (1887–1936), American actress
- Irene Ferguson, New Zealand painter
- Irene Fernandez (1946–2014), Malaysian human rights activist
- Irene Ferreira (born 1976), Venezuelan model
- Irene Ferreiro (born 2001), Spanish actress, singer and author
- Irene Ferri (born 1972), Italian actress and television presenter
- Irene Fischer (1907–2009), Austrian-American mathematician and geologist
- Irene Fitzner (born 1955), Argentine sprinter
- Irene Fonseca (born 1956), Portuguese-American mathematician
- Irene Foote, several people
- Irene Forbes (1949–2014), Cuban fencer
- Irene Fornaciari (born 1983), Italian singer-songwriter
- Irene Fountas (born 1948), American educational theorist
- Irène Frain (born 1950), French novelist, journalist and historian
- Irene Franchini (born 1981), Italian archer
- Irene Franklin (1885–1941), American actress
- Irene Hanson Frieze, American psychologist and academic
- Irene Frisch (1931–2021), American writer
- Irene Fuhrmann (born 1980), Austrian footballer
- Irene McCoy Gaines (1892–1964), American social worker and civil rights activist
- Irene Galitzine (1916–2006), Russian-Georgian fashion designer
- Irene O. Galloway, American Army soldier
- Irène Galter (1931–2018), Italian actress
- Irene M. Gamba, Argentine-American mathematician
- Irene Gammel (born 1959), Canadian literary historian, biographer and curator
- Irene García (born 1980), Spanish politician
- Irene Gardner (born 1985), American rugby sevens player
- Irene Gargantini, Italian-Canadian computer scientist
- Irene Gattilusio (died 1440), Byzantine Empress consort
- Irene Gauthier (1920–2010), American massage teacher
- Irene Antoinette Geffen, South African lawyer
- Irene Genna (1931–1986), Greek-born Italian film and television actress
- Irene Georgakoudi (born 1971), Greek physicist
- Irini Georgatou (b. 1990), Greek tennis player
- Irene George (born 1983), Solomon Islands tennis player
- Irene Germini (born 1974), Italian rhythmic gymnast
- Irene Ghobrial, American-Egyptian physician and academic
- Irini Giannatou (1917–2000), birth name of Greek actress and singer Rena Dor
- Irene M. Giblin (1888–1974), American pianist and composer
- Irene Gifford, American politician
- Irène Gijbels, mathematical statistician
- Irene Gilbert (1934–2011), German-American actress
- Irene Gilbert (swimmer) (1903–1988), British swimmer
- Irene Gilbert (fashion designer) (c. 1910 – 1985), Irish fashion designer
- Irene Gleeson (1944–2013), Australian aid worker
- Irene Goergens (born 1951), German militant
- Irene Gonçalves (born 1984), Angolan footballer
- Irene González, several people
- Iréne Grahn (1945–2013), Swedish visual artist and inventor
- Irene Grandi (born 1969), Italian singer and songwriter
- Irene Greenwood (1898–1992), Australian feminist, pacifist activist, broadcaster and writer
- Irene Gregory, American aerospace engineer
- Irene Greif, American computer scientist
- Irene Griegst (born 1945), Moroccan-born Danish goldsmith
- Irene Griffin (activist), African-American activist
- Irene Griffin, American politician
- Irene Welch Grissom (1873–1965), American poet
- Irene Grootboom, South African housing rights activist
- Irene Güdel (1930–2023), Swiss cellist
- Irene Guerrero (born 1996), Spanish footballer
- Irene Guest (1900–1970), American swimmer
- Irene Gurney (c. 1870–1951), Canadian pianist and clubwoman
- Irene Haines, American politician and businesswoman from Connecticut
- Irene Hall (1888–1961), Australian hospital matron
- Irene Handl (1901–1987), British character actress
- Irene Hannon, American author
- Irene Harand (1900–1975), Austrian human rights activist
- Irene Haschke (born 1921), German SS guard during World War II
- Irene Hayes (1896–1975), American actress
- Irene Hays (born 1953/1954), British civil servant and businesswoman
- Irene Headin, Canadian handball player
- Irene Hedlund (born 1947), Danish illustrator and children's writer
- Irene Heim (born 1954), American linguist
- Irene Hervey (1909–1998), American film, stage and television actress
- Irene Hess (1910–2009), American statistician
- Irene Hickson (1915–1995), American baseball player
- Irene Higginbotham (1918–1988), American musician
- Irene Hirano (1948–2020), American business executive
- Irene Hirst (1930–2000), British gymnast
- Irene Hoffar Reid (1908–1994), Canadian painter
- Irene Whitfield Holmes (1900–1993), American musicologist and ethnomusicologist
- Irene Hostettler (born 1974), Swiss cyclist
- Irene Howard (1903–1981), British costume designer
- Irene Hughes (1920–2012), American psychic
- Irene Hunt (actress) (1892–1988), American actress
- Irene Hunt (1902–2001), American children's writer
- Irene ʻĪʻī Brown Holloway, Hawaiian philanthropist
- Irene Iacopi, Italian archaeologist
- Irene Ibsen Bille (1901–1985), Norwegian novelist and playwright
- Irene Ighodaro (1916–1995), Sierra Leone Creole physician and social worker
- Irene Ivancan (born 1983), German table tennis player
- Irene Jacob (born 1966), French-born Swiss actress
- Irene Jakab (1919–2011), Hungarian-born psychiatrist
- Irene James, Welsh politician
- Irene Jansen (born 1983), Dutch singer
- Irene Jelagat (born 1988), Kenyan middle-distance runner
- Irene Jerotich Kosgei (born 1974), Kenyan long-distance runner
- Irène Joachim (1913–2001), French soprano and vocal teacher
- Irene Johansen (born 1961), Norwegian politician
- Irène Joliot-Curie (1897–1956), French scientist
- Irene Jones, Canadian politician
- Irene de Jong, Dutch classicist
- Irene Joseph (born 1981), Indonesian sprinter
- Irene Junquera (born 1985), Spanish journalist
- Irene Kampen (1922–1998), American writer
- Irene Kantakouzene (died 1457), wife of Serbian despot
- Irini Karra (born 1986), Greek fashion model
- Eirini Kavarnou (born 1980), Greek swimmer
- Irene Kelley, American country and bluegrass singer
- Irene Keng, American actress
- Irene Kepl (born 1982), Austrian violinist and composer
- Irene Kerwin (1925–2023), American baseball player
- Irene Khan (born 1956), Bangladeshi academic
- Irene Kim (born 1987), Korean-American model and television personality
- Irene Kirpal (1886–1977), Czech politician
- Irene Kitchings (1908–1975), American musician and pianist
- Irene Koh (born 1990), comics artist
- Irene de Kok (born 1963), Dutch judoka
- Irene Kopelman, Argentine-Dutch artist
- Irene Koss (1928–1996), German actress and presenter
- Irene Kotowicz (1919–2002), American baseball player
- Irene Koumarianou (1931–2013), Greek actress
- Irene Kowaliska (1905–1991), Italian painter, ceramicist and fabric designer
- Irene Kral (1932–1978), American jazz musician
- Irene Krugman (1925–1982), American sculptor
- Irene Krugman Rudnick (1929–2019), American politician
- Irene Corbally Kuhn (1898–1995), American journalist and author
- Irene Küng, Swiss photographer
- Irene Kuo (1919–1993), Chinese-American chef and bookwriter
- Irene Kuzemko, intersex activist
- Irene Kwambai (born 1978), Kenyan long-distance runner
- Irene Kwok (born 1933), Hong Kong swimmer
- Irene Lalji (died 2021), Surinamese lawyer and television presenter
- Irène Landau, French parasitologist
- Irene Lardschneider (born 1998), Italian biathlete
- Irene Larsen (1936–2016), co-founder of the Magic Castle and the Academy of Magical Arts
- Irene Latham (born 1971), American author
- Irène Laure (1898–1987), French socialist activist and politician
- Irene Heng Lauvsnes (born 1968), Norwegian politician
- Irene Leache (1839–1900), American teacher
- Irene Leigh, British dermatologist
- Irene Lemos, British classical archaeologist
- Irene Lentle (1912–2003), British table tennis player
- Irene Lentz (1901–1962), American fashion and film costume designer, known simply as "Irene"
- Irene Leverton (1927–2017), American pilot
- Irene Lewisohn (1886–1944), American philanthropist
- Irene Li, Boston based chef and restaurateur
- Irène Lidova, (1907–2002), Russian-French dance critic
- Irene Lieblich (1923–2008), Polish-American painter
- Irene Lim, several people
- Irene Lindh (born 1945), Swedish actress and singer
- Irène de Lipkowski (1898–1995), French politician
- Irene Lisboa (1892–1958), Portuguese novelist
- Irene Logan (born 1984), Liberian-Ghanaian singer
- Irene Loizate (born 1995), Spanish cyclist
- Irene D. Long (1950–2020), American aerospace physician
- Irene Longman (1877–1964), Australian politician
- Irene López (footballer), Spanish footballer
- Irene Loughlin (born 1967), Canadian artist
- Irene Lozano (born 1971), Spanish writer and journalist
- Irene Lusztig (born 1974), British-American filmmaker
- Irene Luxbacher (born 1970), Canadian artist, author and illustrator
- Irene MacDonald (1931–2002), Canadian diver
- Irene Maguire (1929–2016), American figure skater
- Irène Major (born 1979), British-Cameroonian fashion model and musical artist
- Irene Rima Makaryk, Canadian English-language academic
- Irene Mambilima (1952–2021), 7th Chief Justice of Zambia
- Irene Manjeri, Ugandan pastor
- Irene Mann (1929–1996), German dancer, actress and choreographer
- Irene Manning (1912–2004), American actress and singer
- Irene Manton (1904–1988), British botanist
- Irene Marcos (born 1960), Filipino exile
- Irene Marcuse, American author of mystery novels
- Irene Martínez (1944–2014), Cuban track and field athlete
- Irene Martínez (gymnast) (born 1966), Spanish gymnast
- Irene Mathyssen (born 1951), Canadian politician
- Irene Mawela (born 1940), South African singer and composer
- Irene Mawer, English educator
- Irene McAra-McWilliam, British design researcher and Director of the Glasgow School of Art
- Irene McCormack (1938–1991), Australian Catholic Sister murdered by guerrillas in Peru
- Irene McCulloch (1885–1987), American marine biologist of the 20th century
- Irene McFarland, American aviator
- Irene McGee, American podcaster
- Irene McGugan (born 1952), Scottish politician
- Irene McKinney (1939–2012), American poet
- Irene R. McLeod (1891–c. 1968), British poet, writer and editor
- Irene Mecchi (born 1949), American screenwriter and playwright
- Irene Meichsner, German science journalist and author
- Irène Mélikoff (1917–2009), Russian-French Turkologist
- Irene Miguel-Aliaga, Spanish-British physiologist
- Irene de Miguel (born 1981), Spanish politician
- Irene Miguélez, Spanish footballer
- Irene Mihalic (born 1976), German politician
- Irene Miller, British screenwriter
- Irene Miracle (born 1954), American actress
- Irene Mitchell, Australian actress and theatre director
- Irene Mitterstieler (born 1974), Italian luger
- Irene Mogaka (born 1985), Kenyan long-distance runner
- Irene Moillen, Swiss para-alpine skier
- Irène Molitor (1927–2018), Swiss alpine skier
- Irene Molloy (born 1978), American actress, singer and songwriter
- Irene Molyneux (1923–2019), English lawn bowls player
- Irene Monaco, Italian Paralympic competitor
- Irène Monesi, French writer
- Irene Montalà (born 1976), Spanish actress
- Irene Montero (born 1988), Spanish politician and psychologist
- Irene Montie (1921–2018), American statistician
- Irene Montrucchio (born 1991), Spanish synchronized swimmer
- Irene Moon, American entomologist and musician
- Irene Moorman Blackstone (1872–1944), African-American businesswoman and club member
- Irene Moors (born 1967), Dutch singer and television presenter
- Irene Morales (1865–1890), Chilean soldier
- Irene Moreira (born 1964), Uruguayan lawyer, businesswoman and politician
- Irene Moreno (born 1952), American rower
- Irene Morgan (1917–2007), African-American anti-segregation activist
- Irene Moroz, British applied mathematician
- Irene Morra (1893–1978), American film editor
- Irene Moss (born 1948), Australian solicitor and public servant
- Irene Mossop (1904–1988), British writer
- Irene Mounce, Canadian mycologist
- Irene Mountbatten, Marchioness of Carisbrooke (1890–1956), British noblewoman
- Irene Mullen (1914–1981), Canadian swimmer
- Irene Müller (born 1942), East German pair skater
- Irene Muloni (born 1960), Ugandan politician
- Irene Mulvey, American mathematician
- Irene Mulyagonja, Ugandan lawyer and judge
- Irene Patricia Murphy Keeley (born 1944), American judge
- Irene Mutsila (1949–2017), South African politician
- Irene Koki Mutungi (born 1976), Kenyan aviator
- Irene Muyanga (born 1943), Ugandan sprinter
- Irene Zin Mar Myint (born 1990), Burmese pop singer
- Irene Napier (born 1953), Scottish makeup designer
- Irene Jai Narayan (1932–2011), Fijian politician
- Irene Natividad (born 1948), Filipino-American women's rights activist
- Irene Neal, American painter
- Irene Nelson (born 1972), Russian singer, songwriter and record producer
- Irene Neverla, Austrian professor
- Irene Ng (politician) (born 1963), Singaporean politician
- Irene Ng (born 1974), former American actor
- Irene Mrembo Njoki, Kenyan politician
- Irene Lange Nordahl (born 1968), Norwegian politician
- Irene Nordli (born 1967), Norwegian artist
- Irene Ntale (born 1989), Ugandan musician
- Irene Núñez (born 1987), Panamanian model and beauty pageant titleholder
- Irene Obera (born 1933), American track and field athlete
- Irene Oguiza (born 2000), Spanish footballer
- Irene Ogus, English table tennis player
- Irene Ogutu (born 1987), Kenyan footballer
- Irene Ojala (born 1960), Norwegian politician
- Irene Oldfather (born 1954), Scottish politician
- Irene Gut Opdyke (1918–2003), Polish Righteous Among the Nations
- Irene Osgood (1875–1922), American poet
- Irene Otieno (born 1986), American football player
- Irene Ovonji-Odida (born 1964), Ugandan lawyer, politician, and women's rights activist
- Irene Pacheco (born 1971), Colombian boxer
- Irene Papas (1929–2022), Greek actress
- Irene Paredes (born 1991), Spanish footballer
- Irene Parenti Duclos (1754–1795), Italian artist
- Irene Parlby (1868–1965), Canadian politician
- Irene E. Parmelee (1847–1934), American painter
- Irene Levine Paull (1908–1981), American writer and labor activist
- Irene Pavloska, American opera singer
- Irene Bowder Peacock (1892–1978), South African tennis player
- Irene C. Peden (1925–2025), American engineer
- Irene Peirano Garrison, American philologist
- Irene Pepinghege (born 1941), German canoeist
- Irene Pepperberg (born 1949), American scientist noted for her studies in animal cognition
- Irene Pérez, Chicana muralist
- Irene Perveen (born 1940), Pakistani film playback singer
- Irene Peslikis (1943–2002), American feminist artist and activist
- Irene de Peyré (1874–1968), Guatemalan educator and feminist
- Irene Pijoan (1953–2004), Swiss-born American painter, sculptor, and educator
- Irene Flunser Pimentel (born 1950), Portuguese historian of the 20th century
- Irene Piotrowski (1941–2020), Lithuanian-Canadian athlete
- Irene Pirie (1914–1998), Canadian swimmer
- Irène Pittelioen (1927–2011), French gymnast
- Irene Pivetti (born 1963), Italian politician
- Irene Pnevmatikos, Australian politician
- Irene Pollin (1924–2020), American sports executive
- Irene Polo (1909–1942), Spanish journalist, publicist and translator
- Irène Popard (1894–1950), French choreographer
- Irène Possemiers (born 1934), Belgian swimmer
- Irene Prador (1911–1996), Austrian actress and writer
- Irene Prescott (born 1994), Tongan swimmer
- Irini Psyhrami, Greek pop singer
- Irene Purcell (1896–1972), American actress
- Irène Pusterla (born 1988), Swiss long jumper
- Irene Rathbone (1892–1980), novelist
- Irene Ravache (born 1944), Brazilian actress
- Irene Victoria Read, Australian charity and community worker
- Irene Reed (1931–2005), American anthropologist, linguist and educator
- Irene Reid (1930–2008), American jazz singer
- Irene Reyes-Noguerol, Spanish writer
- I. Rice Pereira (1902–1971), American abstract artist, poet and philosopher
- Irene Rich (1891–1988), American actress
- Irene Richards, New Zealand painter
- Irene Rigau (born 1951), Spanish politician
- Irene del Río, Spanish footballer
- Irene Roberts (born 1983), American mezzo-soprano
- Irene Robertson (1931–1994), American hurdler
- Irene Robledo (1890–1988), Mexican educator and humanist
- Irene Rocas i Romaguera, Catalan folklorist and lexicographer
- E. Irene Rood (1843–1921), founder of the Chicago Audubon Society
- Irene Rooke (1874–1958), English actress
- Irene Rosenfeld (born 1953), American businesswoman
- Irene Rousseau (born 1941), American artist
- Irene S. Rubin (born 1945), American political scientist
- Irene Ruhnke (1920–1999), baseball player
- Irene Runge (born 1942), American-German-Jewish sociologist and writer
- Irene E. Ryan (1909–1997), American aviator, engineer, geologist, government official and politician
- Irene Ryan (1902–1973), American actress
- Irene Ryder, Hong Kong musical artist
- Irene Sabadini, Italian mathematician
- Irene Sabatini, Zimbabwean writer
- Irene Sabido, Mexican producer and writer
- Irene Saez (born 1961), Venezuelan politician and former Miss Universe
- Irene Salemka (1931–2017), Canadian opera singer
- Irene Saltern (1911–2005), German-born American costume and fashion designer
- Irene Sánchez-Escribano (born 1992), Spanish athletics competitor
- Irene Sandiford-Garner (born 1961), Barbadian politician
- Irene Sänger-Bredt (1911–1983), German engineer, mathematician and physicist
- Irene Sankoff, Canadian librettist and composer
- Irene Santiago, Filipina peace negotiator and women's advocate
- Irene Sargent (1852–1932), American art historian
- Irene Gonzaga Sarmento (born 1986), East Timorese politician
- Irene Saunders, American lexicographer
- Irene Savidge (1905–1985), English factory worker and subject of police interrogation scandal
- Irene Scharrer (1888–1971), English classical pianist
- Irene Schloss, Argentine Antarctic researcher
- Irene Schmidt, Dutch para table tennis player
- Irene H. Schöne (born 1942), German environmental economist
- Irene Schoof, Dutch cricketer
- Irene Schori (born 1983), Swiss curler
- Irene Schouten (born 1992), Dutch speed skater
- Irene Schroeder (1909–1931), American murderer
- Irene Schuch (1935–2023), German discus thrower
- Irène Schweizer (1941–2024), Swiss jazz and free improvising pianist
- Irene Sciriha, Maltese mathematician
- Irene F. Scott (1912–1997), American Tax Court judge
- Irene Scruggs (1901–1981), American singer
- Irene Mayer Selznick (1907–1990), American theatre producer
- Irene Sewankambo, Ugandan electrical engineer
- Irene Sharaff (1910–1993), American costume designer
- Irene Shepard (1922–2014), American politician
- Irene Shin, Virginia politician
- Irene Shubik (1929–2019), British television producer and story editor
- Irene Siegel, American artist
- Irene Siragusa (born 1993), Italian sprinter
- Irene Skliva (born 1978), Miss World 1996
- Irène Skorik (1924/1928–2006), French ballet dancer, actress and composer
- Iréne Slättengren (born 1952), Swedish equestrian
- Irene Sloan (1942–2008), American journalist
- Irene Smart (1921–2017), American politician
- Irene Solà (born 1990), Spanish writer and an artist
- Irene Spencer (1937–2017), American author
- Irene di Spilimbergo (1538–1559), Italian painter
- Irene Spry (1907–1998), Canadian economist
- Irene Staunton, Zimbabwean publisher and editor
- Irène Stecyk (born 1937), Belgian writer
- Irene Steer (1889–1977), British swimmer
- Irene Stefani (1891–1930), 20th-century Italian Catholic religious sister
- Irene Stegun (1919–2008), American politician
- Irene Stelling (born 1971), Danish footballer
- Irene Monat Stern, Polish-American painter
- Irene Steyn (born 1977), Namibian cyclist
- Irene Stoehr (1941–2023), German journalist
- Irene Stolofsky (1896–1950), American violinist
- Irene Strong (1929–2018), Canadian swimmer
- Irene Strychalski, American comic book writer
- Irene Kharisma Sukandar (born 1992), Indonesian chess player
- Irene Sunters (1928–2005), Scottish actress
- Irene Sutcliffe (1924–2019), English actress
- Irène Sweyd (born 1940), Belgian swimmer
- Irene Barnes Taeuber (1906–1974), American demographer
- Irene Tamborra, Italian particle astrophysicist
- Irene Tarimo (born 1964), Tanzanian scientist, biologist and educator
- Irene Frances Taylor (1890–1933), Australian journalist and activist
- Irene S. Taylor (1902–1989), American journalist and public information specialist
- Irene Taylor (1906–1988), American singer
- Irene Taylor (filmmaker) (born 1970), American director and producer
- Irene Tedrow (1907–1995), American character actress
- Irini Terzoglou (born 1979), Greek shot putter
- Irene Thomas (1920–2001), British radio personality
- Irène Tiendrébéogo (born 1977), Burkinabé-Monegasque athlete
- Irene Tinagli (born 1974), Italian economist and politician
- Irene Tinker (born 1927), American economist
- Irene Tobar (born 1989), Ecuadorian footballer
- Irène Tolleret (born 1967), French politician
- Irene Tomaszewski, Canadian writer, editor and translator
- Irene Naa Torshie Addo (born 1970), Ghanaian politician and lawyer
- Irene Tracey (born 1966), British neuroscientist
- Irène de Trebert (1921–1996), French singer, dancer and actress
- Irene Treppler (1926–2012), American politician
- Irene Triplett (1930–2020), last recipient of an American Civil War pension
- Irene Tripod, British actress
- Irene Trowell-Harris (born 1939), United States Air Force general
- Irene Tsu (born 1945), American actress
- Irene Tu, American comedian, actor and writer
- Irene Tucker, American literary critic and theorist
- Irène Tunc (1935–1972), French actress
- Irene Tupuna, Cook Islander lawn bowler
- Irene Uchida (1917–2013), Canadian scientist and Down Syndrome researcher
- Irene Usabiaga (born 1993), Spanish cyclist
- Irene Uwoya (born 1988), Tanzanian actress and businesswoman
- Irene Vallejo (born 1979), Spanish writer and academic
- Irene van den Broek (born 1980), Dutch cyclist
- Irene van Dyk (born 1972), New Zealand netball player
- Irene van der Reijken, Dutch athlete
- Irene van Renswoude, Dutch historian
- Irene van Zyl (born 1984), Namibian cricketer
- Irene Vanbrugh (1872–1949), English actress
- Irene Vecchi (born 1989), Italian fencer
- Irene Vélez Torres, Minister of Mines and Energy of Colombia (2022–present)
- Irène Vernal (1912–2008), Belgian actress
- Irene Vernon (1922–1998), American actress
- Irene Sue Vernon, American professor
- Irene Viaene (born 1949), Argentine alpine skier
- Irene Vilar, Puerto Rican writer
- Irene Villa (born 1978), Spanish author and journalist
- Irene Visedo (born 1978), Spanish actress
- Irene B. Vogel, American linguist
- Irene von Chavanne (1863–1938), Austrian opera singer
- Irene von Fladung, Austrian opera singer
- Irene von Meyendorff (1916–2001), Russian-born German-British actress
- Irene Vorrink (1918–1996), Dutch politician
- Irene Wagner-Döbler, German microbiologist
- Irene Wan (born 1966), Hong Kong actress and singer
- Irene Wang (born 1986), Hong Kong model and actress
- Irene Ward (1895–1980), British Conservative Party politician
- Irene Ware (1910–1993), American actress
- Irene N. Watts (1931–2023), German-born Canadian writer and educator
- Irene Weir, American artist and art educator
- Irene Wellington (1904–1984), British calligrapher and teacher
- Irene Whittome (born 1942), Canadian multimedia artist
- Irene Williams, American artist
- Irene J. Winter (born 1940), American art historian
- Irene Woodall (1946–2015), American journalist
- Irene Worth (1916–2002), American actress
- Irene Wosikowski (1910–1944), German political activist
- Irene Wrenner, American politician
- Irene Aloha Wright (1879–1972), American historian
- Irene Xavier (born 1951), Malaysian activist
- Irene Yah-Ling Sun, American actor and collector
- Irene Young Mattox (1881–1970), American Christian speaker and educator
- Irene Vera Young (1895–1975), Australian dancer and dance educator
- Irene Zazians (1927–2012), Iranian actress
- Irene Zechner, Austrian luger
- Irena Zemanová (born 1977), Czech figure skater
- Irène Zilahy (1904–1944), Hungarian actress
- Irene Zisblatt (born 1929), Carpathian-American Holocaust survivor
- Irene M. Zoppi (born 1966), Brigadier General, United States Army Reservist
- Irene Zundel, Mexican sculptor, painter and photographer
- Irène Zurkinden (1909–1987), Swiss painter
- Mother Irini (1936–2006), Egyptian abbess
