= Schöne =

Schöne is a German surname. Notable people with the surname include:

- Albrecht Schöne (1925–2025), German Germanist
- Alfons Schöne, German Olympic fencer
- Barbara Schöne (born 1947), German actress
- Georg Schöne (1875–1960), German physician
- Irene H. Schöne (born 1942), German economist and politician
- Lasse Schöne (born 1986), Danish footballer
- Lotte Schöne (1891–1977), Austrian soprano
- Maja Schöne (born 1976), German actress
- Max Schöne (1880–1961), German swimmer
- Reiner Schöne (born 1942), German actor
- Richard Schöne (1840–1922), German archaeologist and philologist
- Sabine Schöne (born 1974), German squash player
- Wolfgang Schöne (born 1940), German bass-baritone

== See also ==
- Die schöne Müllerin a German song cycle
- Schöne Bescherung a German song
