= Irene Lim =

Irene Lim may refer to:

- Irene Lim (actress)
- Irene Lim (fashion designer)
