= Irene Diaz =

American singer-songwriter

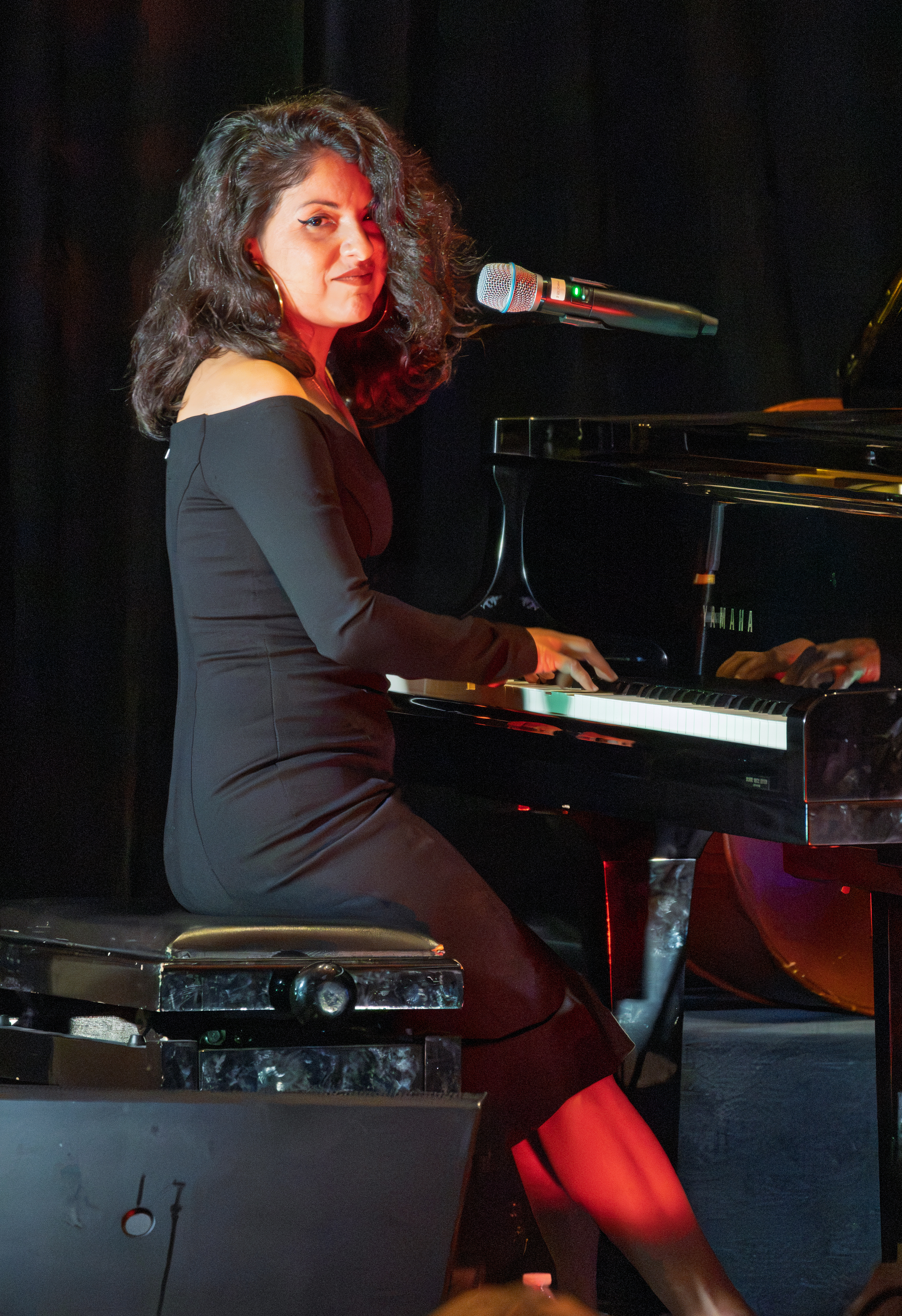
- Diaz performing in 2026

Background information
- Genre: Torch song
- Occupation: Singer-songwriter
- Instruments: Vocals; guitar; piano
- Years active: 2011–
- Website: Official Website; Irene Diaz on facebook

Irene Diaz is a singer-songwriter from Los Angeles.

== Career ==
In late 2011 Irene Diaz began a career move making her way into the music scene playing at various venues around the Los Angeles area.

In July 2013, Irene Diaz released first EP I Love You Madly by successfully fundraising through Kickstarter. In December 2013, NPR's Alt.Latino referred to Irene Diaz's music as one of Alt.Latino's favorites of 2013 and "She is pretty amazing".

In May 2015, Irene Diaz performed at Pachanga Latino Music Festival, when Alt.Latino referred to Irene Diaz's music as "It's really powerful. It's strong music. It's soft, but quiet storm".

== Discography ==
=== Singles and EPs ===
- I Love You Madly (2013)
- This Cannot Be (2016)

=== Albums ===
- Lovers & Friends (2021)
