= Irene Loughlin =

Canadian artist

- Born: May 20, 1967 (age 59); Hamilton, Ontario
- Education: Ontario College of Art; Simon Fraser University
- Occupations: Artist, Writer, Instructor, Cultural Worker

Irene Loughlin was born on May 20, 1967, in Hamilton, Canada. Loughlin is known for her performance artwork, writings, drawings and cultural work.

== Biography ==
Her art embodies images of feminism, health activism, and anti-poverty movements. Over the last twenty years, the artworks created have focused further on images challenging many social constructs such as mental illness, visual metaphors of medical treatment, and ecological landscapes. She created this work as a contemporary emotive discourse. The works of art stem from images drawn from Loughlin's experiences or as witnessed throughout her life, in relation to childhood, spiritualism, labour, exercise, depression, diagnosis, sexual abuse, processed foods, rehabilitation, happiness, nourishment, hope, class distinction, sexuality, desire, speech, addiction, therapy, silence, and historical re-enactments.

Loughlin further developed her practice as an artist in Vancouver in the historic Downtown Eastside neighborhood. She has contributed to the activist and disability community through Gallery Gachet, VANDU, and the Carnegie Centre. Loughlin has presented her work in multiple national and international contexts. Her most recent performance was at The Month Performance Art Berlin at the Enabled Manifesto Project. This was a workshop was culminated in a collective, corporeal manifesto that focused on disability and neurodiversity.

Irene Loughlin recently worked as an instructor in Interdisciplinary Practice, Intermedia and Foundation Studio, at Brock University.

== Education ==
- University of Toronto, Honors Masters of Visual Studies, Spring 2009 - 2007
- Simon Fraser University, Bachelor of Fine Arts, 2005 - 2003
- Ontario College of Art, General Studies Diploma AOCA, 1985 - 1989
- NSCAD Summer Studio Program NY, Summer 1989

== Works ==
*_{These images are all accredited to Irene Loughlin and were retrieved from, Irene Loughlin PDF as cited.*}

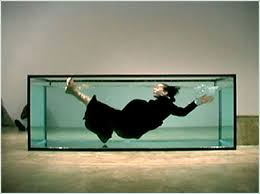
light as a feather heavy as lead

The image "light as a feather heavy as lead." is a video work reflecting upon the prosecution of women in the 13th to the 17th century. Specifically focusing in on the practice of identifying and murdering women who were accused of witchcraft in North and European America. There was an oral element to this piece as well. The oral element featured young girls reciting a levation spell. The performance was done with the help of artist Victor Vega at Klaus Steinmetz Gallery in Costa Rica.

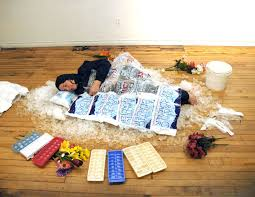
Ayles Ice Shlef

This image is, grieving/separated from Ayles Ice Shelf." It was presented several times including at Htmlles, Studio XX, in Montreal, 2005. The work was created as a way to speak about the separation of the Ayles Ice shelffrom the North Pole in 2005. This piece embodies the frustration and futility felt by an individual who is facing global warming and its consequences. In this performance, the human body interacts with materials that are associated with separation and migration of the Ayles Ice Shelf.

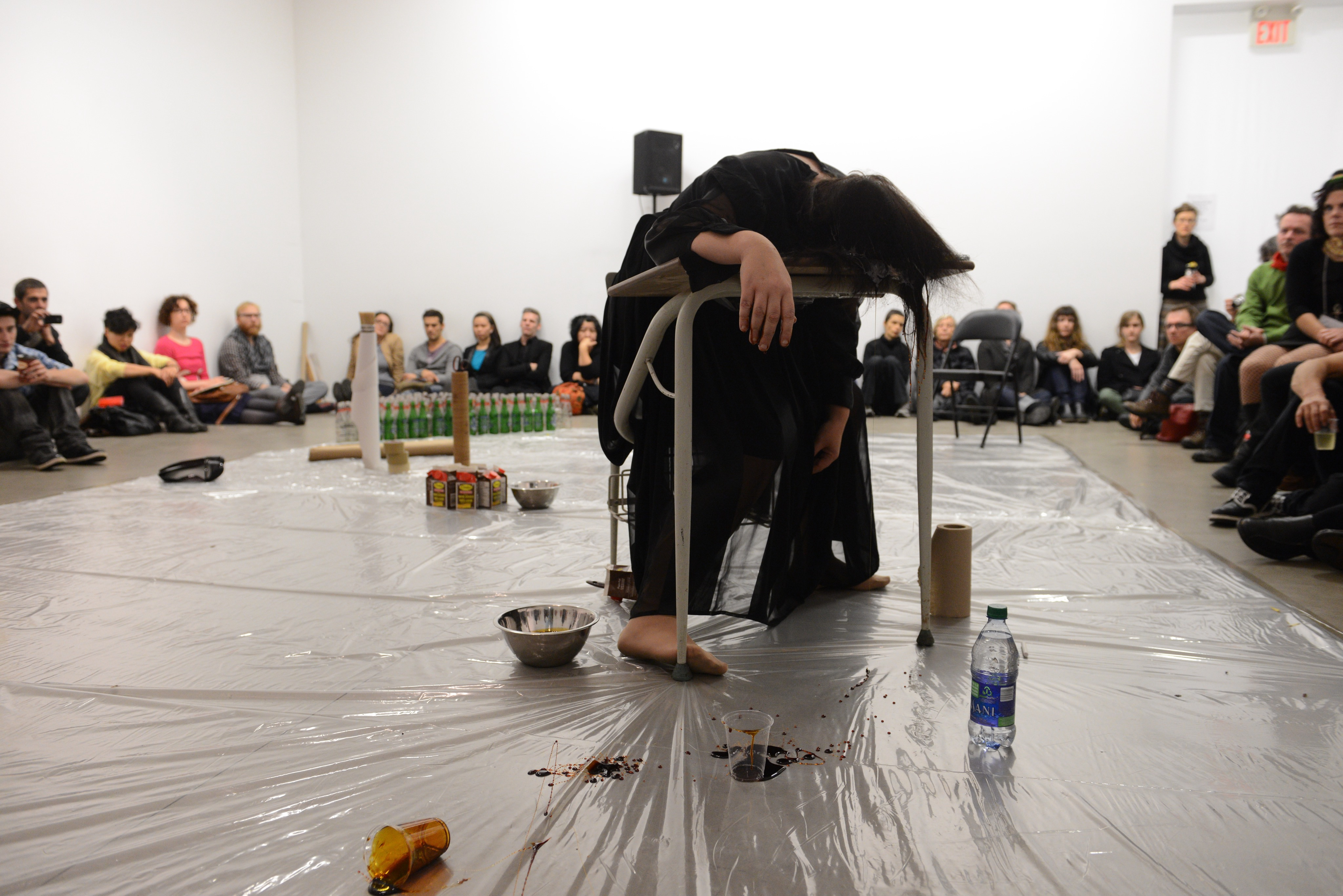
7a11d Toronto

This image remains untitled and was created in 2012, by Loughlin and curated by Shannon Cochrane. This performance explored the mental illness she experienced as a child and a young adult. The work is to represent the feelings of anxiety, depression, and dissociation. It included actions of resistance and also succumbed to the social constructs that surrounded understanding mental illness in 2012. It was presented at the 7a11d festival in 2012.

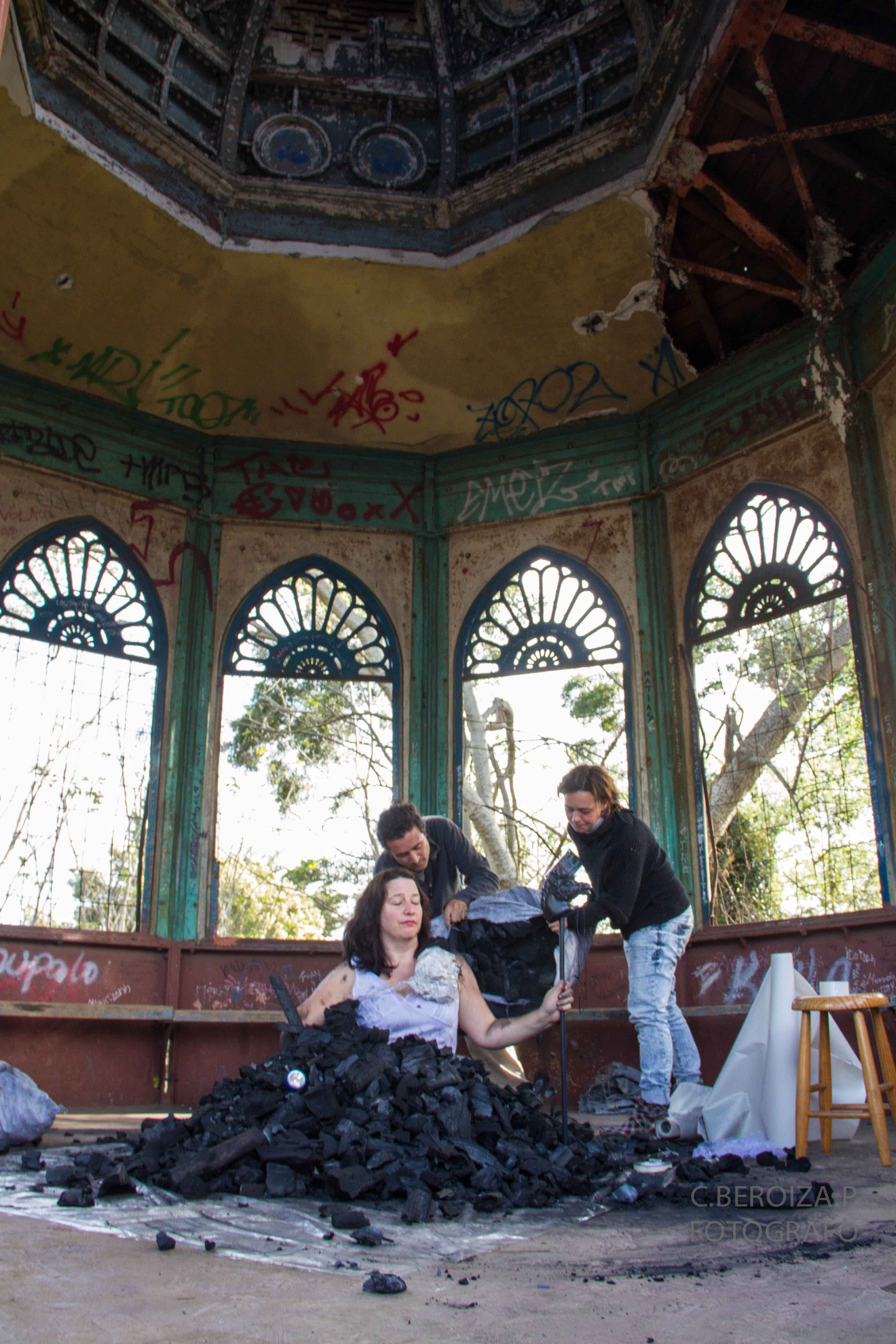

The image to the right was conducted at EPI International Performance center in Chile, 2012. It was created by Irene Loughlin and curated by Alperoa Lota. Here Loughlin is buried by materials from the earth and work of Lota - coal. It is to resemble the industrial material that is seen with mining and as a way of heating homes. This performance art is critical of the colonialization of the area, and the treatment of workers by the elite. Irene speaks of this piece as also being influenced by the aesthetics of having been born in the industrial steel city of Hamilton, where she spent her formative years.

== Awards ==
2005 Victor Martyn Lynch-Staunton Award
