= Irene Blanco Becerra =

Mexican politician

- Born: 16 May 1946 (age 80); Cancún, Quintana Roo, Mexico
- Occupation: Politician
- Political party: PAN

Irene Herminia Blanco Becerra (born 16 May 1946) is a Mexican politician affiliated with the National Action Party. As of 2014 she served as Deputy of the LIX Legislature of the Mexican Congress as a plurinominal representative.
