= Irene Rima Makaryk =

Canadian English-language academic

Irene (Irena) Rima Makaryk is a Canadian English-language academic, author, and distinguished professor at the University of Ottawa.

== Education ==
Makaryk earned a bachelor of arts degree (1974), a master of arts degree (1975), and a PhD (1980), all from the University of Toronto.

== Career ==
Makaryk joined the University of Ottawa in 1981 and was given the rank of distinguished professor in 2018; she teaches English at the faculty of arts. She is also the vice-dean of the faculty of graduate and postdoctoral studies.

Her research focusses on theatrical modernism, Shakespeare, Ukrainian Shakespeare, the arts in times of war, Soviet theatre, Les Kurbas, cultural history, and Arctic diaries.

Makaryk appeared on the Canadian Broadcasting Company's Ideas (radio show) on November 3, 2021.

=== Selected publications ===
- Irena Makaryk and Diana Brydon (editors), Shakespeare in Canada: A World Elsewhere, University of Toronto Press, 2002 ISBN 978-0-8020-3655-1
- Irena Makaryk, April in Paris: Theatricality, Modernism, and Politics at the 1925 Art Deco Expo. University of Toronto Press, 2018
- Irena Makaryk, Encyclopedia of Contemporary Literary Theory: Approaches, Scholars, Terms, University of Toronto Press, 1993 ISBN 978-0-8020-6860-6
- Irena R. Makaryk, About the Harrowing of Hell: A Seventeenth-Century Ukrainian Play in Its European Context, Dovehouse Editions 1989 ISBN 978-0-919473-89-8
- Irena Makaryk and Virlana Tkacz, Modernism in Kyiv: Jubilant Experimentation, University of Toronto Press, 2010
