= Irene Benneweis =

Acrobat and circus director

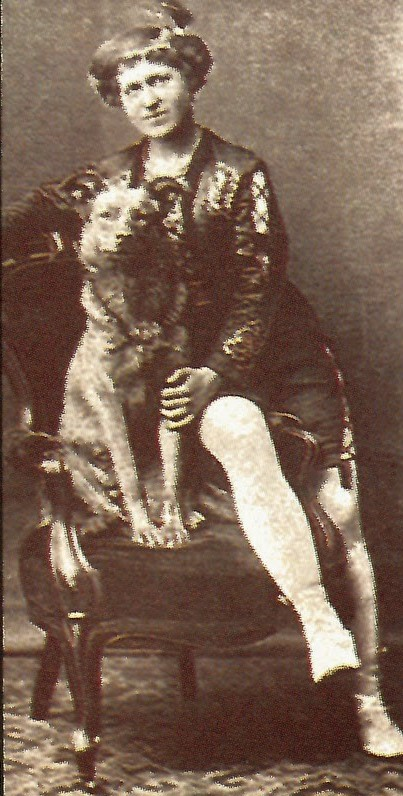
- Born: Karen Christine Irene Petersen; November 26, 1891; Nakskov
- Died: May 12, 1970 (aged 78); Dronningmølle
- Known for: circus performer

Karen Christine Irene Benneweis née Petersen (1891–1970) was a Danish circus acrobat and circus director. From childhood performed on the tightrope and the trapeze. In 1910, she joined Circus Benneweis and married its director, Ferdinand Benneweis, in 1915. Thanks to her education, she successfully developed the circus in the 1930s. After her husband's death in 1945, she became its director, drawing on the assistance of her adopted son Eli who eventually took control in 1956.

== Early life ==
Born in Nakskov on 26 November 1891, Karen Christine Irene Petersen was the daughter of Hans Peter Petersen and Anna Mathilde Vilhelmine née Schlander. Shortly after her birth, she and her mother moved to Kiel where her grandfather was an architect. When she reached school age, they moved back to Denmark where she attended school.

While still a small child, she became interested in the five brothers and four sisters known as Daucke Brødrene (the Daucke Brothers) who performed as acrobats. She proved to be a talented tightrope artist, making her debut in 1899 when only eight. She soon went on to perform on the trapeze. In 1906, she returned to live with her mother in Odense, intending to continue her education. But she soon joined the Dauckes again, this time performing with their small Cirkus v. Barner.

== Career with Cirkus Benneweis ==
In 1910, she joined the Cirkus Benneweis, at the time a small family circus. Hit by entertainment tax and trying to operate a travelling cinema on the side, it was experiencing difficult times. In January 1915, she married Ferdinand Benneweis, the eldest son of the owner Gottfried Benneweis. Thanks to her education, she was able to help with administration as none of the Benneweis could read or write. After Gottfried died in 1933 and his wife, Marie, in 1935, Irene Benneweis took on the role of director. In 1937, she succeeded in receiving royal approval for the circus which represented a reduction of entertainment tax from 40% to 20%. She also persuaded her husband to invest in a large new tent, putting his horses up as collateral for a bank loan. This proved to be a turning point for the circus which in 1939 was able to buy property in Dronningmølle in the north of Zealand as winter quarters.

Irene and Ferdinand had not children of their own but in 1916 they adopted Eli Benneweis who was barely accepted by the rest of the family. When Ferdinand died in 1945, Irene brought him back and encouraged him to participate in management. As he proved to be a talented manager, in 1956 Irene withdrew and Eli became the new director, buying out his mother's remaining interests.

Irene Benneweis died in Dronningmølle on 12 May 1970. She was buried in Nyhuse Cemetery, Hillerød.
