= Irene Lange Nordahl =

Norwegian politician

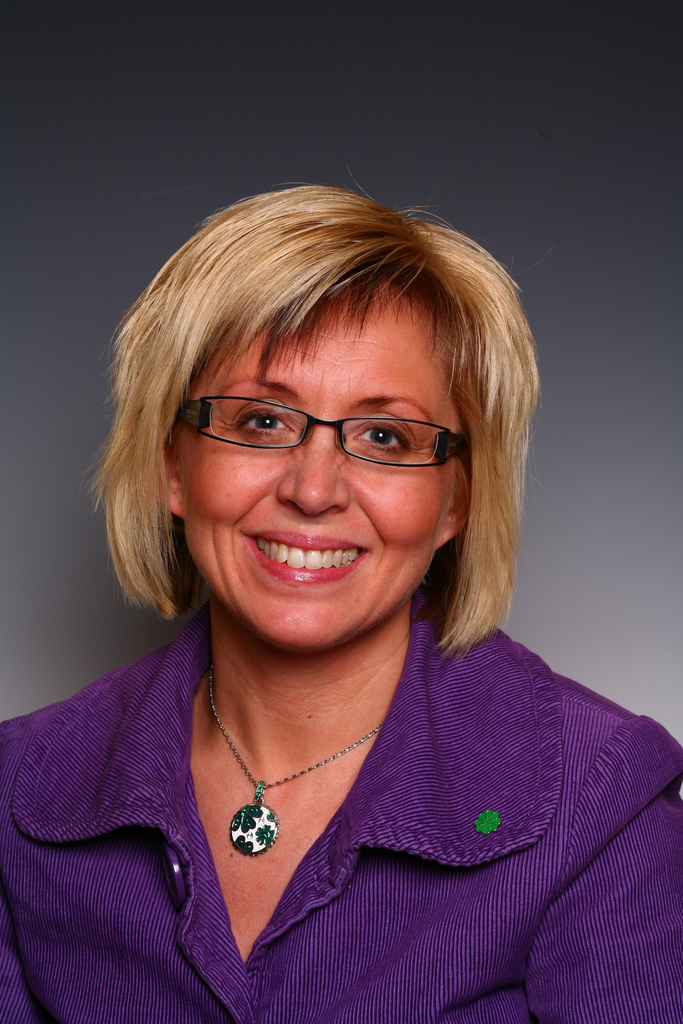
Irene Lange Nordahl

Irene Lange Nordahl (born 11 February 1968 in Sørreisa Municipality) is a Norwegian politician representing the Centre Party. In the 2009 election, she was elected to parliament from Troms, and serves on the Standing Committee on Business and Industry, and is the Center Party's spokesperson on commerce issues.

Prior to her election to parliament, Nordahl served in the county council for Troms, and was the county councilor on commerce between 2005 and 2007. She served for ten years on the municipal council for Sørreisa Municipality, including time as the chairman of the council.

In the 2009 election campaign, Nordahl was nominated as her party's top candidate. She campaigned on expanding the travel industry in northern Norway, this involved improving the road network, and supporting a railway line through Troms. Her campaign was energetic and highly visible. In the end she succeeded in winning Troms' leveling seat, narrowly ahead of Lena Jensen of the Socialist Left.
