= Irene Saunders =

American lexicographer

- Born: United States
- Education: Chemist
- Occupation: Author
- Spouse: Lynn C. Saunders

Irene Saunders is the author of the English-Chinese dictionary The Right Word in Chinese or Hànyǔ Zhǐnán.

== Biography ==
Saunders graduated from West Virginia University with a degree in chemistry. She is married to Lynn C. Saunders, Vice President-Executive Director in the People's Republic of China for Westing House Electric S.A., a company that funded the creation of the dictionary.

The Right Word in Chinese is a dictionary that is the first of its kind with Pinyin romanization of the Putonghua language or Modern-day Standard Mandarin Chinese published in 1985. It evolved from Irene Saunders' experience of working in China while having a limited knowledge of Mandarin Chinese. The proceeds of the dictionary were donated to the China Wildlife Conservation Association (CWCA), particularly for the endangered panda. It later became one of the sources for many modern-day English–Chinese / Chinese–English dictionaries.
