= Georg Schöne =

Transplantation immunologist (b. 1875, d. 1960)

Georg Schöne (14 November 1875 – 1 February 1960) was a German physician from Berlin who is considered the first transplantation immunologist for his discovery that the body's own system causes transplant rejection. His 1912 book Heteroplastische und Homoplastische Transplantation summarized his research.
