= Irene Young Mattox =

American Christian speaker and educator

- Born: December 31, 1881; Seymour, Texas, U.S.
- Died: June 20, 1970 (aged 88); Lubbock, Texas, U.S.

Irene Young Mattox (Dec. 31, 1881 – June 20, 1970) and her husband Judge Perry Mattox were very active in Churches of Christ in Texas and Oklahoma. In 1927 she gave a presentation titled "A Christian Woman's Responsibility", which addressed the issues of women being silent in the church, and that they should be able and prepared to preach and teach other women in the church. She spearheaded the teaching of women's Bible classes.

== Biography ==
Irene Young was a schoolteacher in Greenville, Texas, and after her marriage to Perry Mattox in 1904 they moved around Texas and Oklahoma, eventually settling in Bristow, Oklahoma. She and her husband established four active Churches of Christ congregations, two in Texas and two in Oklahoma, all of which began in their home.

During her life, Irene Young Mattox organized and served as the president of Oklahoma City's Big Sisters, founded and served as the president of the Oklahoma Parent-Teacher Association, and was the president of the Federated Bible Club. She also strongly supported Christian higher-education, and helped to establish three different women's organizations to raise support for Christian schools. The organizations are: Stepping Stones at Oklahoma Christian College, Associated Women of Pepperdine, and Lubbock Christian College Associations. She has been recognized for her work in several different ways. In 1963 James O. Baird, the president of Oklahoma Christian College, presented her with a plaque to honor her work with Christian Colleges; in 1967 the Stepping Stones dedicated their cookbook to her; in 1968 she received the annual Christian Services Award from Pepperdine University; and in 1969 20th Century Christian presented her with their "Woman of the Year" award.

Her son F. W. Mattox was the founding president of Lubbock Christian University, and her daughter Helen Mattox Young was the first lady of Pepperdine University as wife of president M. Norvel Young.
