= Irene Williams =

American artist (1920–2015)

Irene Williams (1920–2015) was an American artist. She is associated with the Gee's Bend quilting collective, although she made her quilts "in solitude" and "uninfluenced." Her work has been exhibited at the Museum of Fine Arts, Houston and the Frist Art Museum, and is included in the collections of the Philadelphia Museum of Art, the Indianapolis Museum of Art, the Museum of Fine Arts Boston, and the National Gallery of Art.

== Life ==
Irene Williams was the daughter of Sandy and Tom Williams. She grew up on a farm with common crops like cotton, watermelon, etc. They also raised various livestock.

She completed school until the ninth grade. At seventeen, she married Cornelius Williams, a man whom she adored, and together they raised six children – three boys and three girls. One of her sons died young, trying to save a logging truck driver from his wrecked vehicle.

Williams' sister-in-law was fellow quilter, Liza Jane Williams.

== Work ==
Williams did not begin making quilts until she was married and began to have children. Although members of her family and community made quilts, Williams always quilted alone in her house. having never participated in quilting bees, William's style developed on its own, uninfluenced by her peers.

In "Strips," created around 1960, Williams deconstructed used basketball jerseys to form a quilt that mimics a street map, with a main street lined with houses with street numbers.

Her "Vote" quilt, a housetop-style quilt featuring red, white, and blue fabric strips with the word "vote" printed on them, was inspired by Dr. Martin Luther King, Jr.'s 1965 visit to Gee's Bend.

Williams' "Blocks and Strips" quilt features bright colors and irregular, geometric shapes. It is part of the permanent collection at the Philadelphia Museum of Art.
