= Irene Levine Paull =

American writer and labor activist

Paull testifying before the House Un-American Activities Committee in 1963

Irene Levine Paull (April 18, 1908 – August 12, 1981) was a writer and labor activist from Minnesota. She responded to discrimination by fighting for the rights of people who were oppressed. She was active in labor organizing and Communist politics, and she insisted that women could travel and write professionally just as men could. She cofounded the newspaper that became the Minneapolis Labor Review, penned columns under feminine pseudonyms, and wrote poetry, plays, and fiction that addressed themes of injustice.

== Early life and education ==
Irene Levine was born in Duluth, Minnesota on April 18, 1908. Her mother, Eva Zlatkovski Levine, was a Jewish immigrant from a Ukrainian shtetl, or small city Pereiaslav. Her father, Maurice Levine, was the son of Jewish immigrants from the same shtetl. The Levines lived near a large extended family and community from Peryaslov.

Irene Levine Paull's radical politics were formed as a young child. When she began attending public school, gentile students called her anti-Semitic slurs. This experience, she often said, made her identify with the downtrodden. A few years later, a mob in Duluth murdered three African-American men in the 1920 Duluth lynchings. Around the same time, Levine heard about a Jewish man in another state who was lynched under similar conditions. These events made her determined to fight injustice.

In 1925, Levine enrolled in The College of St. Scholastica in Duluth. She wanted to become a writer, and her parents wanted her to assimilate into the middle class. But Levine longed to ride the rails and seek out adventures like male writers did. She dropped out of college, moved to Chicago, and cast her lot with the poor.

== Labor activism and journalism ==
In Chicago, Levine sharply disagreed with other middle class women who worked with the poor. Women like Jane Addams were social workers and reformists. Levine felt that they were policing the poor; she preferred to fight for their economic rights.

Levine returned to Duluth in 1929 and married lawyer Henry Paull. Henry Paull had first proposed when Levine was sixteen, but she said no. After traveling and seeing more of the world, she finally agreed to marry him. Henry shared Irene's radical politics, and they worked together on political campaigns.

In 1937, during the timber worker strike in northern Minnesota, Irene Paull and her cousin Sam Davis founded a newspaper called The Timber Worker. This newspaper later became Midwest Labor, the official regional newspaper of the Congress of Industrial Organizations (CIO), a large labor union.

Paull wrote regular columns for the paper, often signed "Calamity Jane" or "Lumberjack Sue." She used gender strategically in these columns. Sometimes she emphasized the need for women to keep house and have children; other times she wrote with a feistier tone, calling herself a "dangerous woman" and saying that she wanted to give union-bashers a black eye.

She continued writing in the late 1930s and 1940s. She focused on topics like workers' rights, the Spanish Civil War, fascism, and racism in the United States. When folk singers Woody Guthrie and Pete Seeger visited Duluth, they stayed with Irene and Henry. In 1941, a collection of Irene's writing, We're the People, was published.

== Later life ==
In 1947, Henry Paull had a heart attack and died suddenly. The next year, Paull moved to Minneapolis with her two children, Bonnie and Michael.

The 1950s were a difficult time for Paull. Under the leadership of Senator Joseph McCarthy, Communists and those suspected of being Communists faced social and political persecution. Jewish men and women were treated with extra suspicion, and Paull lived in fear that her children would be taken away from her. She worked on the support committee of two Jewish Communists, Julius and Ethel Rosenberg, and she was devastated when they were executed in 1953.

Paull moved to San Francisco after the Rosenberg executions. Her experience with anti-Semitism during the McCarthy Era made her reconnect with her Jewish heritage, and she began writing for magazines like Jewish Currents. In 1962, she was forced to testify before the House Committee on Un-American Activities, another Congressional effort to attack radicals. She made a brief statement only to say that she would not respond to their harassment and ridicule. Paull remained an activist until her death, supporting the Civil Rights Movement and opposing the Vietnam War. She died in 1981.
