= Irene Wagner-Döbler =

German Microbiologist

- Education: LMU Munich, Technical University of Braunschweig
- Scientific career
- Fields: Microbiology, Biology
- Workplaces: Technical University of Braunschweig
- Thesis: (1984)

Irene Wagner-Döbler is a German microbiologist and associate professor of biology at the Institute of Microbiology, Technical University of Braunschweig.

== Career ==
Irene Wagner-Döbler studied biology at LMU Munich and obtained her PhD in 1984 with a thesis in aquatic ecology. In 2001, she obtained her habilitation at the Technical University of Braunschweig. Her habilitation dealt with the detoxification of mercury-containing wastewater using a newly discovered Pseudomonas putida strain and a bioreactor specifically developed for this purpose. For this work she received the "Stifterverband Science Award - Erwin-Schrödinger Preis" of the Helmholtz-Association of German Research Centers in 2001.

As a research group leader at the Helmholtz Centre for Infection Research (2004-2018) and associate professor at the Technical University Braunschweig (from 2007) AG Wagner-Döbler, she focused on microbial communication, in particular quorum sensing and algal-bacterial interactions in the ocean (Roseobacter Transregio).

She is the author of more than 150 scientific papers, with publications including de novo sequencing of the algal symbiont Dinoroseobacter shibae and its dinoflagellate host Prorocentrum cordatum.

== Publications (selected) ==
- H. von Canstein, Y. Li, K. N. Timmis, W.-D. Deckwer and I. Wagner-Döbler: Removal of mercury from chloralkali electrolysis wastewater by a mercury-resistant Pseudomonas putida strain. Applied and Environmental Microbiology, 65(12), 5279-5284, 1999. https://doi.org/10.1128/AEM.65.12.5279-5284.1999
- I. Wagner-Döbler, H. von Canstein, Y. Li, K. N. Timmis, and W.-D. Deckwer: Removal of mercury from chemical wastewater by microoganisms in technical scale. Environmental Science & Technology, 34(21), 4628-4634, 2000. https://doi.org/10.1021/es0000652
- I. Wagner-Döbler and 36 co-authors: The complete genome sequence of the algal symbiont Dinoroseobacter shibae: a hitchhiker's guide to life in the sea. The ISME Journal, 4(1), 61-77, 2010. https://doi.org/10.1038/ismej.2009.94
- H. Sztajer, S. P. Szafranski, J. Tomasch, M. Reck, M. Nimtz, M. Rohde and I. Wagner-Döbler: Cross-feeding and interkingdom communication in dual-species biofilms of Streptococcus mutans and Candida albicans. The ISME Journal, 8(11), 2256-2271, 2014. https://doi.org/10.1038/ismej.2014.73
- K. E. Dougan, Z. Deng, L. Wöhlbrand, C. Reuse, B. Bunk, Y. Chen, J. Hartlich, K.Hiller, U. John, J. Kalvelage, J. Mansky, M. Neumann-Schaal, J. Overmann, J. Petersen, S. Sanchez-Garcia, K. Schmidt-Hohagen, S. Shah, C. Spröer, H. Sztajer, H. Wang, D. Bhattacharya, R. Rabus, D. Jahn, C. Xin Chan, and I. Wagner-Döbler: Multi-omics analysis reveals the molecular response to heat stress in a “red tide” dinoflagellate. BioRxiv 2022, https://doi.org/10.1101/2022.07.25.501386
