= Irene V. Clark =

American artist

- Born: 1927; Washington, D.C.
- Died: 1984 (aged 56–57)
- Known for: painting

Irene V. Clark (1927-1984) was an American painter. She was born in 1927 in Washington, D.C. She studied at the School of the Art Institute of Chicago. While in Chicago she also studied screen printing with William McBride and John F. Miller. She was influenced by the work of the WPA artists. For a time Clark was the gallery director of the Exhibit Gallery and Studio. She relocated to California and exhibited her paintings at the Oakland Museum of California and other galleries in California. Several sources identify her year of death as 1984 but the National Gallery of Art has her death date as 1980.

Clark's work is in the collection of the Oakland Museum, Clark Atlanta University, and the National Gallery of Art.
