= Irene Monat Stern =

Polish-American painter

- Born: 1932
- Died: 2010 (aged 77–78)
- Known for: painting
- Website: https://irenemonatstern.com

Irene Monat Stern (1932-2010) was a Poland-born American artist who spent her working life in the United States. Known for her abstract paintings, her works have been displayed and collected across the United States; from The Esther-Robles Gallery in Los Angeles, to the Metropolitan Museum of Art in New York, to the Hirshhorn Museum and Sculpture Garden in Washington D.C.'s permanent collection.

== Early life and education ==
Stern (née Monat) was born in Poland in 1932, 7 years before the outbreak of World War II. After surviving the Holocaust, a 16-year-old Stern moved to Paris and then to New York, where she met sculptor and future husband, Jan Peter Stern (1926-2004). While living in New York, Stern took art classes at the New York School for Social Research, the Museum of Modern Art, and the Whitney Museum of American Art. In 1965 the Sterns moved across the United States and settled in Santa Monica, California, a relocation that would lead to their breakthroughs as artists. The couple shared a symbiotic artistic relationship and exhibited together throughout their careers.

== Career ==
Stern enjoyed early success in her watercolors, the techniques of which would heavily influence her later, more prolific acrylic works. During the 1970s she exhibited extensively on the east and west coasts, her work frequently drawing comparisons to that of contemporary Color Field artists Morris Louis and Helen Frankenthaler. On the relationship between Stern and Morris, one critic wrote:

"…the statements both artists make about the nature of paint differ. Louis' stains and pours often follow the force of gravity, so that paint appears to be drawn by its own pull towards the periphery of the canvas. Stern, on the other hand, makes acrylic seem weightless. It floats on white pristine canvas. It masses into rich areas with a spatial depth that Louis' works lack. It is forced onto the surface in many directions by an energy source beyond the paintings' edges."

Stern is identified with pure abstract forms of semi-translucent color on large, unprimed canvases. Commentators have recurrently suggested her subject matter is floral, despite no affirmation of such from the artist. In 1974 Stern partook in the "Childe Hassam Purchase Award Exhibition" at the American Academy of Arts and Letters, New York. Her first solo exhibition, Irene Monat Stern: Paintings, took place at The Downtown Gallery in Honolulu, Hawaii, in 1975. In 1981 the Hirschhorn Museum and Sculpture Garden acquired three of her large-scale paintings.

Stern's painting activity significantly declined in the 1980s as she became her husband's primary caregiver following his diagnosis of Parkinson's disease.

In 2011 Stern contributed a chapter to the volume How We Survived– 52 Personal Stories by Child Survivors of the Holocaust.

== Exhibitions ==
- Metropolitan Museum of Art Lecture Series, "Into the 60s – Modern Painting and Sculpture."
- Annual Invitational Group Exhibition, Esther-Robles Gallery, Los Angeles, August–September, 1973.
- Color '73, Brandt Library and Art Museum, Glendale, California, January 7–26, 1973.
- Childe Hassam Purchase Award Exhibition, American Academy of Arts and Letters, New York, 1974.
- Irene Monat Stern: Paintings, The Downtown Gallery, Honolulu, Hawaii, December 17, 1974 – January 3, 1975.
- Irene Monat Stern: Acrylic Paintings, Source Gallery, San Francisco, May 9-June 18, 1975.
- Jan Peter Stern and Irene Monat Stern, The 26th Street Gallery, Santa Monica, CA, February 1979.
- Additional Space Exposé IV, Los Angeles County Museum of Art (Art Rental Gallery), July 18- August 30, 1981.
- Irene Monat Stern and Jan Peter Stern, Park Avenue Atrium, New York, November-Spring, 1984.
- Irene Monat Stern, Hollis Taggart Galleries, New York, September 8-October 6, 2016.

== Sources ==
- Life Magazine, March 24, 1972, pg. 61–62.
- Wilson, William, "Seven Local Artists at Library Center," The Los Angeles Times, January 15, 1973, pg. 53.
- Raymond, Barry, "Joseph H. Lancor, AIA: Santa Fe Federal Savings & Loan, Del Mar Branch," Interiors, vol. 137, 1977, pg. 72.
- Dunham, Judith L., "Irene Monat Stern Paintings," Artweek, May 31, 1975.
