= Irene Condachi =

Maltese physician

- Born: 7 June 1899; Valletta, Malta
- Died: 3 September 1970 (aged 71); Pietà, Malta
- Occupation: physician
- Years active: 1928–1959

Irene Condachi (7 June 1899 – 3 September 1970) was a Maltese physician, one of only two female doctors practicing on the island during World War II. One of the founders of the school medical service, she became the medical officer for the government school and is credited with eradicating scabies in the education system.

== Early life ==
Irene Condachi was born in Malta on 7 June 1899. Her family were recent migrants to the island from Greece and her father, Constanino Condachi was a merchant. She was raised in the Greek Orthodox tradition, which had a more tolerant attitude to women working outside the home. In 1916, she began her medical studies at the University of Malta, but left after one year. A decade later, she graduated as a medical doctor from the University of Naples. Continuing her studies, Condachi received a specialist's degree in paediatrics in 1928 from the University of Pavia.

== Career ==
Returning to Malta after completing her studies, Condachi became an assistant to Joseph Ellul, the professor in charge of Midwifery and Gynaecology at the University of Malta in Valletta. In 1938, she was hired as the medical officer of the government school, and made her home on Luzio Street in Sliema. At the onset of war, with many men joining up to fight, women became more involved in the defense services for the island. Along with an ophthalmologist and a dentist, Condachi began the school medical service. Lacking transport, she walked or hitched rides to visit the various schools of the island to inoculate and perform medical examinations on over 20,000 school children between 1941 and 1942. She was responsible for eradicating scabies in the government schools using a petroleum-based ointment. The conditions of her work were dangerous, as in 1941, government schools were converted into hospitals and refugee centers. While overseeing the hospital in the government school at Qormi, the facility was bombed and Condachi, her staff, refugees and students narrowly escaped to an underground shelter beneath the girls' school. One of only two women doctors known to have practiced in Malta during the war, Condachi continued as the Ministry of Education's medical officer until 1959. She was the highest-paid woman in government service in her era.

== Death and legacy ==
Condachi died in 1970 and is remembered for her long career in providing medical service to Malta.

In 2014, Simon Cusens completed his master's degree, "the first academic work" on the topic of Maltese women's history during World War II. During his research, he discovered Condachi's story which was to be included in a 2016 book.

== Bibliography ==
- Borda, Alfred Conti (18 January 2015). "The Qormi school that was saved by the bell". The Times of Malta. Valletta, Malta. Archived from the original on 11 October 2018.
- Camilleri, Patricia (2006). "The Rise and Rise of the Female Graduate: Some milestones in tertiary education for women in Malta" (PDF). University of Malta. Tal-Qroqq, Msida, Malta: Alumni Relations Office. Archived from the original (PDF) on 11 October 2018.
- Carabott, Sarah (20 June 2016). "How women ran Malta during World War II". The Times of Malta. Valletta, Malta. Archived from the original on 23 June 2016.
- Cusens, Simon (2014). The role of women in World War II: The case of Malta (master's). Tal-Qroqq, Msida, Malta: University of Malta.
- Savona-Ventura, Charles; Borg-Galea, C. (2007). Universitas Studiorum Melitensis Medicinae Chirugiaeque Facultate: Roll of Honour (PDF). Tal-Qroqq, Malta: Faculty of Medicine & Surgery, University of Malta. ISBN 978-99932-0-536-4. Archived (PDF) from the original on 9 September 2017.
