= Irene Bertschek =

German economist

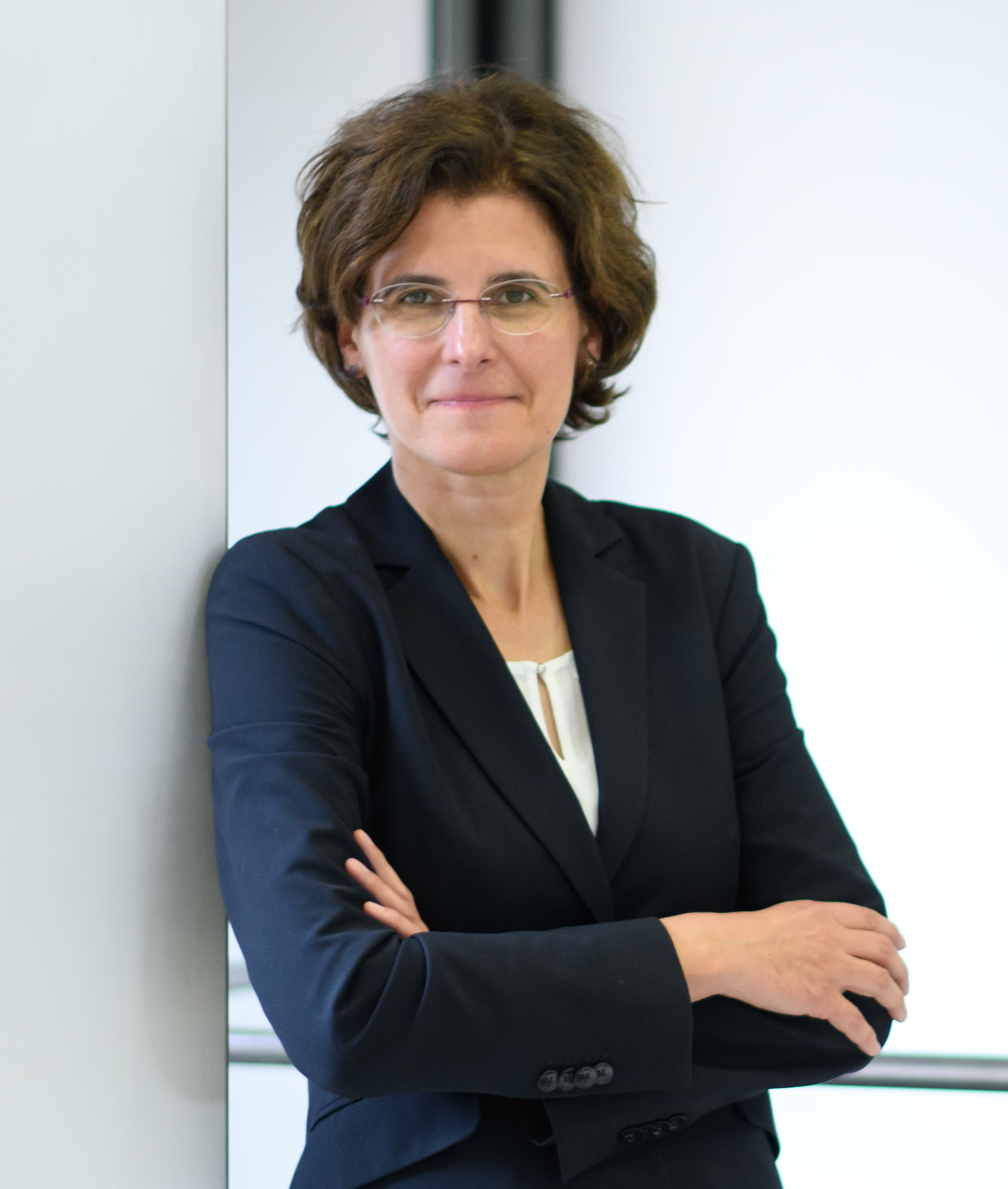
- Bertschek in 2020

Academic background
- Education: University of Mannheim; UCLouvain (MA, PhD)
- Thesis: Semiparametric analysis of innovative behavior (1996)

Academic work
- Discipline: Economist
- Sub-discipline: Digital transformation; Microeconometrics
- Institutions: Zentrum für Europäische Wirtschaftsforschung; University of Giessen

Irene Bertschek is a German economist and head of the Research Department Digital Economy at the ZEW – Leibniz Centre for European Economic Research in Mannheim.

She holds a professorship of economics of digitalisation at University of Giessen and is chairwoman of the Commission of Experts for Research and Innovation (EFI) since August 2025. She was a member of the Zukunftsrat des Bundeskanzlers, an advisory circle for the German Chancellor, from 2022 to 2025.

== Biography and career ==
Bertschek studied economics with a focus on industrial economics and econometrics at University of Mannheim (Diploma, 1992) and at Université catholique de Louvain in Louvain-la-Neuve, Belgium (M.A., 1991). Within the European Doctoral Program in Quantitative Economics, she held positions at the Centre de Recherche en Économie et Statistique (CREST-INSEE) in Paris, at the Humboldt University of Berlin and at the Institut de Statistique Université catholique de Louvain (UCLouvain). In 1996, she completed her doctoral thesis on "Semiparametric Analysis of Innovative Behaviour" at UCLouvain.

Since 1999, Irene Bertschek has been working at ZEW and is head of the research unit "Digital Economics" (formerly known as "Information and Communication Technologies") since 2001.

Bertschek was professor for Applied Empirical Economic Research at the University of Mannheim from 2011 to 2017. In 2017, she changed her professorship to be professor of Economics of Digitalisation at the University of Giessen.

In Mai 2019, Bertschek was appointed a member of the Expertenkommission Forschung und Innovation (EFI). Since August 2022, she served as Vice Chair, and in August 2025 she was elected Chairwoman of EFI. From 2022 to 2025, Bertschek was also member of the German Zunkuftsrat des Bundeskanzlers.

== Research ==
Bertschek researches industrial economic aspects of digitalisation with a special focus on the impact of digitalisation on firms’ innovation, productivity and work organization. Her methodological expertise lies in the field of microeconometrics and the analysis of firm-level data.

== Selected publications ==
- Bertschek, Irene; Polder, Michael; Schulte, Patrick (2019-11-17). "ICT and resilience in times of crisis: evidence from cross-country micro moments data". Economics of Innovation and New Technology. 28 (8): 759–774. doi:10.1080/10438599.2018.1557417. hdl:10419/167620. ISSN 1043-8599.
- Bertschek, Irene; Cerquera, Daniel; Klein, Gordon J. (September 2013). "More bits – more bucks? Measuring the impact of broadband internet on firm performance". Information Economics and Policy. 25 (3): 190–203. doi:10.1016/j.infoecopol.2012.11.002.
- Bertschek, Irene; Kaiser, Ulrich (March 2004). "Productivity Effects of Organizational Change: Microeconometric Evidence". Management Science. 50 (3): 394–404. doi:10.1287/mnsc.1030.0195. hdl:10419/24453. ISSN 0025-1909.
- Bertschek, Irene; Lechner, Michael (December 1998). "Convenient estimators for the panel probit model". Journal of Econometrics. 87 (2): 329–371. doi:10.1016/S0304-4076(98)00008-6.
- Bertschek, Irene (December 1995). "Product and Process Innovation as a Response to Increasing Imports and Foreign Direct Investment". The Journal of Industrial Economics. 43 (4): 341–357. doi:10.2307/2950548. JSTOR 2950548.
