= Irene Ovonji-Odida =

Ugandan lawyer, academic and politician

- Born: 1964 (age 61–62)
- Education: Bachelor of law and master's degree in comparative jurisprudence
- Occupation: Lawyer
- Known for: Women's rights campaigns, East African politics

Irene Ovonji-Odida (born 1964) is a Ugandan lawyer, politician, and women's rights activist. A member of the Uganda Law Reform Commission, she contributed to the writing of the 1995 Ugandan Constitution and helped to shape the East African Community. She has worked for various charities including ActionAid and carried out election monitoring in Uganda and Tanzania. She was an elected member of the East African Legislative Assembly from 2001 to 2006.

== Early life and education ==
Irene Ovonji was born in Uganda to Valerian Ovonji, who served as a permanent secretary for Public Service and Cabinet Affairs and government minister for Public Service under Idi Amin. Her mother Helen Ovonji was a trained teacher and also did tailoring. In 1972, however, her father was removed from his ministerial post for openly disagreeing with government policies, and in 1977 he fled to Kenya when he found out Amin's militia was targeting him to be killed. The following year his family joined him as refugees. Though they were able to return to Uganda in 1979 after Amin had been overthrown, Irene remained in Kenya for another five years to complete her secondary education. She stayed with relatives who had also sought refuge in Kenya.

Upon her return to Uganda, she enrolled at Makerere University, where she earned a Bachelor of Law. She later earned a master's degree in comparative jurisprudence from Howard University, Washington DC USA.

== Career ==
She has volunteered and served on the boards of various non-governmental organisations and INGOs since 1989, with a particular focus on those related to human rights and development. Ovonji-Odida has served as director of legal for the Ugandan government's Directorate of Ethics and Integrity. She became a member of the Uganda Law Reform Commission in 1994. She was also a legal officer in the Law Reform Commission and a researcher in the Constituent Assembly Commission, two of the organisations responsible for managing the writing of the 1995 constitution.

Ovonji-Odida participated in the 1997–98 campaign of East African women's movement led by Akina Mama wa Afrika to revise the draft East African Community (EAC) to widen its scope from a purely trade-based organisation to include international development responsibilities. She has worked for several national and international task forces including one for the EAC focussing on political federation. She is a member of the joint African Union-United Nations Economic Commission for Africa High Level Panel on Illicit Financial Flows chaired by H.E Thabo Mbeki, former president of South Africa (also known as Mbeki Panel on IFFs from Africa). She was also a member of the UN High Level Panel on Financial Accountability, Transparency and Integrity (UN FACTI Panel) from 2020-2021. capital.

Hon Ovonji-Odida campaigns for social justice, gender equality and human rights including the Black Monday anti-corruption campaign. She was elected as a member of the East African Legislative Assembly from 2001 to 2006, where she led programmes to improve transparency and accountability, to reduce regional conflicts, and to provide oversight for trade negotiations. She served as an election monitor for the 2005 Ugandan multi-party referendum and in the same year served on the committee of ActionAid Uganda. Ovonji-Odida sat on ActionAid's international board from 2007 and served two terms as the international board chair between 2009 and 2015. She served as a Commonwealth of Nations observer for several missions including the 2010 Tanzanian general election, 2015 Zambian national elections and 2018 Belize referendum.

Irene Ovonji-Odida is currently a Commissioner on the Independent Commission for Reform of Corporate Income Tax (ICRICT), and a member of the South Center Tax Steering Initiative, Tax Justice Network Africa Advisory Board and Pan African Lawyers Union task force on Illicit Financial Flows. She was vice-chairperson of the Council of Makerere University from 2013 to 2018., chair of the Center for Basic Research Trustees and Chief Executive of the Uganda Association of Women Lawyers in the same period. and served on a number of other boards, including The ONE Foundation African Policy Advisory Board. Irene Ovonji-Odida has done advocacy, trained and/ or carried out research into various issues including global tax justice and illicit financial flows, women's land rights, the Ugandan constitution and East African regional integration.

== Personal life ==
Ovonji-Odida is married and the mother of two.
