= Iréne Grahn =

Swedish visual artist and inventor

- Born: Iréne Maria Grahn; 7 February 1945; Västerbotten, Sweden
- Died: 19 September 2013 (aged 68); Tällberg, Sweden
- Education: Capellagården, Textile Institute
- Occupations: Inventor, artist
- Known for: Inventing a finger-joint support device

Iréne Maria Grahn (7 February 1945 in Västerbotten – 19 September 2013 in Tällberg), was a Swedish visual artist and medical device inventor.

== Biography ==
Iréne Grahn was born in Västerbotten and grew up in a group of six siblings. She trained as a visual artist having studied at Capellagården in Vickleby on Öland, the second largest Swedish island, and at the Textile Institute in Borås, Sweden.

As a professional artist, Grahn was inspired by nature and worked on many public space assignments for local and national government agencies using various materials ranging from tapestries to watercolors. When she became pregnant, however, she fell ill with rheumatoid arthritis, which can cause the patient's joints to become inflamed, growing swollen, sore and stiff. She was bedridden throughout her pregnancy. However, her arthritic condition did not improve even after she gave birth.

Although medication eased her discomfort, her finger joints began developing incorrectly, causing her fingers to grow in a crooked fashion. At first she tried plastic splints but found only limited success, and they were very unattractive as well. Inspired, she invented a finger-joint support that she called Fingerfärdig (Finger ready) that was both beautiful and functional. The device is worn like a pair of connected rings around an inflamed finger joint, forcing it to grow straight. She had prototypes made by a silversmith she knew personally from her art education and wore them on her fingers for many years.

Eventually, with the encouragement of doctors and patients alike, Grahn decided to patent her invention in 1992 and start the company IMG Mobility to make, market, sell and distribute the devices in many countries, including some outside the Nordic region. Her invention became registered as a medical device by a Swedish government agency.

Grahn died after a short illness on 19 September 2013 at 68. She was survived by her son Axel.

== Honors and awards ==
- Diploma: Light Year 1997 from the Royal Swedish Academy of Engineering Sciences saying her finger-joint support "combines function, form and beauty."
- Silver medal at the Eureka world exhibition of innovation in Brussels, 1998.
- Nominated for Female Inventor of the Year by the Swedish Inventors' Association, 2010.
