= Irene Gargantini =

Italian-Canadian computer scientist

Irene Antonia Gargantini (born 1934) is an Italian-Canadian retired computer scientist and numerical analyst, known for her research on root-finding algorithms^{[A]}^{[B]} and quadtrees and octrees,^{[C]}^{[D]} and in particular for introducing the use of hash tables in place of pointer-based structures for representing quadtrees and octrees. In her retirement as a professor emerita at the University of Western Ontario, she has also become a self-published novelist under the pseudonym René Natan.

== Early life and education ==
Gargantini was born in 1934 in Milan, the daughter of a railroad engineer. With the encouragement of her parents, she studied physics at the University of Milan, and after earning a doctorate there, she became a researcher at the university, where her work involved the calculation of electron trajectories in synchrotrons, using a computer from the Computer Research Corporation.

== Career and later life ==
She continued her work on computer-assisted physics calculations at the European Atomic Energy Community beginning in 1958, and at IBM Research in Switzerland beginning in 1965. There, her interests began shifting to the newly established field of numerical analysis.

After seeing an announcement in the Communications of the ACM for a new computer science program at the University of Western Ontario in Canada, headed by John Hart (whose research she had used at IBM), she took a faculty position in the program, beginning in 1968. She became department chair from 1986 to 1991, becoming the first female chair of a computer science department in Canada. She retired in 2000.

== Selected publications ==
Gargantini's research publications include:

A.	Gargantini, Irene; Henrici, Peter (August 1971), "Circular arithmetic and the determination of polynomial zeros", Numerische Mathematik, 18 (4): 305–320, doi:10.1007/BF01404681, MR 0303707, S2CID 121125347

B.	Gargantini, Irene (1978), "Further applications of circular arithmetic: Schroeder-like algorithms with error bounds for finding zeros of polynomials", SIAM Journal on Numerical Analysis, 15 (3): 497–510, Bibcode:1978SJNA...15..497G, doi:10.1137/0715032, MR 0501848

C.	Gargantini, Irene (1982), "An Effective Way to Represent Quadtrees", Communications of the ACM, 25 (12): 905–910, doi:10.1145/358728.358741, S2CID 14988647

D.	Gargantini, Irene (1982), "Linear octtres for fast processing of three-dimensional objects", Computer Graphics & Image Processing, 19 (1): 88–89, doi:10.1016/0146-664X(82)90140-X
