= Irene Agyepong =

Ghanaian Public Health Physician

Irene Akua Agyepong
- Education: University of North Carolina at Chapel Hill; Liverpool School of Tropical Medicine; University of Ghana Medical School; West African College of Physicians
- Scientific career
- Thesis: An implementation model for a district management system to achieve continuous quality improvement in malaria control as part of primary health care in Ghana (2000)

Irene Akua Agyepong is a Ghanaian public health physician with the Dodowa Health Research Center and member of the Faculty of Public Health of the Ghana College of Physicians and Surgeons. Agyepong led The Lancet commission on the future of healthcare in sub-Saharan Africa.

== Early life and education ==
As a child, Ageypong wanted to write, sew and become a doctor. She eventually studied medicine at the University of Ghana Medical School. She moved to the West African College of Physicians, where she was encouraged by her aunt, Phyllis Antwi, to specialise in public health. After graduating Agyepong worked as a medical locum at a mission hospital. One of her first positions was working in obstetrics; which she found emotionally challenging. In an interview with The Lancet Agyepong explained, "This was Ghana in the 1980s—we were still emerging from a really difficult economic time. Sometimes there were no gloves, there weren't the right needles, sometimes you couldn't find simple things like a scalpel…And there was no blood bank…You could have somebody die before enough blood became available. You would know what to do—but couldn't". She was encouraged by then Director of Medical Services Moses Adibo to work internationally, and moved to the United Kingdom to study public health at the Liverpool School of Tropical Medicine. Agyepong eventually moved to the United States, where she completed a doctoral degree studying malaria control in Ghana.

== Research and career ==
After earning her doctorate, Ageypong returned to Ghana. She was eventually made Director of Health for the Greater Accra region. She held a joint position at the University of Ghana School of Public Health.

== Select publications ==
- Peters, David H.; Adam, Taghreed; Alonge, Olakunle; Agyepong, Irene Akua; Tran, Nhan (2014-04-01). "Republished research: Implementation research: what it is and how to do it: Implementation research is a growing but not well understood field of health research that can contribute to more effective public health and clinical policies and programmes. This article provides a broad definition of implementation research and outlines key principles for how to do it". British Journal of Sports Medicine. 48 (8): 731–736. doi:10.1136/bmj.f6753. ISSN 0306-3674. PMID 24659611. S2CID 52862104.
- Agyepong, Irene Akua; Adjei, Sam (2008-03-01). "Public social policy development and implementation: a case study of the Ghana National Health Insurance scheme". Health Policy and Planning. 23 (2): 150–160. doi:10.1093/heapol/czn002. ISSN 0268-1080. PMID 18245803.
- Gilson, Lucy; Hanson, Kara; Sheikh, Kabir; Agyepong, Irene Akua; Ssengooba, Freddie; Bennett, Sara (2011-08-23). "Building the Field of Health Policy and Systems Research: Social Science Matters". PLOS Medicine. 8 (8) e1001079. doi:10.1371/journal.pmed.1001079. ISSN 1549-1676. PMC 3160340. PMID 21886488.
