= Pachanga Latino Music Festival =

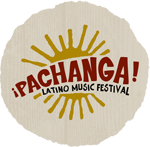
Pachanga Latino Music Festival logo

Pachanga Presents is the first Latin-themed music, cultural arts and food festival originated in Austin, Texas, United States. It is a one-day festival that showcases Latino-created music, food, and works of art and their contributions to American culture.

The inaugural Pachanga Festival was held on May 9, 2008 at Waterloo Park in Austin, Texas and attracted an estimated 2,000 visitors. It featured 20 musicians in genres ranging from rock and alternative to tejano, cumbia, folklorico, and reggaeton. It also showcased arts and crafts from Latino artists as well as social and political activist areas.

== Activities ==
Pachanga provides an interactive area for children that features hands-on cultural activities for them to participate in. Dance lessons, in Latin-based styles like Salsa, are available. Music workshops and artist appearances are available to reach out to Austin's network of musicians, bands and other individuals involved in the music scene.

=== References ===
- Official website
- News 8 Austin news coverage
- KVUE News Story
- Austin Chronicle News
