= Irene Aragón Castillo =

Mexican politician

- Born: 30 December 1963 (age 62); Chihuahua, Mexico
- Occupation: Politician
- Political party: PRD

Irene Aragón Castillo (born 30 December 1963) is a Mexican politician from the Party of the Democratic Revolution. From 2006 to 2009 she served as Deputy of the LX Legislature of the Mexican Congress representing Veracruz.
