= Irene Foote =

Irene Foote may refer to:

- Irene Castle (1893–1969), née Foote, American ballroom dancer and dance teacher
- Irene Foote (bowls), New Zealand lawn bowls player
