= Irene Moroz =

British applied mathematician

Irene Margaret Moroz is a British applied mathematician whose research interests include differential equations including the Schrödinger–Newton equation, attractors, synchronization of chaos, and applications to geophysical fluid dynamics, voice analysis, the population dynamics of plankton, and dynamo theory. She is Professor of Mathematics and Applied Mathematics in the Mathematical Institute, University of Oxford and Senior Mathematics Fellow at St Hilda's College, Oxford.

Moroz was educated at the University of Leeds, and was formerly affiliated with the University of East Anglia before becoming Applied Mathematics Fellow at St. Hilda's in 1992. At the Mathematical Institute, she is group lead for the Mathematical Geoscience Group.

Her work in dynamo theory, with collaborators including Raymond Hide and Andrew Soward, involved the derivation of simple systems of coupled differential equations for dynamos such as the Earth's magnetic field, that can model phenomena involving intermittent collapses of these fields.
