= Irene O. Galloway =

American Army soldier

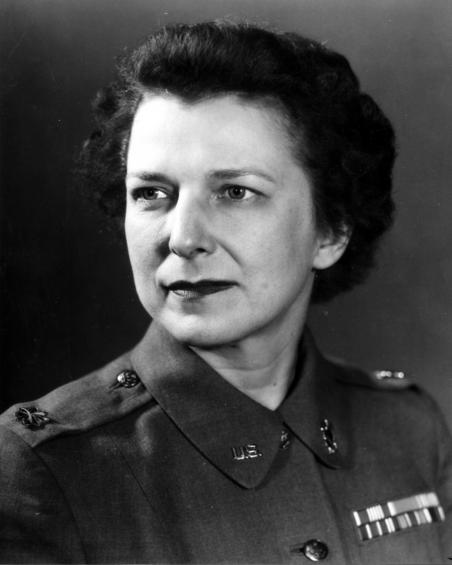
- Colonel Irene O. Galloway
- Born: 1908
- Died: 1963 (aged 54–55)
- Military career
- Allegiance: United States
- Branch: United States Army
- Rank: Colonel
- Commands: Women's Army Corps
- Conflicts: World War II
- Awards: Army Commendation Medal

Irene O. Galloway (1908–1963) was an American Army soldier and the fourth director of the Women's Army Corps (WAC).

== Early life and war service ==
Irene O. Galloway of Carroll County, Iowa attended Boyles Business College in Omaha, Nebraska. Galloway joined the Women’s Army Auxiliary Corps in June 1942. In September 1942 Galloway was graduated from WAAC Officer Candidate School at the WAAC Training Center at Fort Des Moines, Iowa. When asked why she was compelled to join the Army, Galloway replied that she was inspired to join because of her brother who was serving in the Pacific during World War II and because of an article in the New York Times regarding opportunities for women in the Army.

Galloway served in the WAAC through World War II and witnessed many changes in the roles women played in the military throughout the Cold War, one of which was the loss of women's status as "auxiliary" units that changed the name of the WAAC to WAC. Upon completing her training, Galloway served at the WAC headquarters at the Pentagon, the headquarters for the Army Services Forces, and with the G-1 Career Management Group until she was assigned as WAAC Staff Advisor for the U.S. Army in Europe in 1948. In November 1952 Galloway was selected as a replacement for commander of the WAC Training Center in Fort Lee.

Just two weeks after reporting for duty as Commander of the WAC Training Center, Galloway was notified of her selection as Director of the WAC and was sworn in on January 3, 1953. At the time of her appointment as director, Colonel Galloway had served 10 years in the WAC, and was awarded the Commendation Ribbon from the Army of Occupation WAAC, and the American Theater and European Theater Ribbons during World War II. During her tenure as WAC Director, Colonel Galloway played an instrumental role in increasing military pay and reenlistment bonuses. Colonel Galloway also implemented the Military Occupational Services (MOS) for enlisted personnel, and oversaw the establishment of a new WAC training facility in Fort McClellan in Alabama.

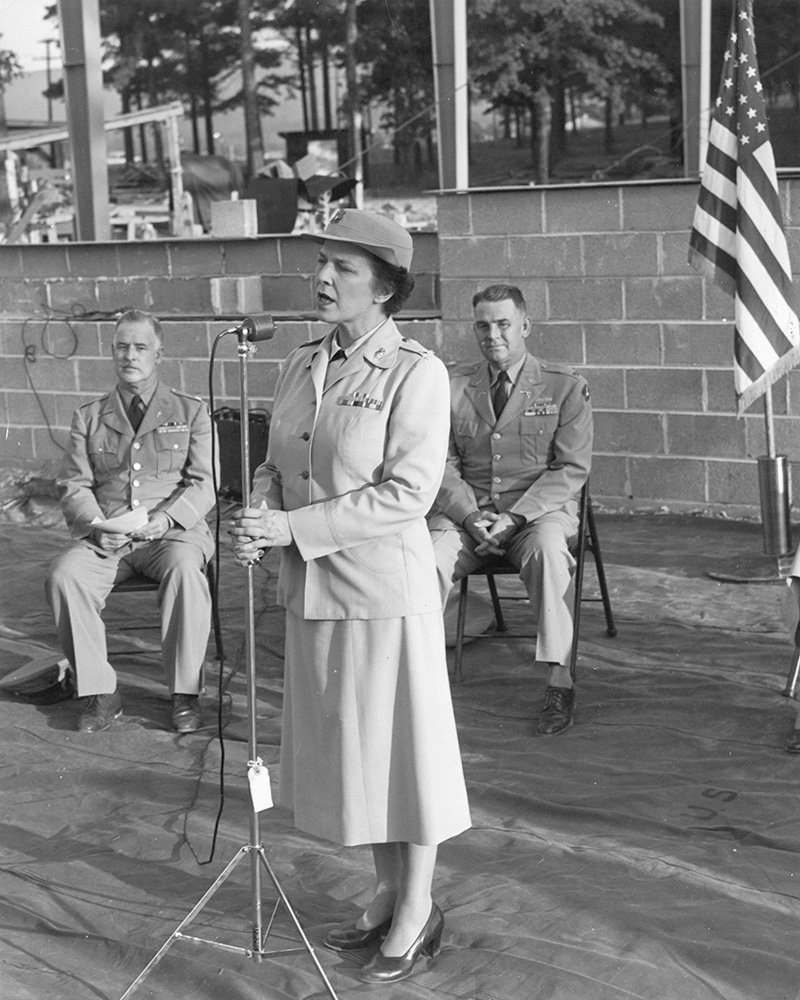
Col. Irene O. Galloway, Director, WAC, at Fort McClellan

In 1963 Colonel Irene O. Galloway died of cancer. As a result of her role in moving the WAC training facility to Alabama, the North Gate entrance and North Gate Road, both of which led through the WAC Training Facility at Fort McClellan, were renamed Galloway Gate and Galloway Gate Road.
