= Irene Neverla =

Austrian professor

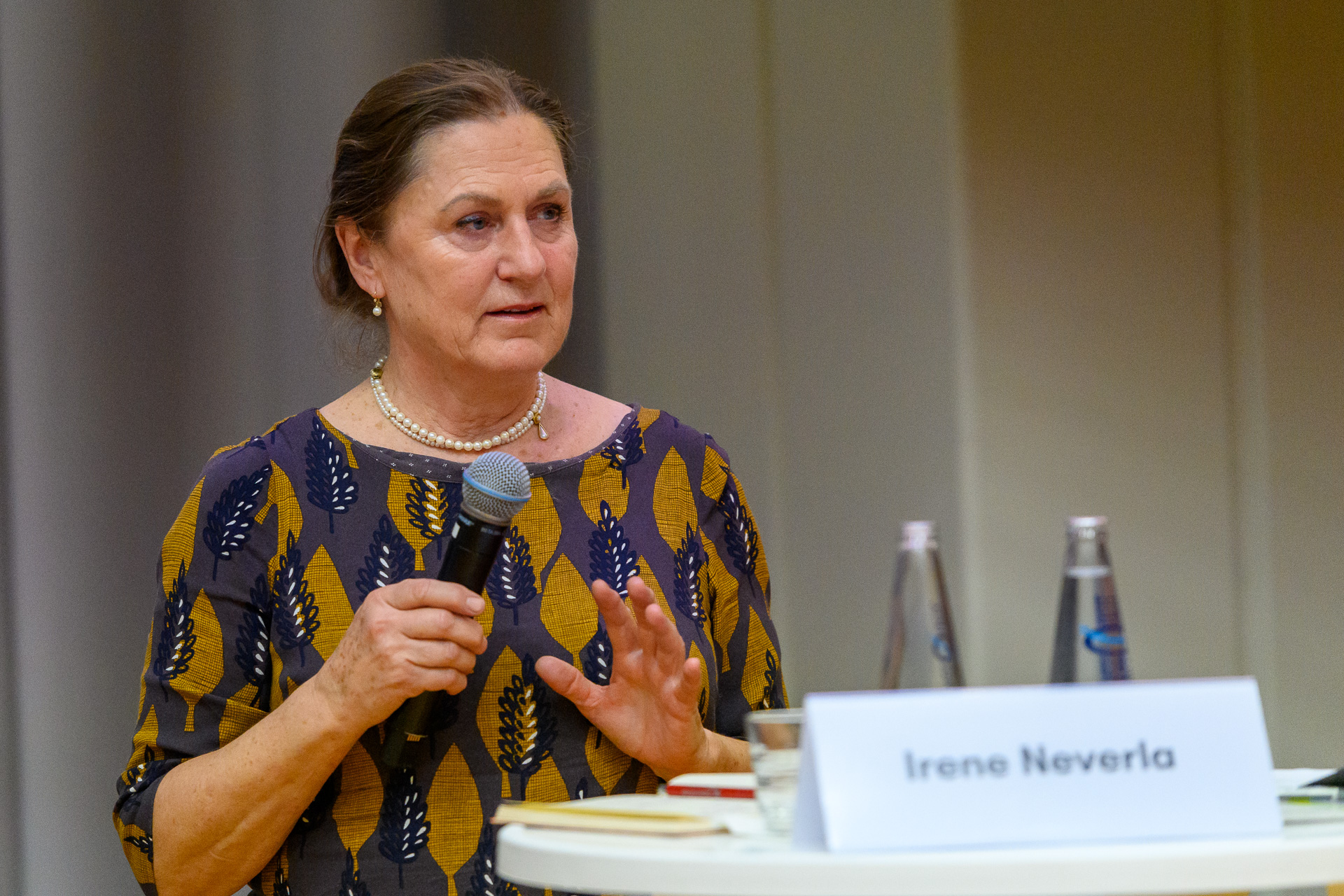
- in Berlin in 2022
- Born: 11 February 1952 (age 74); Graz
- Education: University of Vienna; University of Salzburg; LMU Munich
- Occupation: academic
- Employer: Free University of Berlin
- Known for: climate communication
- Children: one

Irene Neverla (born 11 February 1952) is an Austrian professor of communication. Neverla chairs the Austrian state broadcaster's advisory board.

== Life ==
Neverla was born in Graz in 1952. She first studied journalism at the Vienna International Press Centre, before she studied communication science, sociology and psychology at the University of Vienna and the University of Salzburg.

She gained her doctorate at LMU Munich.

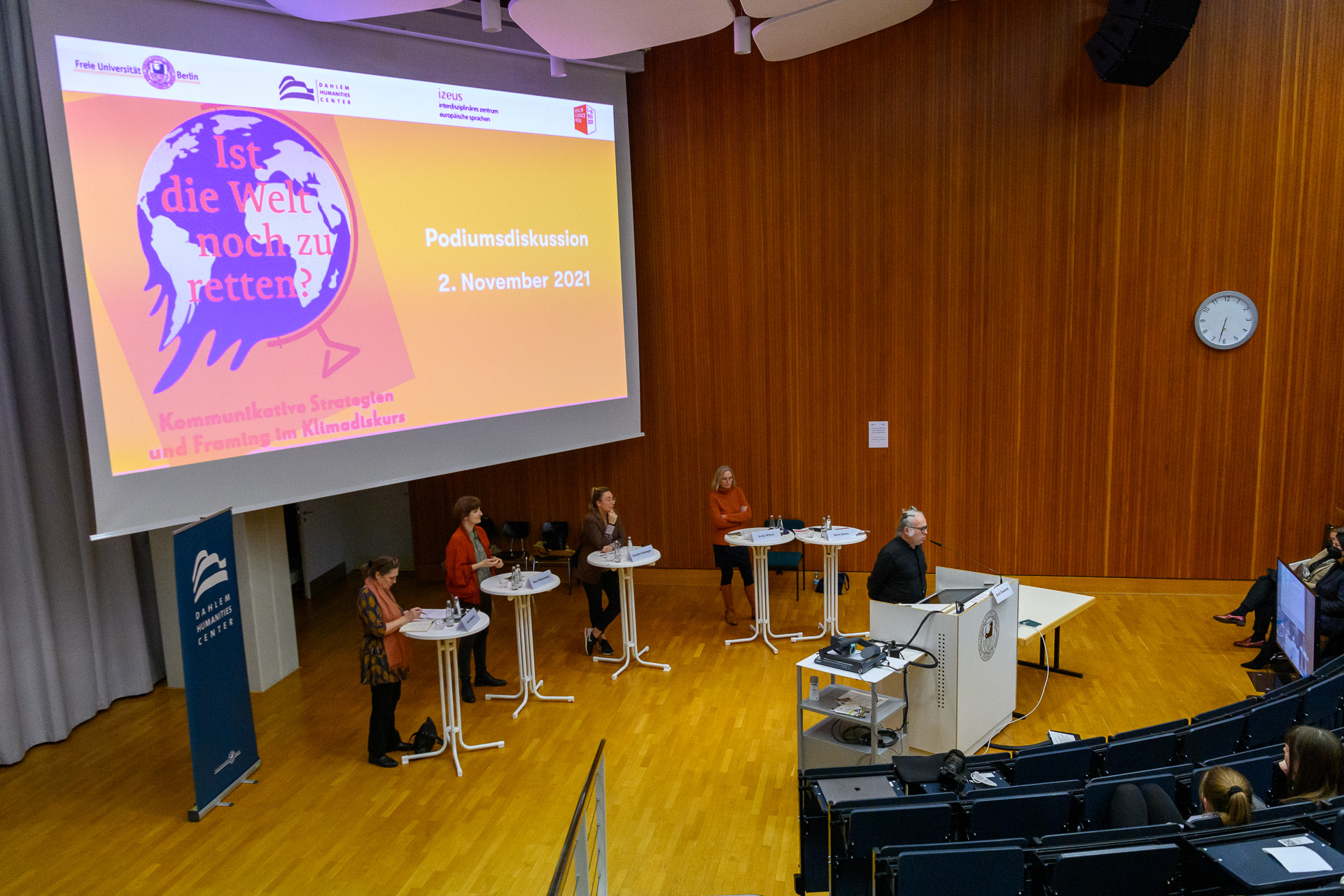
Panel discussion "Can the world still be saved?" on climate communication at the Freie Universität Berlin, November 2nd, 2022 left to right:

In 1992, she became a professor at the Faculty of Economics and Social Sciences at the University of Hamburg, specializing in journalism and communication sciences.

In 1980, she published her study Female journalists: women in a male profession noting that women were in the minority and there was a natural expectation that men would take the lead in discussions.

Her research focuses on journalism and reception research, visual communication, environmental, scientific and climate communication with a focus on climate change.

After her retirement in September 2017, she accepted an honorary professorship in the Department of Political and Social Sciences at Freie Universität Berlin in 2018 and began teaching at the Institute for Journalism and Communication Sciences.

In 2022, she took part in a panel discussion at the Free University of Berlin asking "Can the world still be saved?" with Antje Wilton, the journalist Sara Schurmann, Simon Horst and Carolin Schwegler. In the same year, she spoke out against the plans of Roland Weissman of the Austrian state broadcaster to halve the amount of text they have online to replace it with video. Neverla chairs the broadcaster's advisory board and said this was a mistake as although video was useful it was text that was the core of good jounrnalism and communication.

== Selected works ==
- Environmental Journalism, 2014 (editor with Henrik Bødker)
- Media, Communication and the Struggle for Democratic Change: Case Studies on Contested Transitions
