= Irene Sue Vernon =

American educator

- Born: Little Rock, Arkansas, U.S.
- Education: University of California, Berkeley; University of New Mexico
- Occupations: Professor; author; researcher
- Employer: Colorado State University
- Title: Chair of Ethnic Studies

Irene Sue Vernon is a professor of Ethnic Studies Department at Colorado State University. She specialises in the field of Native Americans and HIV/AIDS.

== Early life and education ==
Vernon was born in Little Rock, Arkansas and grew up in Santa Barbara, California. She earned a Bachelor of Arts in Native American studies from University of California, Berkeley, a Master of Arts in History from University of New Mexico, and a doctorate in Ethnic Studies from University of California, Berkeley.

== Work and career ==
Vernon is currently a full time professor at Colorado State University where she is the Chair of Ethnic Studies Department and also the Assistant to the Dean of the College of Liberal Arts. Along with her career as a professor, Vernon also has a career as an author as well as a researcher for Native Americans and HIV/AIDS. She is the author of Killing Us Quietly: Native Americans and HIV/AIDS (2001). and the co-author of Social Life and Issues (2005).

== Political involvement ==
Vernon has occasionally been sought for comment during high-profile news stories relating to race and ethnicity in the Northern Colorado area.

=== 2013 pro-gun billboard controversy ===
In April 2013, two billboards depicting three men in traditional Native American attire armed with rifles and was captioned "Turn in your arms, the government will take care of you" were erected in Greeley, Colorado by an anonymous, pro-gun advocacy group. Opposition ensued with some area residents as they claimed the advertisement was offensive to Native Americans, prompting coverage by the Associated Press regarding the incident.

Included with the Associated Press' initial article, Vernon was paraphrased as saying "the billboard message is taking a narrow view of a much more complicated history of the American Indians' plight," and continued stating that Native Americans "[did not just give] up their guns and [wind] up on reservations."

The backlash surrounding the incident reached nationwide coverage, including a discussion on the FOX News show The Five.

=== Illegal Pete's naming controversy ===
In October 2014, public debate ignited when the Colorado-based, "Mexican-style" food chain Illegal Pete's announced plans to open a Fort Collins restaurant. Outspoken residents began protesting the name of the restaurant, citing that the word "illegal" held a negative connotation and should be changed. Restaurant owner Pete Turner, however, maintained that the name was drawn from the name of a bar in a book he read as a college student in Boulder, Colorado, and not as a reference to immigration. Vernon spoke out against the name, stating in Colorado State University's student-run paper, The Collegian, that "historically the word [illegal] was used to incriminate immigrants". Noting Pete Turner was a "very kind and generous man", she said she was nonetheless "surprised [owner Pete Turner] couldn't connect the issue with the word 'illegal' and 'immigrant.'" Turner declined to change the name, releasing a letter on the company's website and opening the store in the following November.

== Publications ==
=== Books ===
- Killing Us Quietly: Native Americans and HIV/AIDS (2001)
- Social Life and Issues: Contemporary Native American Issues (co-author) (2005)

=== Journal articles ===
- "Native American Women and HIV/AIDS: Building Healthier Communities" American Indian Quarterly 33: 352–372. (co-author) (2009)
- "Rap about the Clap: A Qualitative Study of American Indian Youth and STDs/STIs" American Indian Culture and Research Journal 39(2): 53–67. (co-author) (2015)
- "Communication about sexually transmitted infections among rural and urban Native American youth in the United States," Howard Journal of Communication 26: 172–192. (co-author) (2015)
- "Closing the Gap: a research agenda for the study of health needs among American Indian/Native Hawaiian transgender individuals," Ethnic Studies Review Journal 36(1-2): 37–58. (co-author) (2013)
- " 'We Were Those Who Walked out of Bullets and Hunger:' Representation of Trauma and Healing in Solar Storms," American Indian Quarterly 36 (Winter): 34–49. (2012)
- "American Indian Women, HIV/AIDS and Health Disparities," Substance Use & Misuse: An International Interdisciplinary Forum 42: 741–752. (2007)
- "Advancing HIV/AIDS Prevention among American Indians through Capacity Building and Community Readiness Model". Journal of Public Health Management and Practice (January): S49-S54. (co-author) (2007)
- "The Changing Face of HIV/AIDS Among Native Populations." Journal of Psychoactive Drugs 37 (September): 247–255. (co-author) (2005)
- " 'A happiness that sleeps with sadness': An Examination of White Scabs in Fools Crow." American Indian Quarterly 29 (Winter/Spring): 178–197. (2005)
- "Prevention of HIV/AIDS in Native Americans Communities: Promising Interventions," Public Health Reports 117: S96-S103. (co-author) (2002)

== Awards and nominations ==
=== Awards ===
- 2016: Oliver P. Pennock Distinguished Service Award, Colorado State University
- 2016: National Association of Ethnic Studies Award
- 2015: Margaret B. Hazaleus Award, Colorado State University
- 2013: National Association for Ethnic Studies Charles C. Irby Distinguished Service Award
- 2011: 1st Generation Scholarship Awards Committee Recognition, Colorado State University
- 2008: Public Health Award, Colorado School of Public Health, Colorado State University
- 1994: UC Berkeley Graduate Fellowship
- 1993: Frances C. Allen Fellowship for the promotion of higher education and promotion of academic study for Native women
- 1991-1993: UC Berkeley Graduate Minority Award
- 1991: New Mexico Student Research Allocation Award
- 1989-1991: New Mexico State Fellowship
- 1983: UC Berkeley Academic Achievement Award
- 1981-1982: Laverne Alexander Platt Scholarship for excellent achievements

=== Nominations ===
- 2007: Distinguished Alumni Awards-Distinguished Faculty
- 2005: Margaret Hazelous Award
- 2004: Colorado State University Eddy Teacher Award
