= Irene Zundel =

Mexican sculptor, painter, and photographer

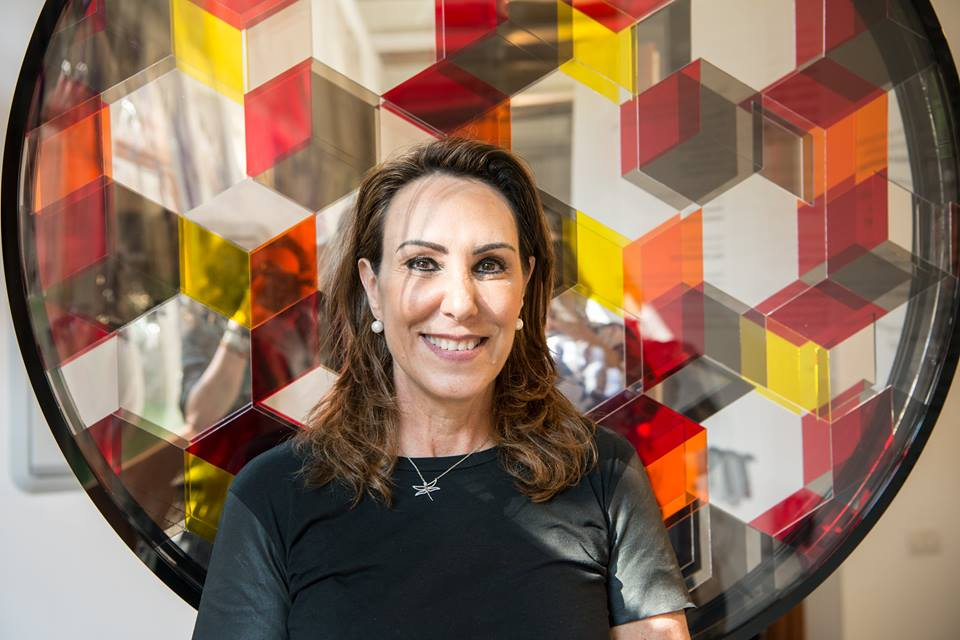
Irene Zundel in 2018.

Irene Zundel (born 1958), is a Mexican sculptor, painter and photographer. Her sculpture is made of different materials and has been shown around the world. Zundel lives and works in Mexico City.

== Biography ==
Zundel was born in Mexico City in 1958. Zundel was influenced at an early age by the works of M.C. Escher. Between 1977 and 1981 she attended the Philadelphia College of Art where she studied graphic design. After coming back to Mexico, Zundel was influenced to become a fine artist after an experience with multi-sensory therapy. Eventually, she moved on to working with sculpture, using acrylic to create her art. Throughout her career she has moved on to working with other materials, such as wax, pottery, iron and recently Plexiglass.

Zundel has received the Italian award, Premio Italia per L'arte and exhibited at the Franz Mayer Museum.

== Individual exhibits ==
- 2017–2018: Berlin Germany (Jenseits Des Sichtbaren. Madrid, Spain (Más allá de lo Aparente/Beyond the Apparent)
- 2014: Mexico City (INFLICTO) at the Franz Mayer Museum.
- 1996–1999: Mexico City in the following galleries... Galería de Arte Misrachi, Galería HB Mexico City, Casa de Cultura Jesús Reyes Heroles, Galería S.Menache, Casa de Cultura Tlalpan, Galería Pedro Gerson

== Collective exhibits ==
- 1993–2018: Irene has participated in multiple collective exhibits in the following cities: Mexico City (Museum of Modern Art in Mexico City), Zona MACO, S Menache Gallery, Pedro Gerson Gallery, Subasta Grupo de los Dieciseis AC, ); Miami (Durban Segnini Gallery), Sevilla Spain (Traveling exhibit), Cadiz Spain (Traveling exhibit), Huelva Spain (Traveling exhibit), Florence Italy (Palazzo degli Affari), Brindisi Italy, Ontario Canada (Art Gallery of Windsor).

== Artwork and exhibitions ==
=== INFLICTO ===
A series of 15 sculptures and photographs, all constructed by Irene Zundel. The artist's intent here is to move the observer's attention from a museum configuration and interactive video.

=== Mas Allá de lo Aparente ===
A series of 12 sculptures including wood over acrylic, canvas and Plexiglass. Here the artist plays with light and its projections. Irene pays special attention to making pieces that change as the observer walks around them, playing with what is real and unreal. Colors, figures and patterns emerge from her plexiglass artwork constituting a play of perspectives,. Here Irene pays special attention to the observer's position and immersion. This exhibit traveled from Venice and Berlin.

When this exhibit traveled to Berlin, it formed part of the inauguration of the Mexican Cultural Institute in Germany.

This exhibit traveled to Ankara, Turkey and was exhibited July thru August 2018 at CerModern Art Museum.
