= Irene van Renswoude =

Dutch historian

Irene van Renswoude (born 1967) is professor by special appointment of Manuscripts and Cultural History, with a focus on the Middle Ages (500–1500), at the University of Amsterdam’s (UvA) Faculty of Humanities.

She holds the Herman de la Fontaine Verwey Chair, a position established on behalf of the National Library of the Netherlands.
