= Irene Griegst =

Moroccan-born Danish goldsmith (born 1945)

- Born: 15 June 1945 (age 80); Casablanca
- Occupations: Goldsmith and jewellery designer

Irene Griegst (born 1945) is a Moroccan-born Danish goldsmith and jewellery designer. While studying in Jerusalem in the 1960s, she met the Danish jeweller Arje Griegst (1938–2016); they married in 1967. Working together with her husband, she has designed diadems, necklaces and earrings incorporating gemstones, pearls and gold. Her work has been widely exhibited in Denmark and abroad.

== Biography ==
Born in Casablanca on 15 June 1945, from an early age Irene embroidered clothes for Moroccan women. After graduating in English and French literature at the Hebrew University of Jerusalem, she went on to study at the Bezalel Academy of Arts and Design, specializing in enameling. While in Jerusalem, she met and married the Danish goldsmith and designer Arje Griegst (1938-2016) who was a teacher at the Bezalel Academy. They had two children together, Noam and Lia.

After receiving further training from her husband, from 1978 Irene became an active participant in the company he had set up in Copenhagen the 1960s. In addition to creating artefacts, she also taught jewellery design for three years in the late 1970s. Her creations in both textiles and jewellery exhibit her familiarity with the traditions of the Orient. Her jewellery consists both of items in gold alone or in gold combined with gemstones, pearls, enamel or coral, frequently displaying flowers, leaves and insects. She looks back at her days as an embroiderer in Casablanca, commenting: "I sew my jewellery with gold thread." Her works extend from necklaces and bracelets to diadems which may appear old-fashioned but have become popular with Scandinavians as they provide flowers to decorate their hair.

Griegst's work is exhibited widely in Denmark and abroad, in particular at the Danish Design Museum, the Danish Arts Foundation and the Röhsska Museum of Design and Craft in Gothenburg, Sweden.
