= Irene Richards =

New Zealand painter

Irene Richards (née O'Neill, born 1939) is a New Zealand painter from Hokitika. Two of her works are in the permanent collection of Auckland Art Gallery Toi o Tāmaki.

== Biography ==
Richards completed a diploma in fine arts in painting from the University of Canterbury in 1963. Her works involve nature and her Christian faith.
