= Irene Cabrera Lorenzo =

Spanish former volleyball player

Irene Cabrera Lorenzo (December 20, 1982, Santa Cruz de Tenerife, Spain) is a Spanish former volleyball player and graphic designer. She has one of the best track records in Spanish women's volleyball.

She is the daughter of Zoraida Lorenzo Quintana and Quico Cabrera, president of Club Volleyball Tenerife. Since she was a child, she had a passion for sports at home and tried different disciplines, opting for volleyball, to which she dedicated 30 years of her career in the lower categories and later as a professional. Her position on the court was that of setter. She studied graphic design at BAU Centro Universitario de Diseño.

In her professional career as a player she played for different teams: Club Volleyball Tenerife (the only Spanish team to win a European Final Four in 2004), FC Barcelona, Club Volleyball Sant Cugat, Club Volleyball Viladecans, among others. In those teams she coincided with players like Maurizia Cacciatori, Magaly Carvajal, Elena Godina or Marina Dubinina. In addition to having played in different national beach volleyball tournaments.
