= Irene González =

Irene González may refer to:

- Irene González (footballer) (1909–1928), Spanish footballer
- Irene González (water polo) (born 1996), Spanish water polo player
- Irene González Hernández (1969–2014), Spanish researcher and physicist
