= Iren =

Iren or Irén may refer to:

== People ==
- Irén Ágay (1913–1950), Hungarian actress
- Irén Barbér (1939–2006), Slovene author and journalist
- Irén Daruházi-Karcsics (1927–2011), Hungarian gymnast
- Irén Júlia Götz (1889–1940) was a Hungarian chemist and university lecturer, first woman to teach at a Hungarian university
- Irén Hönsch (1932–2021), Hungarian chess player
- Irén Lovász, Hungarian folk singer and ethnographer
- Irén Marik (1905–1986), Hungarian-born classical pianist
- Iren Nigg (born 1955), Liechtensteiner writer
- Iren Opdahl (born 1974), Norwegian politician
- Irén Pavlics (born 1934), Hungarian Slovene author and editor
- Irén Psota (1929–2016), Hungarian actress
- Iren Reppen (born 1965), Norwegian actress
- Irén Rostás, Hungarian orienteering competitor in the 1970s and '80s
- Emmanuel Iren (born 1989), Nigerian preacher, gospel singer and songwriter

== Other uses ==
- IREN Ltd., Australian company
- Iren, Italian company
- Iren (river), Perm Krai, Russia
- Inter Region Economic Network, a non-governmental organization based in Nairobi, Kenya

== See also ==
- Yren Rotela (born 1981), Paraguayan activist for the rights of LGBT people and sex workers
- Nigel Irens, British yacht designer
