= Irene Rousseau =

American artist

Irene Rousseau (born 1941 Summit, New Jersey) is an American artist. Her work is included in the collections of the Whitney Museum of American Art, The Phillips Collection, the Smithsonian Museum of American Art and the Museum of Modern Art, New York. She a member and President Emeritus of American Abstract Artists.
