= Irene Lim Seow Goh =

Fashion designer

- Born: Irene Lim Seow Goh; 1944 (age 81–82)
- Education: Royal Melbourne Institute of Technology
- Occupation: fashion designer
- Father: Charlie Lim

Irene Lim Seow Goh (born 1944) was the first chairman of the Fashion Arts Trade Advisory Committee of the Industrial Training Board and a prominent fashion designer in Singapore.

== Early life and education ==
Lim's father was prominent restaurateur Charlie Lim. She initially studied interior design at the Royal Melbourne Institute of Technology. However, two years after she had begun attending the university, she switched to a course in fashion as she was afraid that she would not be able to find many opportunities as an interior designer in Singapore. In 1966, she won the university's Most Promising Student Award.

== Career ==
After graduating from the institute, Lim returned to Singapore in January 1967 and began working for a dress house. Her dresses were first showcased at a fashion show held at the Raffles Hotel on 25 March. By June 1971, she had established the mini-boutique "Irene-n-Me" at the Bata Premier Store and the boutique "Irene" at the Singapore Hilton. She became a fashion coordinator at Isetan in 1973. A collection of 80 of her dresses were showcased at a fashion show in the Philippines in April 1974. In June, she closed down her boutique and began working as a marketing manager for an Australian men's wear chain. By November 1975, her clothes had been showcased in Manila multiple times and once in Hong Kong.

In 1978, Lim was appointed the chairman of the newly established Fashion Arts Trade Advisory Committee of the Industrial Training Board. This made her the only female head of an Industrial Training Board trade advisory committee.
