= Irene Hoffar Reid =

Canadian painter

- Born: Irene Hoffar; 1908; Vancouver, British Columbia, Canada
- Died: July 1994 (aged 85–86); Sidney, British Columbia, Canada
- Known for: Painter
- Spouse: Neville Reid (1933–1965)

Lillian Irene Hoffar Reid (1908 – 1994) was a Canadian painter. She was in the first graduating class, June 1929, at the Vancouver School of Decorative and Applied Art (now the Emily Carr University of Art and Design). She taught at the Vancouver School of Art from 1933 to 1937.

== Biography ==
Reid was born in Vancouver, British Columbia in 1908. She left King George High School early to attend the newly opened Vancouver School of Decorative and Applied Arts (VSDAA). There she was trained by Frederick Varley, Charles H. Scott and Jock Macdonald, and learned about the Group of Seven. Reid is quoted saying: "In 1928, at the Pacific National Exhibition, I viewed paintings by the Group of Seven. I saw a large painting of a mountain by Lawren Harris and I felt that I had never seen a mountain before. I was influenced by the Group and began to paint larger and more boldly designed canvases".

In 1929, she and 11 of her classmates were the VSDAA's first graduating class. Following her graduation, she helped form PASOVAS, Pioneer Art Students of the Vancouver Art School, which put on annual exhibits.

In 1933, she married Nevile Reid and later had two children, Linda (1942) and Catherine (1946).

Artist B.C. Binning was also a teacher at VSDAA, and designed a studio at Reid's house in West Vancouver, which was built between 1935 and 1936 in West Vancouver.

Reid worked in oils until the lead in the paint started to cause health problems, and later focused on pastels and watercolours. The subject matter of her paintings shifted as she had children and domestic life took up more of her time. Her works became smaller, and she would sketch what was around her instead of taking sketching trips to places like North Vancouver Indian Reservation, Burrard Street Bridge squatters' huts or the shoreline around Vancouver. She was the president of the B.C. Society of Artists in the 1960s.

Reid and her graduating class were all awarded honorary diplomas in 1989 from the Emily Carr College of Art and Design.

Like many Canadian women in her generation, Reid's work is often overlooked, although she was a significant member of the Vancouver art community.

== Teaching ==
Reid returned to the Vancouver School of Art to teach painting between 1933 and 1938.

== Awards ==
- 1929: Graduation Fellowship Award, VSDAA
- 1931: Postgraduate scholarship, Royal Academy of Painting in London, England
- 1940: Beatrice Stone Medal for her drawing The Valley at BC Artists Annual Exhibition at Vancouver Art Gallery
- 1967: Centennial Medal for Service to the Nation in Arts

== Exhibitions ==
1929: Vancouver Art Gallery with the B.C. Society of Artists (1940–43, 1945, 1948–49, 1950–59, 1960–64, 1966–67)

1930: Pasovas Art Club Exhibition, British Columbia Art League—mural Sun Bathers

1931: Annual Exhibition of Canadian Art, National Gallery, Ottawa—Mural Decoration

1932: Pasovas Art Club Exhibition, Vancouver Art Gallery

1933: Vancouver Art Gallery B.C. Artists Annual (1933, 1934, 1937, 1938, 1940–41, 1951, 1954–57)

Annual Exhibition of Canadian Art, National Gallery, Ottawa -- paintings

1934: Twentieth Annual Exhibition of Northwest Artists, Seattle Art Museum, Volunteer Park

1957: The Winnipeg Exhibition at the Winnipeg Art Gallery

1958: 100 Years of B.C. Art at the Vancouver Art Gallery

1961: Canadian Group of Painters at the Vancouver Art Gallery

1962: Canadian Group of Painters at London Public Library & Art Museum

1964: Canadian Group of Painters at the Art Gallery of Hamilton and the Confederation Art Gallery and Museum, Charlottetown, P.E.I

1969: Marpole Art Gallery, Vancouver—exhibited with Grace Melvin

1974: Studio Gallery, West Vancouver

Artists' Greetings, Memorial University St. John's, Newfoundland
B.C. Shores and Trees, Studio Gallery, West Vancouver

1978: Studio Gallery, West Vancouver

1979: Studio Gallery, West Vancouver

Fine Arts Gallery, University of British Columbia

1980: Vancouver School of Art Early Years, 1925–1939, Charles Scott Gallery, Emily Carr College of Art, Vancouver

1982: B.C. Provincial Exhibition at Robson Square, Vancouver

1983: Vancouver: Art and Artists 1931–1983, Vancouver Art Gallery

1984: Richmond Interpretations : Richmond Art Gallery, Richmond, B.C.

1987: First Class: Four Graduates from the Vancouver School of Decorative and Applied Arts, 1929: The Floating Curatorial Gallery, Women in Focus, Vancouver, B.C.

1988: B.C. Artist, Vancouver Art Gallery

1989: Heffel Gallery Limited, Vancouver, B.C.

1995: Four Women, Vancouver Art Gallery

Visions of Integrity, Art Gallery of Greater Victoria

2015: Melancholy Bay: Images of English Bay, Burrard Inlet and Howe Sound from the Collection, Morris and Helen Belkin Art Gallery

2019–2020: Rapture, Rhythm and the Tree of Life: Emily Carr and her Contemporaries, Vancouver Art Gallery

== Collections ==
- Art Gallery of Greater Victoria, British Columbia Art Collection, Victoria, BC
- Morris and Helen Belkin Art Gallery, Vancouver, BC
- Vancouver Art Gallery
