= Irene Headin =

Canadian baseball player

- Pitcher
- Born: Saskatoon, Saskatchewan, Canada
- Bats: Right Throws: Right

Teams
- South Bend Blue Sox (1945)

Career highlights and awards
- Women in Baseball – AAGPBL Permanent Display at the Baseball Hall of Fame and Museum (unveiled in 1988); Canadian Baseball Hall of Fame and Museum Honorary Induction (1998)

Irene Headin was a Canadian pitcher who played in the All-American Girls Professional Baseball League (AAGPBL). She batted and threw right-handed.

Born in Saskatoon, Saskatchewan, Irene Headin was one of the 68 players born in Canada to join the All American League in its twelve-year history. She pitched for the South Bend Blue Sox in the 1945 season and recorded an inning of work without a decision.

In 1988, Headin received further recognition when she became part of Women in Baseball, a permanent display based at the Baseball Hall of Fame and Museum in Cooperstown, New York which was unveiled to honor the entire All-American Girls Professional Baseball League. She later gained honorary induction into the Canadian Baseball Hall of Fame in 1998 along with the other Canadian AAGPBL players.
