= Irene Evans =

Musician and educator

Irene Frances Ethel Evans (6 June 1906 – 9 November 1991) was a British soprano, pianist, community musical director and music teacher in Hanwell, Middlesex, UK.

== Early life ==
Evans was the second child of Herbert Albert Evans, a Great Western Railway clerk and amateur cellist, and Ethel May Evans, an amateur violinist. She grew up first at 11 Grove Avenue, Hanwell and then the newly completed 85 Cowper Road. After school, she studied piano at the Guildhall School of Music but, at the age of 15, her mother died and Irene took over the running of her father's home.

She lived in the family house for the rest of her life with her brother Ronald Herbert Evans, a railway clerk who led the viola section in the Ealing Symphony Orchestra. Although home-life took over in the 1920s, she was part of the Rainbow Concert Party which performed at Hanwell Library, raising funds for charity and directed the music for 'The Glenthorne Juveniles' performance in 1931 and the Perivale Players in 1935.

Her father died in that year and the 1939 Register shows Evans still listed as a home-keeper. She continued to lend her talents to various local groups, amongst others directing music for a production of Pygmalion at the Park Theatre, lending her musical support to Hanwell Cottage Hospital, and St Mellitus' Guides and Rangers. In the 1930s, she acted as accompanist at a concert for the South Place Ethical Society at Conway Hall (Central London) and on at least one occasion featured in their annual Orchestra concert.

Her aunt, Edith Dunstone, was conductor of the Hanwell Townswomen's Guild Choir which won the Ealing Festival Cup in 1939, the same year Evans won the advanced soprano solo competition. Evans also acted as their accompanist. In 1941 she was to stand in for her aunt as conductor on more than one occasion.

During the early 1940s Evans struck up a friendship with the Dutch-born composer and violinist John William Vis who eventually moved in as a lodger. Evans' choirs were later to premiere work by both Vis, and two of the choirs' chairmen, John William and Robert Docker, some of which she herself wrote the words for. It is likely that Viz's encouragement, together with that of her aunt, persuaded her to engage her passion for music more fully.

Amongst her performances at this time was one in November 1943 where she sang solo in a concert which also featured Vis, raising funds to send parcels to men then serving with the armed forces and another in March 1945 for Ealing Social Club for the Blind. In 1947 she performed alongside the bass Vincent Davis in the Ealing Musical Festival and was his accompanist in 1948 when he won the silver challenge cup at that year's London Music Festival.

== The Hanwell Girls Choir ==
It was around this time that she started teaching. In September 1950 Evans was persuaded by girls she had entered in the Ealing Festival to form her first choir. The Hanwell Girls Choir soon won funding from the Ealing Youth Service and was to continue until July 1983 when declining numbers made it untenable. At their final concert, the Mayor of Ealing described Evans as 'one of the best-loved people in the borough.'

== The Elthorne Singers ==
She had initially established a male voice choir but found it difficult to attract tenors. This chamber group became the Elthorne Singers, which provided succession for women who had reached the upper-age limit of the Hanwell Girls Choir (14-25). It first performed in conjunction with the Girls Choir in 1957 and was relaunched several times. In July 1982 four of her older male pupils joined the Girls' Choir in a one-off concert, which was to seed the Elthorne Singers' final relaunch in October the following year. The group continued to perform until her death in 1991.

== The Hanwell Children's Choir ==
In October 1958 she founded the Hanwell Children's Choir for 5-14 year olds which gave its first concert in St Mary's Church Hall just six months later. After scoring an impressive 90 at the Isleworth Music Festival in November 1959, the choir was publicly advised by Henry Noble (the composer who was adjudicating the competition) to audition for the BBC and within two years, the Middlesex County Times was describing Irene as a "champion of youth and music".

== Recordings/broadcasts ==
Under her directorship, the Hanwell Girls Choir were shortlisted for BBC talent contest 'Top Town' and recorded for audition at the BBC's Hammersmith Studios in December 1958 and performed at two Christmas Gala concerts, broadcast on BBC Radio 4 in 1968 and 1969. It also recorded twelve carols for TV in 1968. That year it was selected to represent the South East of England in the international choral competition Let the People Sing and the recording was scheduled to be broadcast on 4 January 1969, but seems never to have happened. They also appeared on BBC Radio 3's 'Sing We at Pleasure' in 1971. The Hanwell Children's Choir made three recordings in 1968 for the BBC schools' 'Music Workshop' broadcast on Radio 4. Recordings of the Hanwell Girls Choir and Hanwell Children's Choir were also recorded at Hanwell Methodist Church and Brentside School and reproduced non-commercially.

== Personal life ==
In an interview for the Middlesex County Times, Evans explained, "I have never been a confident person. I always need other people to tell me I can do things." "I must have someone to devote myself to. I'm a born wife and mother really...I love children and somehow they just respond to me without the need to shout...it isn't by choice that I am single. But there it is!"

== Legacy ==
Evans' choirs raised thousands of pounds for local charities at their numerous concerts and in May 1981 were recognized by the Mayor of Ealing with an Acorn Award for their fundraising efforts. The Middlesex County Times described Evans as having a "rare gift to communicate and win the confidence of her young singers".

Evans died after a long illness in November 1991 and her obituary noted that she was 'a Hanwell legend' who would 'be best remembered by the children who discovered a love of music.' The local Member of Parliament, Harry Greenway, wrote that December, 'Irene spared no effort' and engendered 'the spirit of Christmas.' The Ealing Festival awarded the Irene Evans Memorial Cup (and £25 prize money) to a junior for their presentation and entertainment value up until it suspended its vocal competition in 2019.

Among the many young people she worked with, the soprano Ann James went on to work for the BBC and teach singing on the Royal Academy of Music's theatre course.
