= Irene H. Schöne =

German environmental economist

Irene H. Schöne (born 1942 in Germany) has a PhD in politics and economics and has spent a career working in environmental economics, as well as writing and speaking on these issues.

== Career ==
She was an elected member of one of Hamburg's local councils from 1974 to 1978 and an elected member of the Hamburger Bürgerschaft, Hamburg's regional parliament from 1978 to 1982.

After working in marketing, she studied politics and economics in Hamburg and Kassel, achieving the master's degree Diplom Sozialoekomon. While at university in Hamburg, she initiated and managed the first "Summer University".

From 1983 to 1987 she became elected director of the Institute for Applied Ecology (Öko-Institut) in Freiburg, Europe's leading non-profit research and consultancy institution, establishing there the "Ecological Economy" group.

At Kassel University she worked for her PhD degree Dr. rerum politicarum, and published her thesis in the book "Ökologisches Arbeiten - Zur Theorie und Praxis ökologischen Arbeitens als Weiterentwicklung der marktwirtschaftlich organisierten Arbeit", in English: "Ecological Working" - Theory and Practice of Ecological Working beyond the Meaning of 'Labor' in a Market Economy".

She was a founding member of the Institute for Ecological Economy (IOEW) in Berlin and is a member of the IOEW's Scientific Council.

Irene H. Schöne worked from 1988 to 2004 as a scientific adviser for economics and finance at Schleswig-Holstein parliament in Kiel.

In 1997 she became head of the Environmental Council at the UmweltBank AG, Nürnberg, Germany's leading private green bank which specializes in financing environmental projects, and is today the Head of the Board of Non-Executive Directors.

=== Interests ===
The focus of her scientific work is modernizing economic theory, considering the environmental damage, climate change and loss of biodiversity. She has presented at conferences, edited and published books, and published numerous articles over the years primarily in Germany and the UK.

=== Fair Economics ===
Her latest book "Fair Economics - Nature, Money and People beyond neoclassical thinking" will be published in September 2015 by GREEN BOOKS, Cambridge, in the UK and four weeks later in Australia, Canada, New Zealand and the USA.

In the book she points out that today's mainstream economics has an understanding of nature and people derived from the 18th, no longer appropriate for the 21st century, and therefore in urgent need of modernization.
