= Espilä =

Finnish restaurant

Coordinates: 60.7110°N 28.7427°E

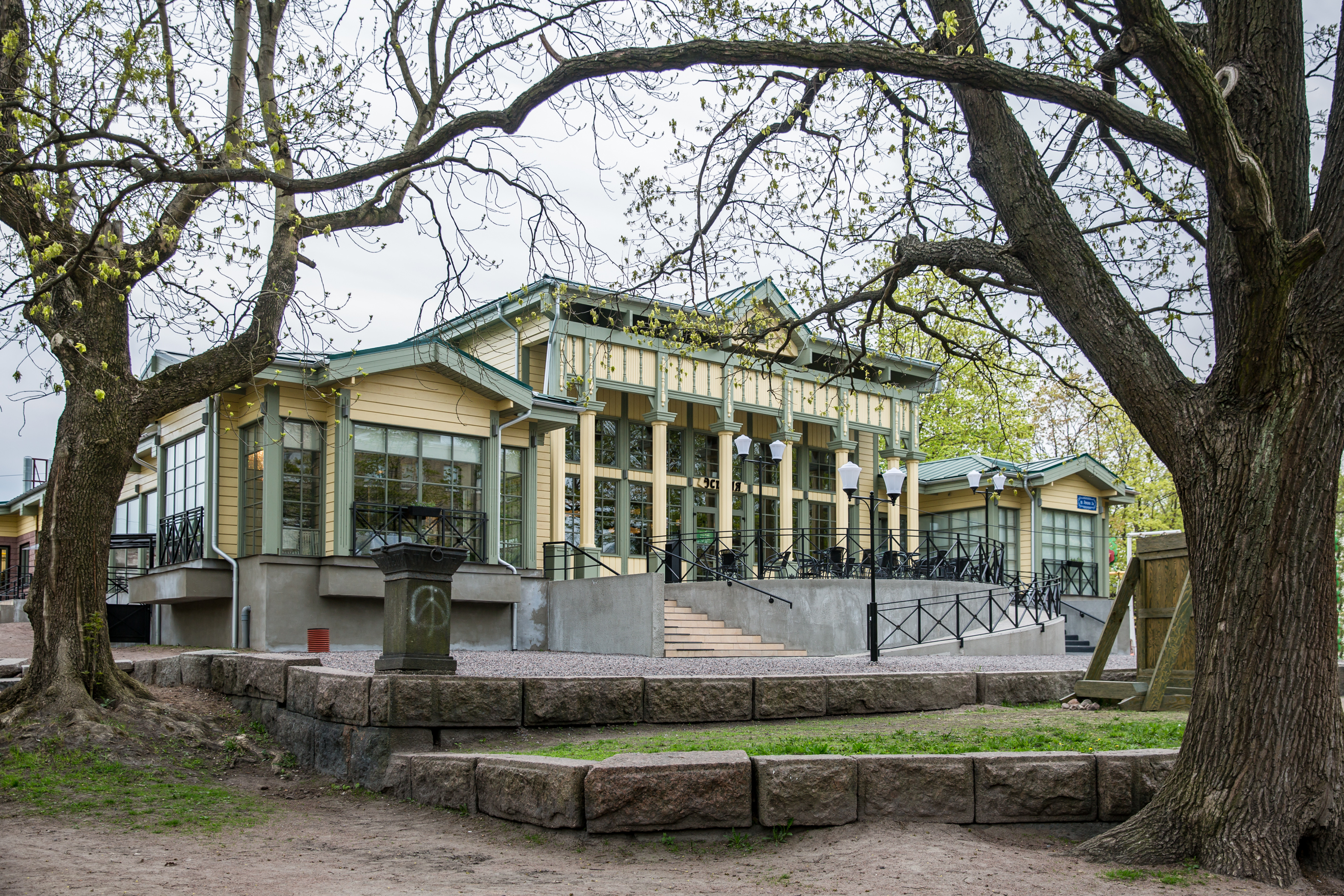
The new Espilä in Vyborg, built in the 2010s, resembles the original pavilion located on the same site.

Espilä was a restaurant that operated in Vyborg from 1890 to 1944 and in Helsinki from 1944 until the recession of the early 1990s. In Vyborg, it was known as one of the most important gathering places in Torkkelinpuisto (present-day Lenin park). In Helsinki, Espilä, located on Pohjoinen Rautatiekatu, became known as a dance and entertainment restaurant with striptease shows. In 2016, a new 200-seat Espilä opened in Vyborg, Russia, on the same site as the original.

== History ==
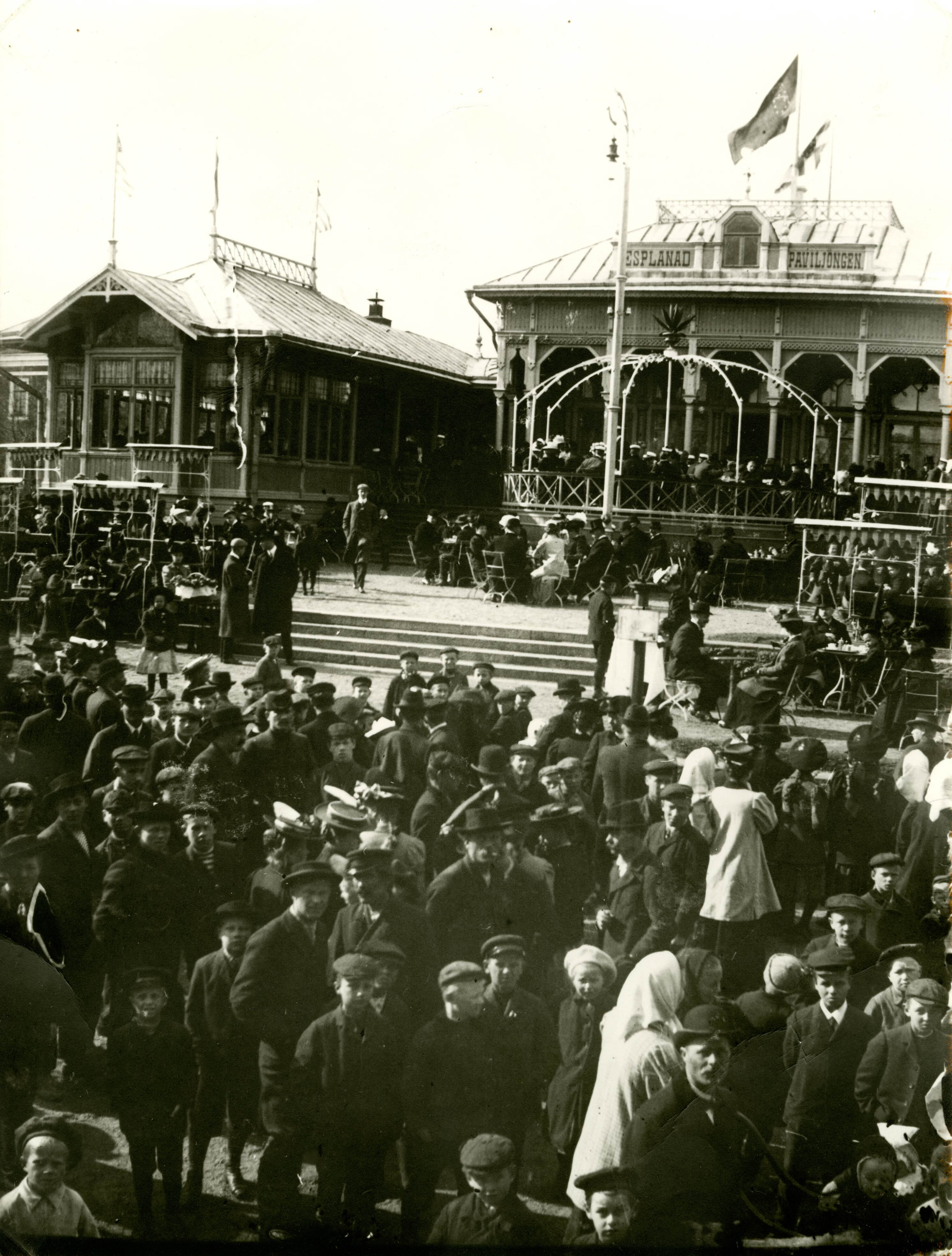
Espilä in Vyborg on May Day in 1910

=== Espilä in Vyborg ===
The first restaurant in Vyborg's Lenin Park was the Belvedere Hotel, built in 1868, which was destroyed by fire in 1887 and then moved to new premises outside the park. To remedy the shortage of restaurants in the park, a new white pavilion was built, designed by the former city architect of Vyborg, Brynolf Blomqvist.

The official name was Esplanaatipaviljonki. The name was considered difficult to pronounce, so the restaurant soon became known as Espilä among the people. The city's Swedish-language newspaper Wiborgsbladet considered the name ugly, and in Swedish Espilä was called Esplanadpaviljongen.

Espilä's first restaurateur was Albin Räsänen, after whose death in 1907 the restaurant was taken over by Valentin Kasubski, a Polish-born butler at the Imatra Hotel for a long time. Among other things, he equipped Espilä's kitchen with a rare freezing device at the time, which stored food at -12 degrees Celsius. The restaurant was popular with the townspeople, especially during the summer months that began with the summer holidays. The First World War brought difficulties to all of Vyborg's entertainment life, and after the war Kasubski sold Espilä to Emil Zimmerdahl, who sold it to Pekka Toropainen in 1920. In the same year Espilä was damaged in a fire but was restored to its former glory.

In the 1930s, after the repeal of Prohibition, Vyborg's restaurants began to flourish again, and under Toropainen's leadership, Espilä also succeeded alongside newcomers, such as the Round Tower, which Toropainen had opened in 1923. The 1935 Liquor Act prohibited dancing in restaurants, with the exception of first-class restaurants like Espilä, where dancing was allowed on Wednesdays and Sundays.

The pavilion burned down during the bombings of the Winter War.

== Vyborg's new Espilä ==
In 2016, the entrepreneurial couple Konstantin and Larisa Fomitsov opened the new Espilä (Russian: Эспиля) on the site of the former Espilä. The new building resembles an old lace pavilion in its shape, but its construction technology and interior are completely modern. The Fomitsovs have previously also founded restaurants in Vyborg called Siesta, Slavyanskaja Trapeza, and Matador, as well as a pastry shop called Kalabok.
