= Uno Ullberg =

Finnish architect

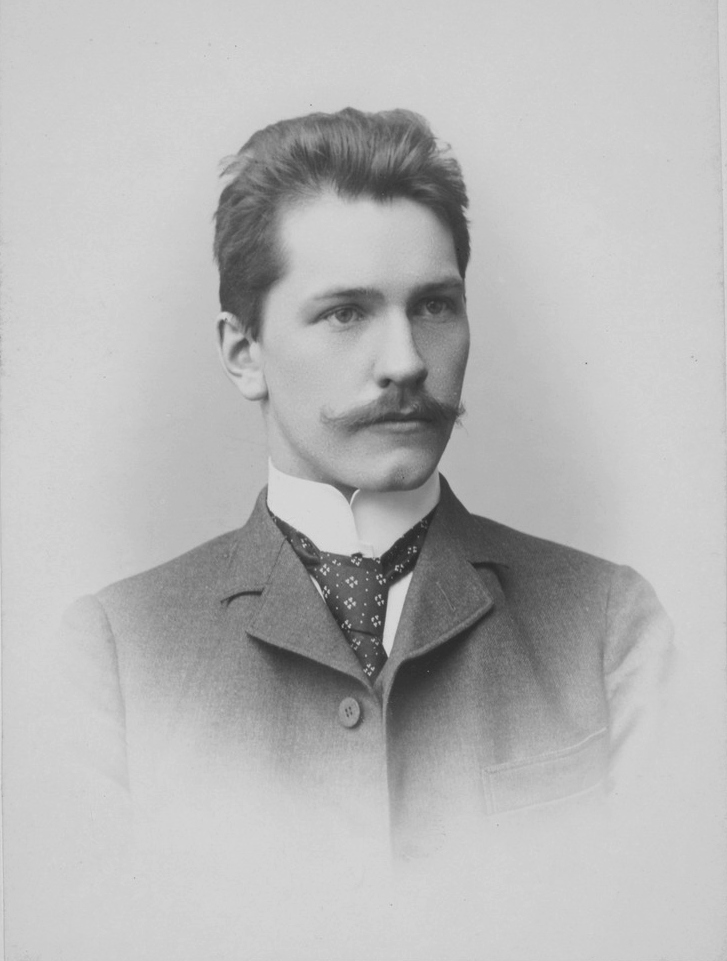
- Born: 15 February 1879; Viipuri, Grand Duchy of Finland, Russian Empire
- Died: 12 January 1944 (aged 64); Helsinki, Finland
- Occupation: Architect
- Buildings: Viipuri Art Museum and Drawing School, 1931 Viipurin Panttilaitos Oy Building, 1931 Viipuri Hospital Maternity and Women's Wards, 1937
- Projects: Viipuri Reconstruction, after the Finnish army regained control of Viipuri, 1940

Uno Werner Ullberg (15 February 1879 in Viipuri – 12 January 1944 in Helsinki) was a famous Finnish architect.

== Background ==
Educated in Helsinki, Ullberg returned to his home town Viipuri in 1906. He drew most of his buildings in Viipuri, but during the last years of his life also in Finland's capital Helsinki.

During 1812–1917 Viipuri was a part of the autonomous Grand Duchy of Finland. It was the second largest city of independent Finland as of 1917. After being conquered by the Soviet Union's red army in both 1940 during the Winter War and then again in 1944 during the Continuation War, it then became a part of the Soviet Union under the Russian name Vyborg after the 1947 peace treaty in Paris, France. When the Soviet Union disbanded itself in 1991, it became a part of Russia.

The style of Ullberg’s architecture covers the transition in architecture from so-called Nordic Classicism of the 1920s to Functionalism during the 1930s. Ullberg is regarded as a leading architect of the Nordic Classicism period and was the first to introduce Functionalism to Viipuri. Though his most notable buildings were constructed in Viipuri, he became famous not only in his native town but nationwide.

== Education and early works ==
As a child Ullberg had studied at the Viborgs konstvänners ritskola art school, where later also, in 1906–1913, he was a teacher. Ullberg graduated in 1901 from the architectural faculty at the Helsinki Polytechnic Institute (Polytekniska institutet in Swedish), now Aalto University. After graduating he worked as an architect at the offices of Nyström, Petrelius & Penttilä in Helsinki.

After returning in 1906 to his native city, he opened an architectural bureau together with Axel Gyldén, who had studied with him in Helsinki. Together they designed Hackman House, completed in 1909, for the Hackman industrialist family. Afterwards, the partnership broke up when Ullberg decided to start working under his own name. He ran his own architect office in Vyborg in 1910–1932 and was the Vyborg city architect from 1932 until 1936, during which time he controlled the urban conception of the city and worked on the Master plan. While living in Vyborg he had also for many years been a city counselor. In 1936 he moved to Helsinki to become head of the building department of the Finnish National Board of Health in 1936–1941.

The most important work created in collaboration with Gyldén was the headquarters of Hackman & Co (1909) at Piispankatu 14 in Viipuri. The building represents the compositional and formal variations of Jugendstil, Art Nouveau or National Romanticism. The main elevation pediments, openings, window frames, portals, and the granite facades are quite typical of National Romanticism, which at that time was also the prevailing architectural style in Finland for key public buildings, most notably in the works of architects Gesellius, Lindgren, and Saarinen (e.g. Finnish Pavilion at Exposition Universelle (1900), Paris, and National Museum of Finland, Helsinki [1902–1904].) The interiors of the building were among the most stylish and rich in the city. The inside of the house survived harmful transformations during the Soviet period so the interior decorations were greatly damaged.

Between 1910 and 1930 he designed a large number of public buildings and houses, most of which are situated in Viipuri. Among these are several office buildings in Käkisalmi, Imatra and other Finnish towns.

The early works in Viipuri could be described as traditional town architecture with a classicistic influence. The most interesting examples from this period include the reconstruction of the Union Bank (originally built in 1900), the Karjala offices (1929), the store and residence of V. Dippel (1921) and the restoration of the famous medieval Round Tower in the middle of the old city centre. Ullberg converted the massive old building into a restaurant and cafe.

== From Classicism to Functionalism ==
The most important period in Ullberg's architect career is connected with the "White Era" of Functionalist architecture. However, some of his important works can be considered as marking a transition from Nordic Classicism to Functionalism during the 1920s and early 1930s.

Ullberg found his own unique conception and interpretation of functionalistic architecture. The main aspect of his philosophy is the connection between the functional and the classical. In his early works Ullberg used as his basis Nordic Classicism, emphasizing reductive common elements from Classicism. The most important works of the era became Ullberg's reply to the serious social needs of the city. Among these works are the Viipuri Art Museum and Drawing School (1930), the Viipuri Panttilaitos Oy Building (1931), the Viipuri Provincial Archives (1933), and the Viipuri Maternity Hospital (1937).

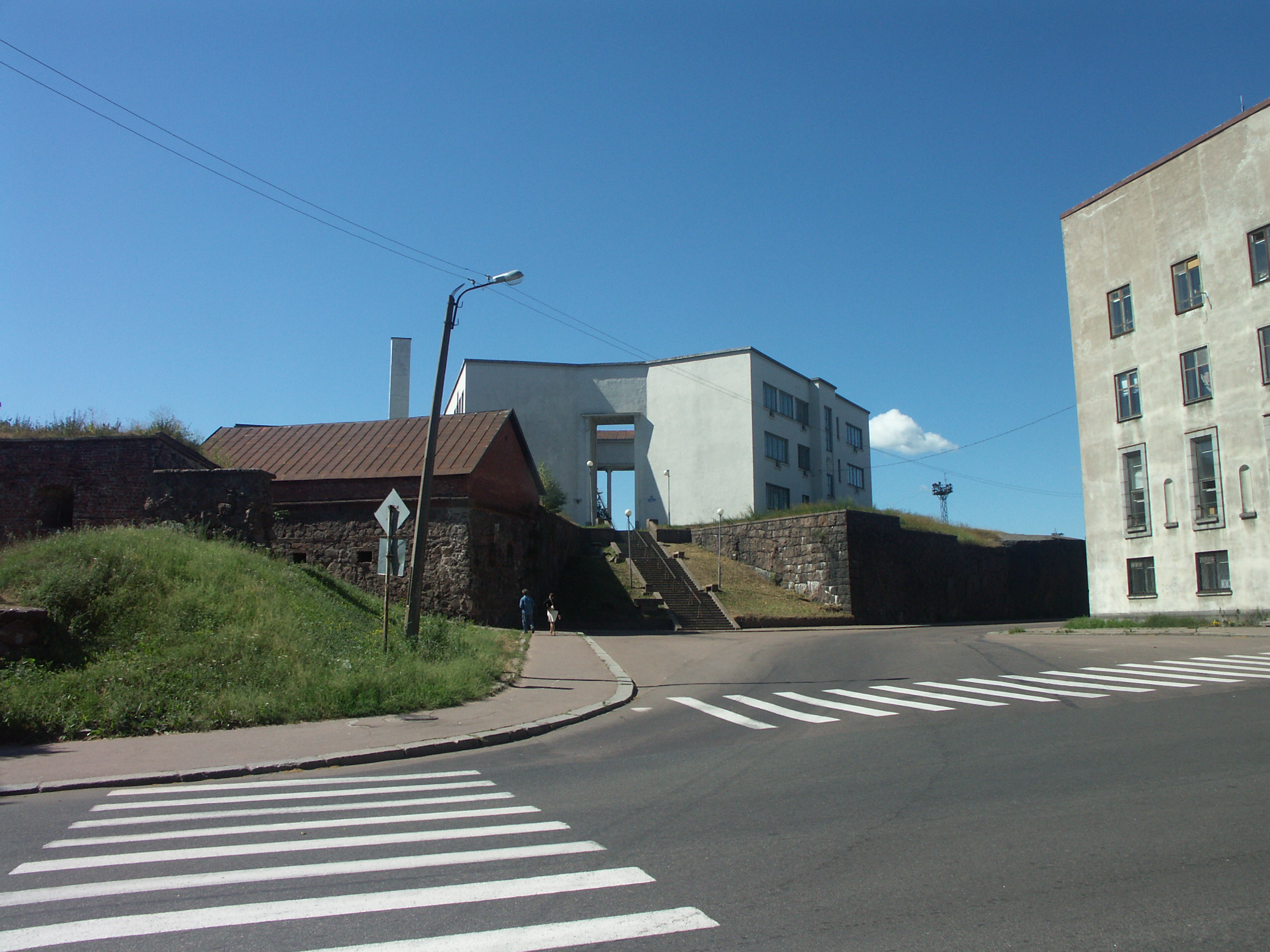
Viipuri Art Museum and Drawing School (1930) in Vyborg, Russia

The most important of Ullberg's works is the combined Viipuri Art Museum and Drawing School. Completed in October 1930, the building is situated near the 16th Century Pantsarlahti Bastion at the southern end of the city. Contrasting with its fortress surroundings, the white-stuccoed building commands the view over the South Harbour and the approach from the sea. The massing of the building comprises two wings (the Art Museum on the east wing, and the Drawing School on the west) placed at an angle to each other, with a wedge-shaped, paved courtyard separating the two. The wider part of the courtyard faces south-west, towards the harbour, and there is an imposing twin-row of Classical columns with a rectangular cross-section supporting an equally stylistic curving architrave, doubling as a corridor that connects the two buildings. The approach to the museum from the city is through a series of flights of steps leading to an opening, set at an angle, between the windowless north walls of the wings. The walls facing south are almost as austere, with the central colonnade acting as the focal point.

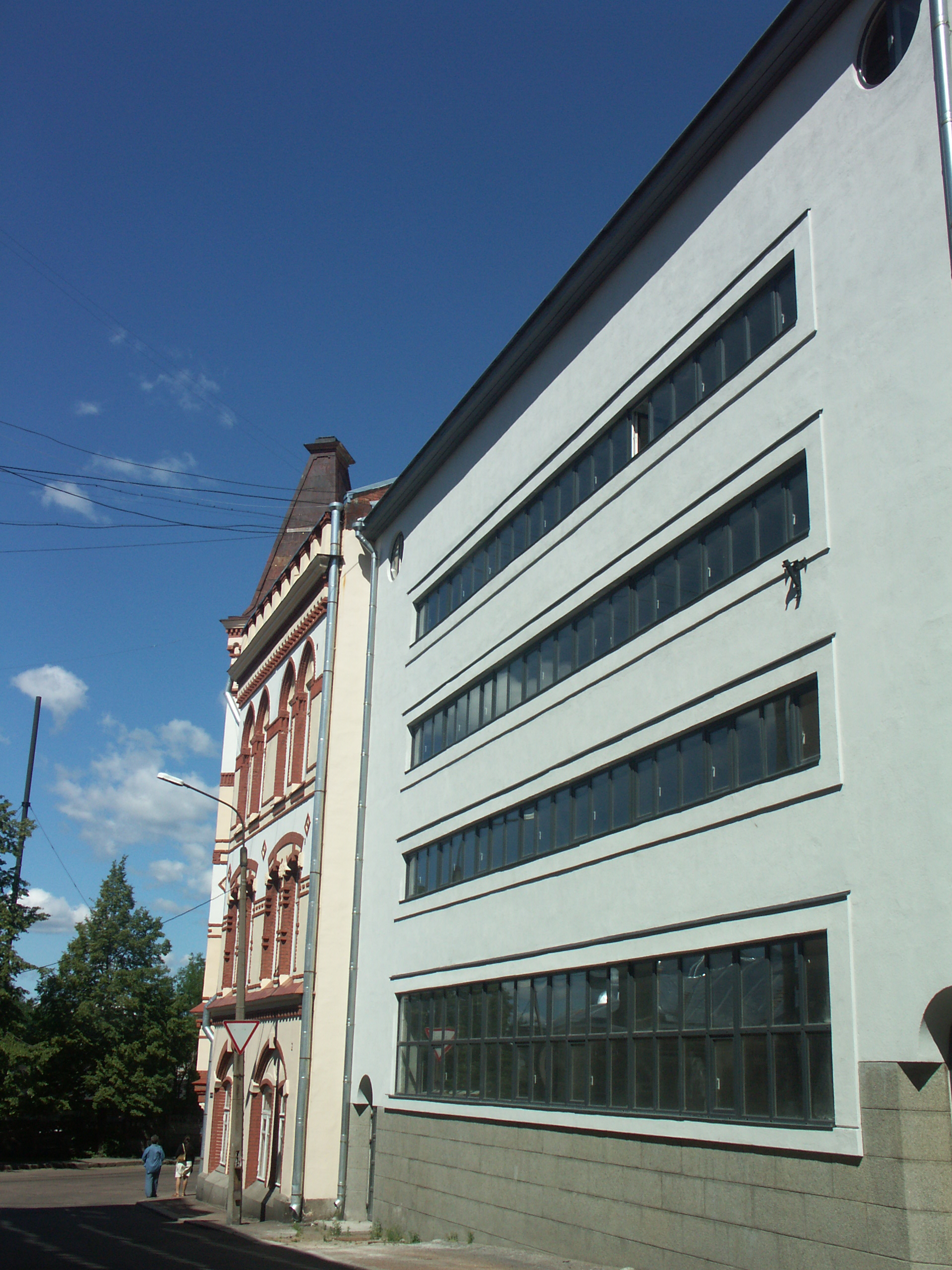
Viipuri Panttilaitos Oy (1931) in Vyborg, Russia

The four-storey building of the Viipuri Panttilaitos Oy was the first completed example of Functionalist movement in the city. It has as many rows of distinct, very simplified bands of windows, or rather, more like four very wide windows with very thin mullions. The first floor fenestration consists of a double row of windows, 22 in a row (that are hinged from the bottom, opening downwards), while the upper three only have one. The bold fenestration is enabled by the use of a solid reinforced concrete girderless framework with "mushroom form" columns that free the brick facade of its load-bearing function. The cross-section of columns on the last stage is much smaller than on the first one, it's because of the increase of mechanical tension down from the roof the basement.

Ullberg was very successful in designing medical facilities. During the White Era he built a number of hospitals in Viipuri. In 1936 Ullberg moved to Helsinki where he became the head of the architectural bureau of the Finnish National Board of Health, and among his tasks was the planning of the Meilahti Hospital area, including the Children's Hospital, completed in 1946 after his death.

Ullberg's most notable architectural design in Helsinki is Bensow House on Eteläesplaadi, completed for the Bensow trading company. While on the outside the seven-storey building is typically Functionalist in its expression, in the interior it has numerous features typical of Art Deco, such as the use of chrome, brick tiles and neon signs.

After the Winter War with the Soviet Union, and following a short period in 1941 when Vyborg was occupied by the Soviet Union, Vyborg was handed back to Finland, Ullberg quickly drew up a plan for the reconstruction for his native town, but there was no opportunity to implement the plan because the entire city was annexed to the Soviet Union in 1944.

Ullberg died in Helsinki in 1944 at the age of 65. His gravestone at Hietaniemi Cemetery in Helsinki was designed by Finnish architect and designer Alvar Aalto.

An exhibition of the life and works of Uno Ullberg, titled UNO ULLBERG – AN ARCHITECT FROM FINNISH VYBORG, was held at the Museum of Finnish Architecture, Helsinki, in the summer of 2010.

== Important buildings ==
- 1909, Headquarters of "Hackman & Co", Vyborg, Russia
- 1911–1915, Finland Trade Bank offices and residence, Vyborg, Russia
- 1913, United Northern Bank Building, Sortavala, Russia
- 1915, Bank Office, Sortavala, Russia
- 1921, trade-house and residence of V. Dippel, Vyborg, Russia
- 1929, "Karjala" offices, Vyborg, Russia
- 1930, Apartment house with public spaces, Vyborg, Russia
- 1930, Viipuri Art Museum and Drawing School, Vyborg, Russia
- 1930, Hospital Building, Vyborg, Russia
- 1931, Viipurin Panttilaitos Oy Building, Vyborg, Russia
- 1932, Swedish-German Pietari-Paavali (Peter and Paul) Lutheran congregation, Vyborg, Russia
- 1932–1933, Viipuri Provincial Archives, Vyborg, Russia
- 1933 Vyborg Stadium, Vyborg, Russia
- 1935, Bus Station Office, Sortavala, Russia
- 1936, Villa Solkulla Espoo, Finland
- 1937, Viipuri Hospital Maternity and Women's Wards, Vyborg, Russia
- 1937, Reconstruction of Bus Station, Vyborg, Russia
- 1938, Renovation of Round Tower, Vyborg, Russia
- 1940, Bensow House, Helsinki, Finland
- 1946, Children's Hospital, Helsinki, Finland
