= Avangard Stadium (Vyborg) =

Sports venue in Vyborg, Russia

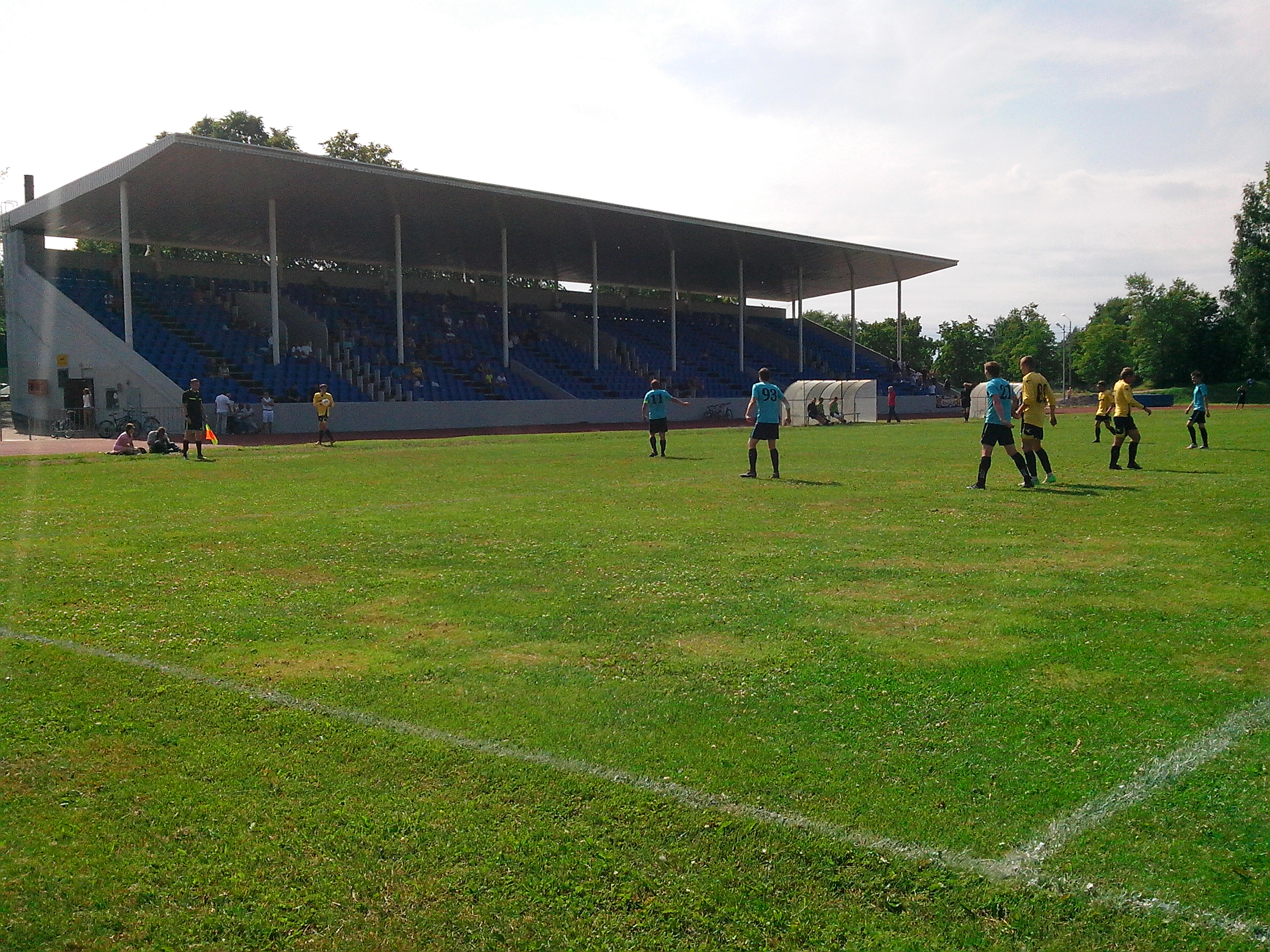
- Interactive map of Avangard Stadium
- Location: Vyborg, Russia
- Coordinates: 60.7015°N 28.7569°E
- Owner: City of Vyborg
- Capacity: 3,500
- Surface: Grass; 105m x 75m

Construction
- Opened: 1933
- Architect: Uno Ullberg

Tenant
- FK Favorit

Avangard Stadium (Russian: Cтадион Авангард) is a multi-purpose stadium in Vyborg, Leningrad Oblast, Russia. It was completed in 1933 by the design of the Finnish architect Uno Ullberg.

== History ==
Avangard Stadium was opened in 1933 as Viipurin keskusurheilukenttä, the ″Vyborg Central Sports Stadium″, when Vyborg was a part of Finland. The stadium had a main stand with 5,500 seats, and a standing section for more than 10,000 spectators. It was considered as the most modern sports stadium in Finland.

Vyborg stadium was the home ground of the football club Sudet, and hosted the 1937 Finnish Championships in Athletics. It was also planned as a venue for the football matches of the cancelled 1940 Summer Olympics.

The stadium was severely damaged in the World War II. After the war, Vyborg was ceded to the Soviet Union, and the renovated stadium was renamed as Avangard Stadium.
