= Hermitage-Vyborg Center =

Museum in Vyborg, Russia

Coordinates: 60.708367°N 28.737466°E

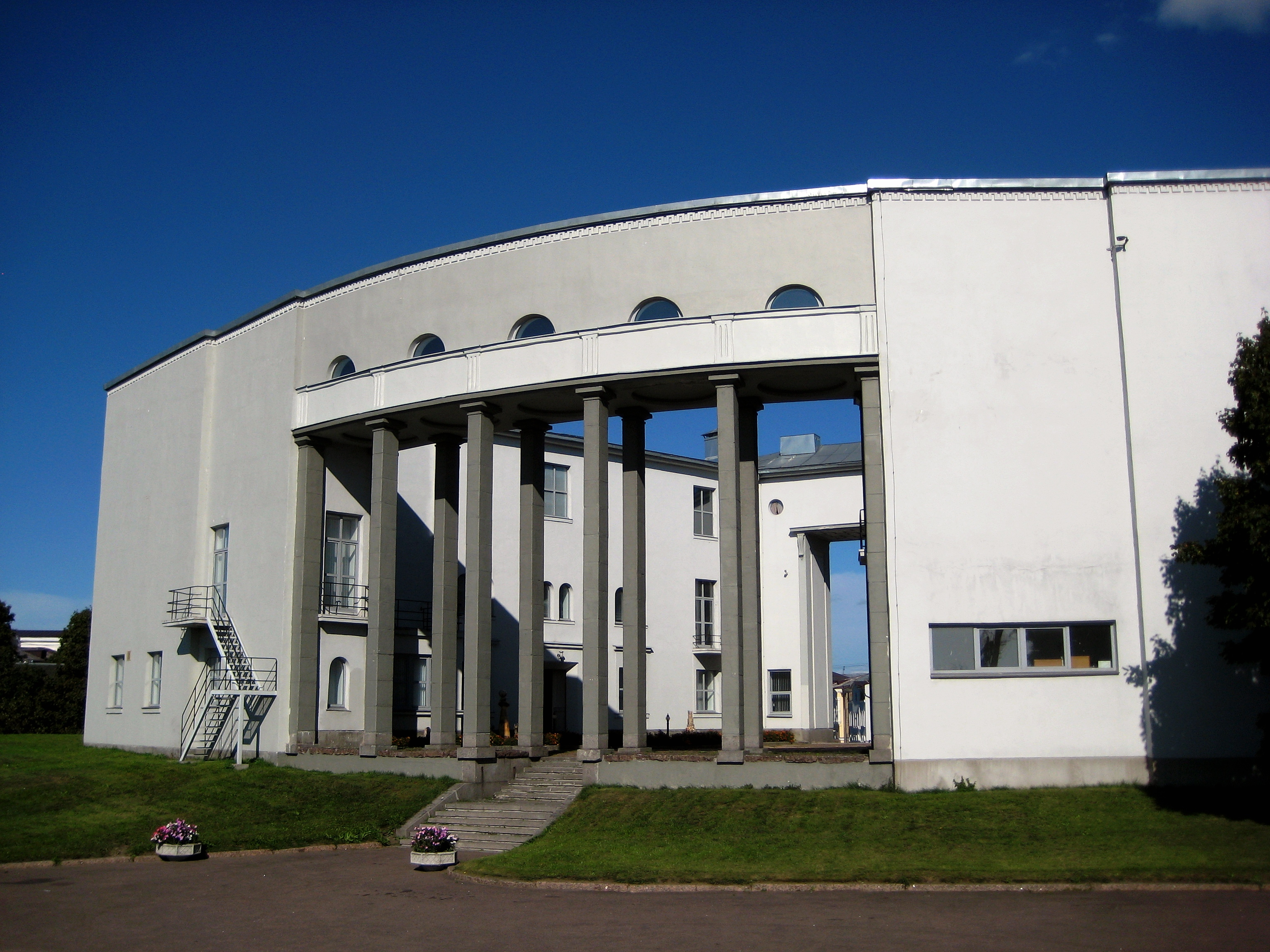
The Hermitage-Vyborg Center is located on the top of Panzerlachs Bastion.

The Hermitage-Vyborg Center (Russian: Выставочный центр "Эрмитаж-Выборг") is an external branch of the Saint Petersburg based Hermitage Museum in the Karelian town of Vyborg. The museum was opened in 2010. Hermitage-Vyborg Center is located in the Vyborg Art Museum and Drawing School building (1930), which was designed by the Finnish architect Uno Ullberg.

== History ==
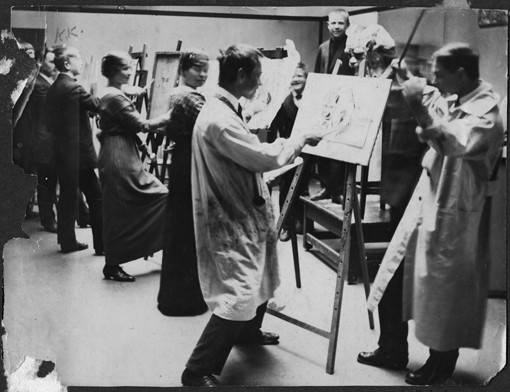
Art school students in the mid-1910s

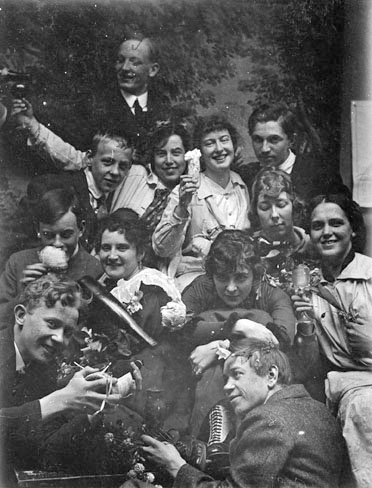
Art school students celebrating in the mid-1910s.

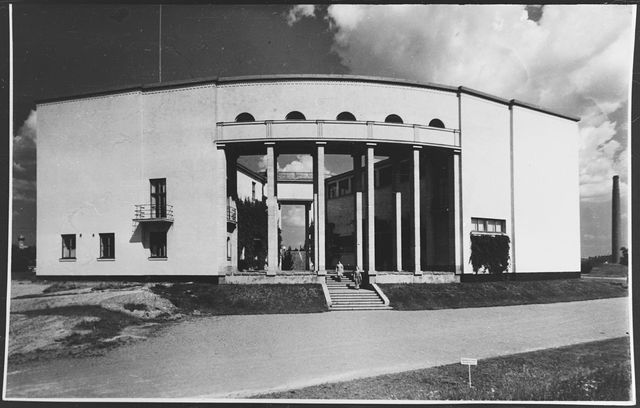
Vyborg Art Museum in 1930

Vyborg Art Museum and Drawing School was built in 1929–1930 when the town was a part of Finland. The classicism and functionalism style building is located on top of the 16th-century Panzerlachs Bastion, which was one of the fortifications of the Vyborg town wall. Like Alvar Aalto's famous Vyborg Library, it is another remarkable piece of Finnish-era modern architecture in Vyborg.

The museum had a large collection of Finnish and European art as well as works of various Russian masters. Vyborg was the second largest city in Finland and the Vyborg Art Museum was considered the country's second-most significant art museum, next to the Ateneum in Helsinki. It was severely damaged during World War II and the collections were relocated to several Finnish art museums. After the war, Vyborg became a part of the Soviet Union and the building was renovated for administrative use.

The latest renovations took place in the early 2000s. A children's art school was opened in 2003 and the Hermitage-Vyborg Center project was launched in November 2007. The branch museum was finally opened in June 2010.

== Sources ==
- The Hermitage-Vyborg Center The State Hermitage Museum
