= Ripatti =

Ripatti is a Finnish surname. Notable people with the surname include:

- Pertti Ripatti (1930–2016), Finnish diplomat and lawyer
- Vladislav Delay (born 1976), real name Sasu Ripatti, Finnish electronic musician
