= Round Tower (Vyborg) =

Coordinates: 60.712979°N 28.737649°E

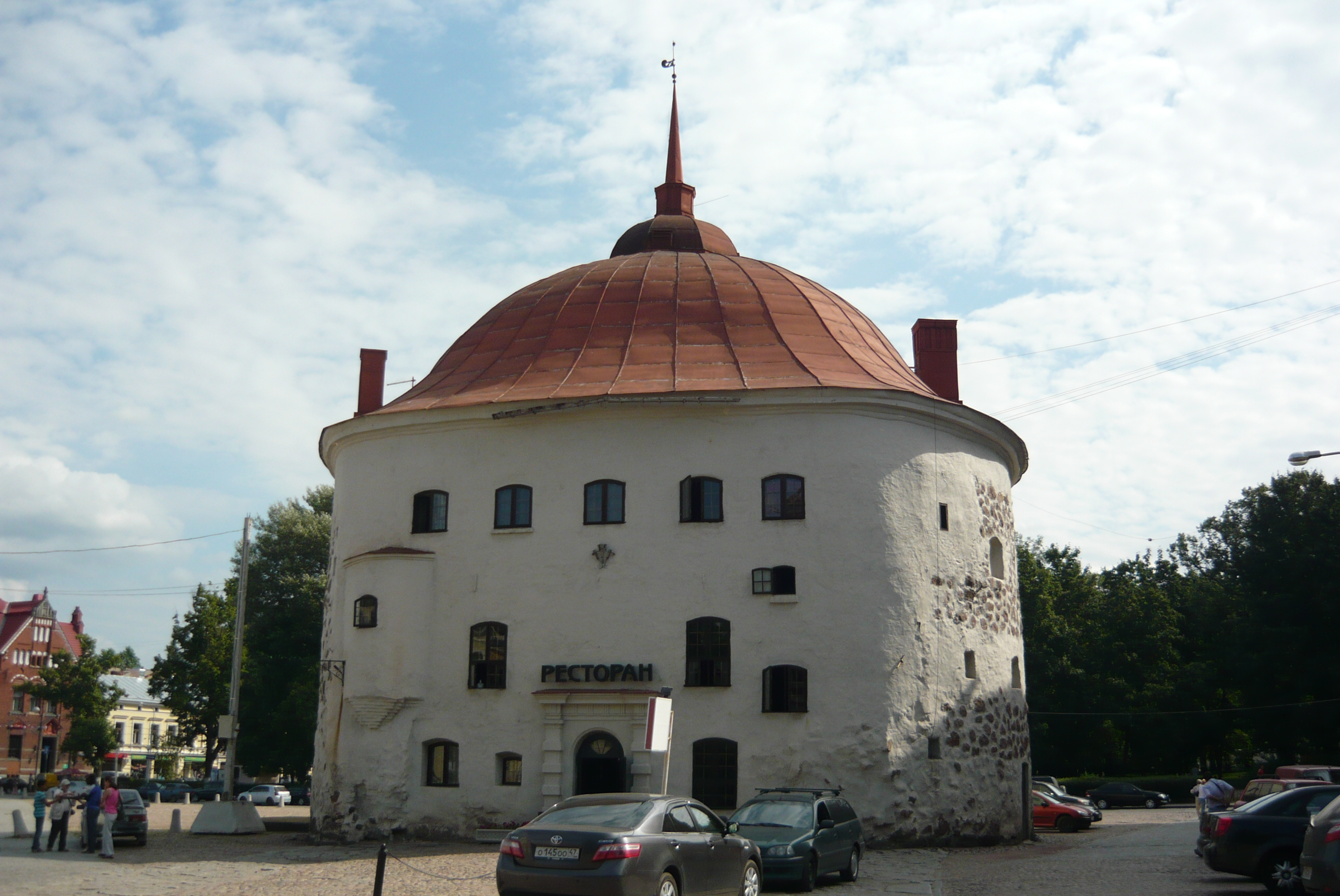
Round Tower in Vyborg

Round Tower (Russian: Круглая башня, Finnish: Pyöreä torni, Swedish: Runda tornet) is a fortification at the market square of Vyborg. It was built in 1547–1550 by the order of Gustav I of Sweden as a part of the medieval town wall. Today it serves as a restaurant and is one of the most popular sights in Vyborg.

Round Tower was originally an arsenal. It was later used as a prison called "The Mutton Prison", a warehouse and since 1861 by the city magistrate. In 1938, as Vyborg was part of Finland, the tower was renovated for restaurant use after the design of architect Uno Ullberg. Tower's diameter is approximately 21 meters (69 feet).
