= Vyborg town wall =

1470s-1860s in the now-Russian town

Coordinates: 60.7079°N 28.7379°E

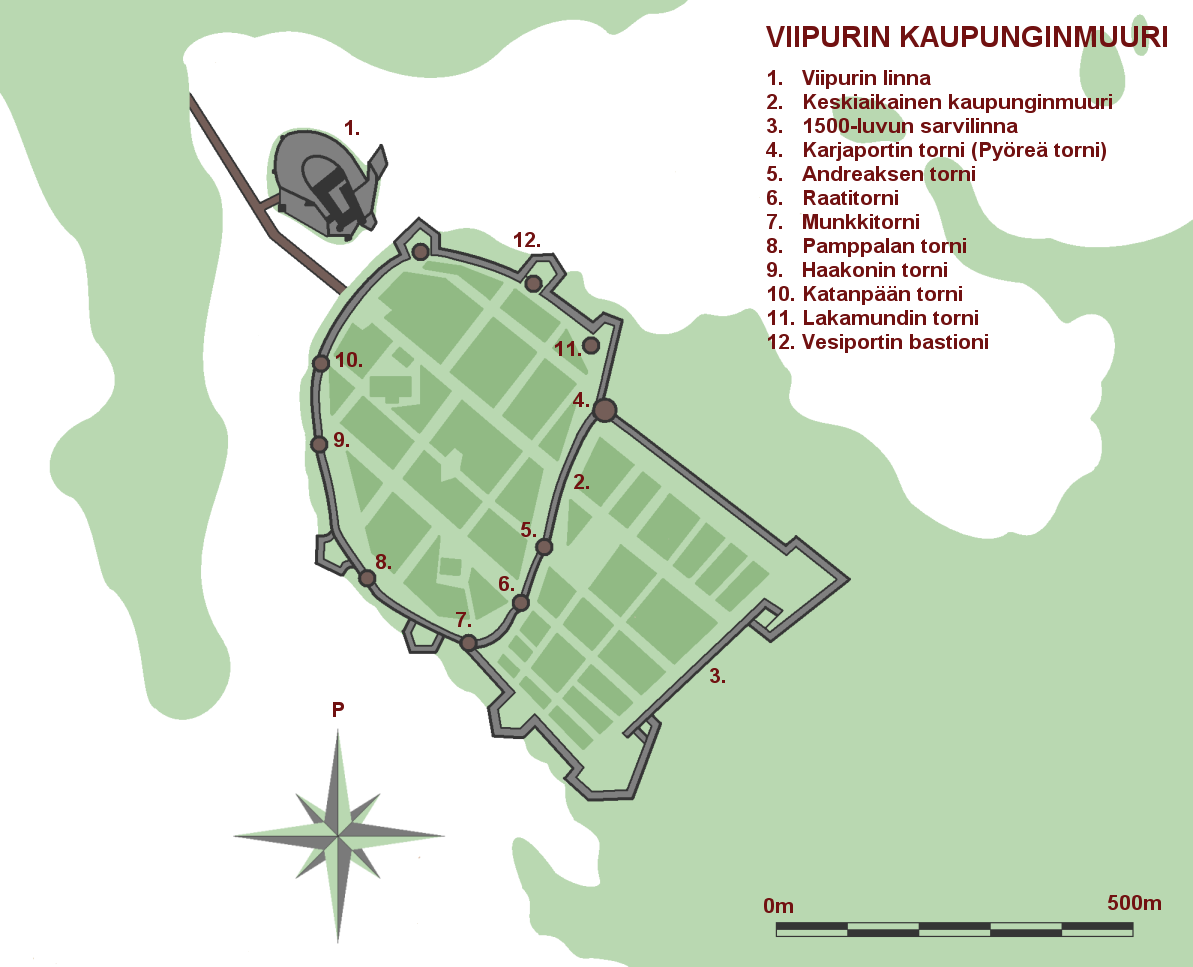
Vyborg town wall and the "Horn Fortress" in 1750

The Vyborg town wall (Russian: Выборгская городская стена, Finnish: Viipurin kaupunginmuuri, Swedish: Viborgs stadsmur) was a defensive structure built around the town of Viborg (today Vyborg, Russia). It was completed during the Swedish era in the 1470s and demolished mainly in the 1860s as Vyborg was a part of the Grand Duchy of Finland. Some minor parts of the wall are still preserved as well as two round towers.

== History and construction ==
The foundations of the Viborg town wall were laid by Erik Axelsson Tott, the stadtholder of Viborg Castle. It was constructed by the same builders who completed the St. Olaf's Castle in 1475–1477. They were most likely invited from Tallinn. The wall was 5–6 meters high and had originally 10 towers with a combination of circular and square designs. Two of them, the Town Hall Tower and the Round Tower, built in 1540s, are still preserved. In the late 16th century the wall was strengthened with several bastions and the so-called "Horn Fortress", located east from the original wall. The only remaining bastion is the Panzerlachs Bastion at the south-west corner of the Horn Fortress.

According to legends, one of the towers exploded during the Russo-Swedish War in 1495 and the Russian invaders escaped in great fear. The incident is known as the Viborg blast.

== Gallery ==
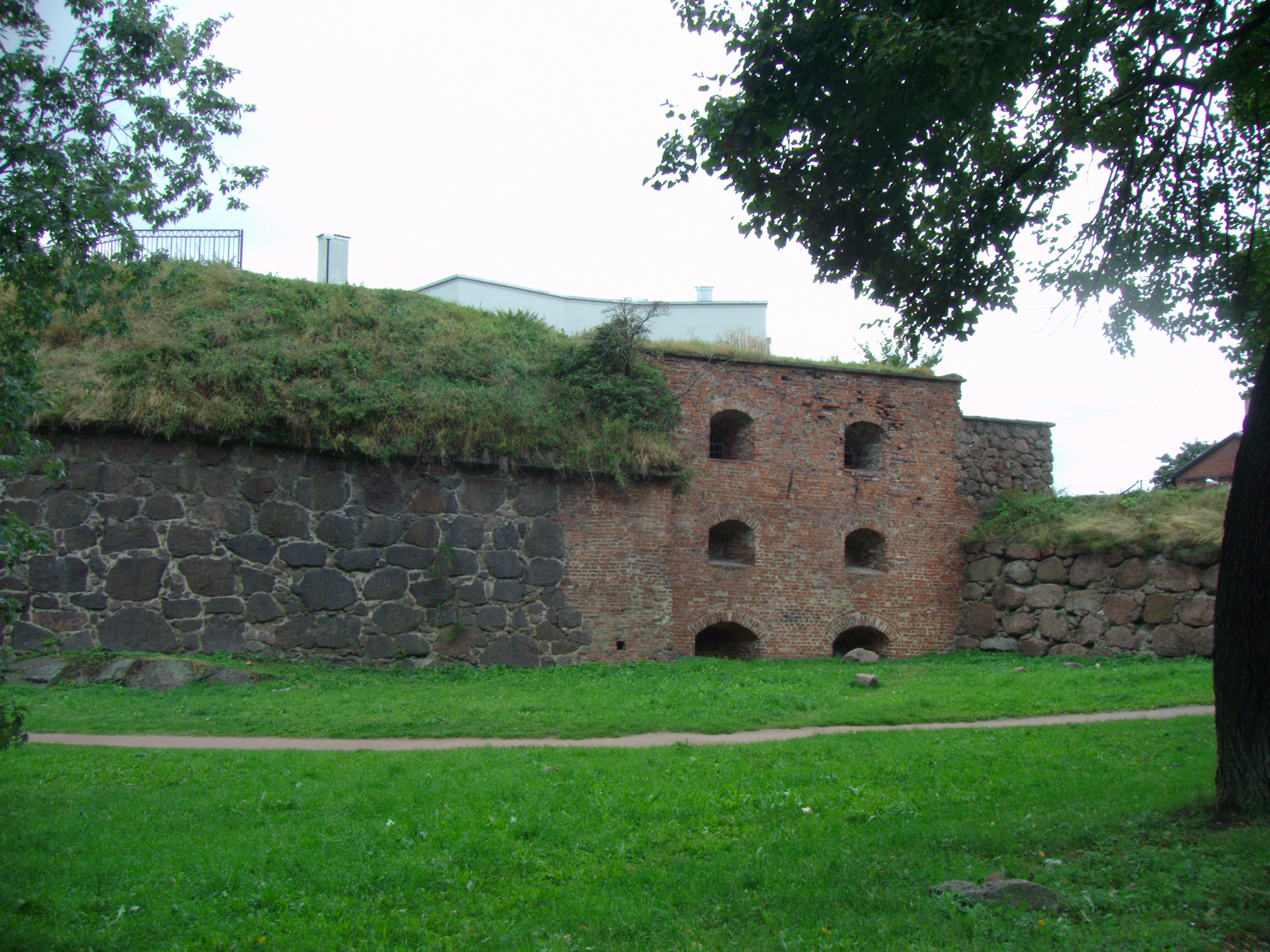
The Panzerlachs Bastion

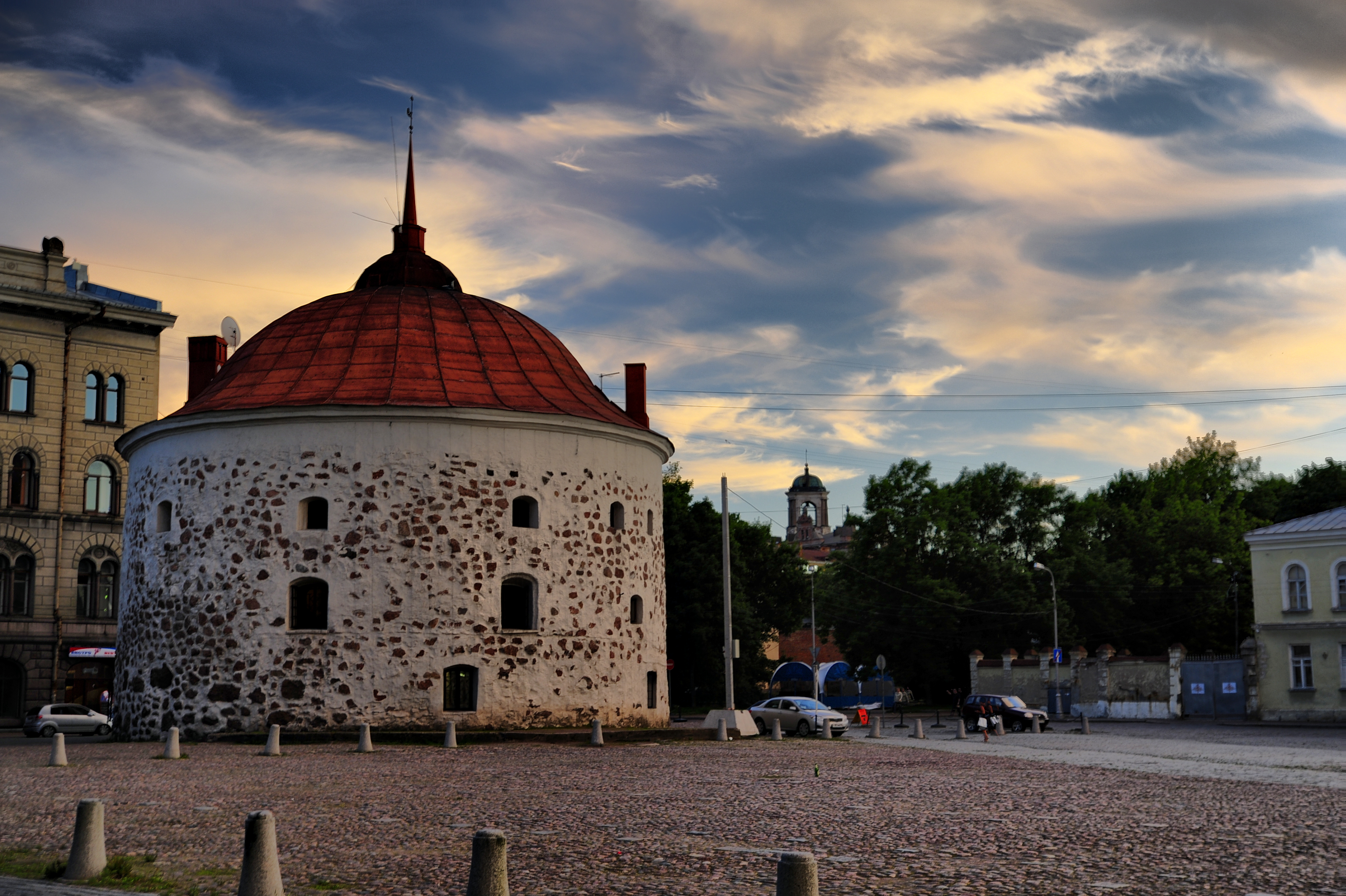
The Round Tower

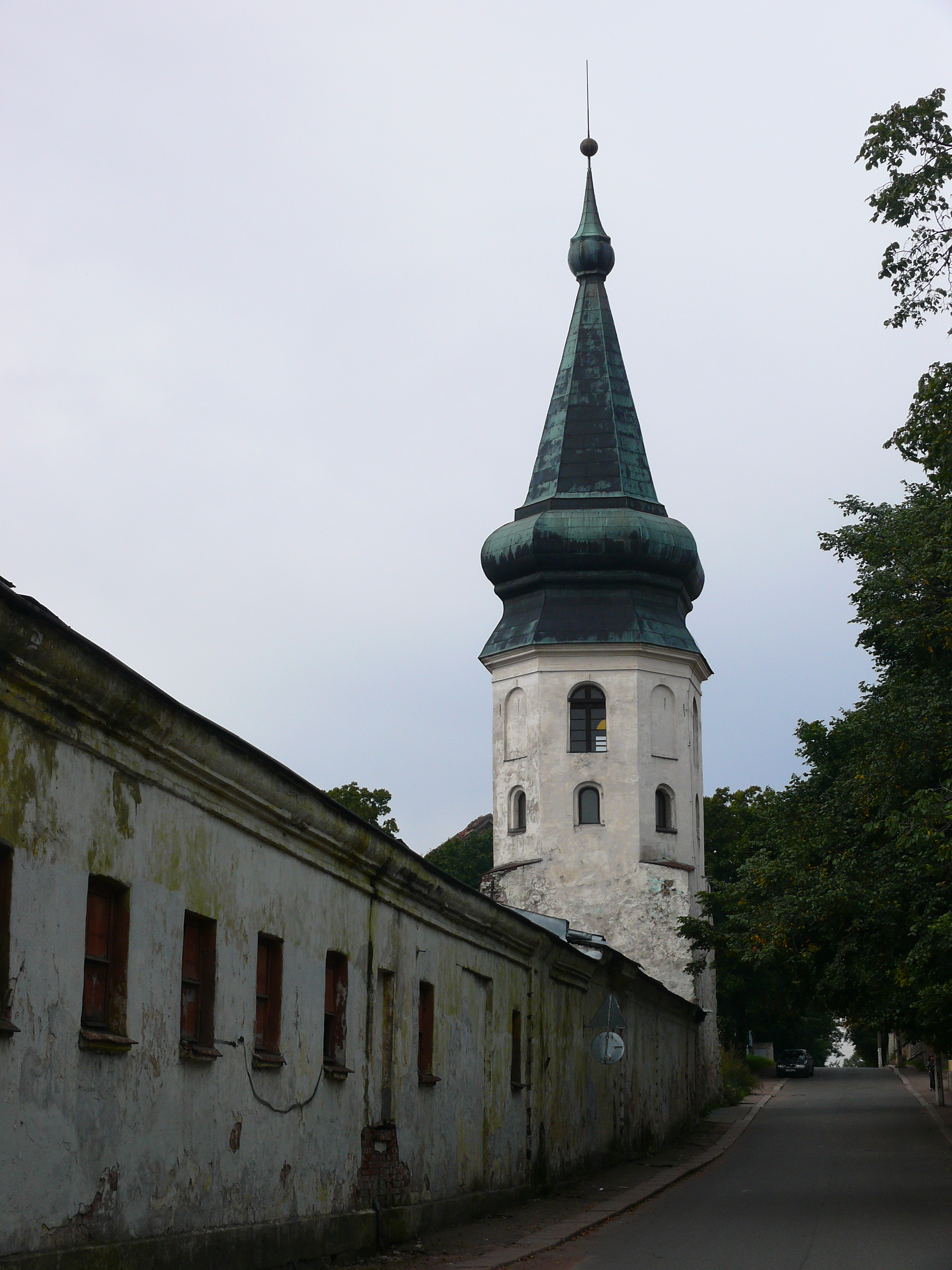
The Town Hall Tower

== See also ==
- Siege of Vyborg (1710)

== Sources ==
- History of the fortresses from the Middle Ages to the early 19th century Castles and Fortifications in Finland
