= Pertti Ripatti =

Finnish diplomat and lawyer (1930–2016)

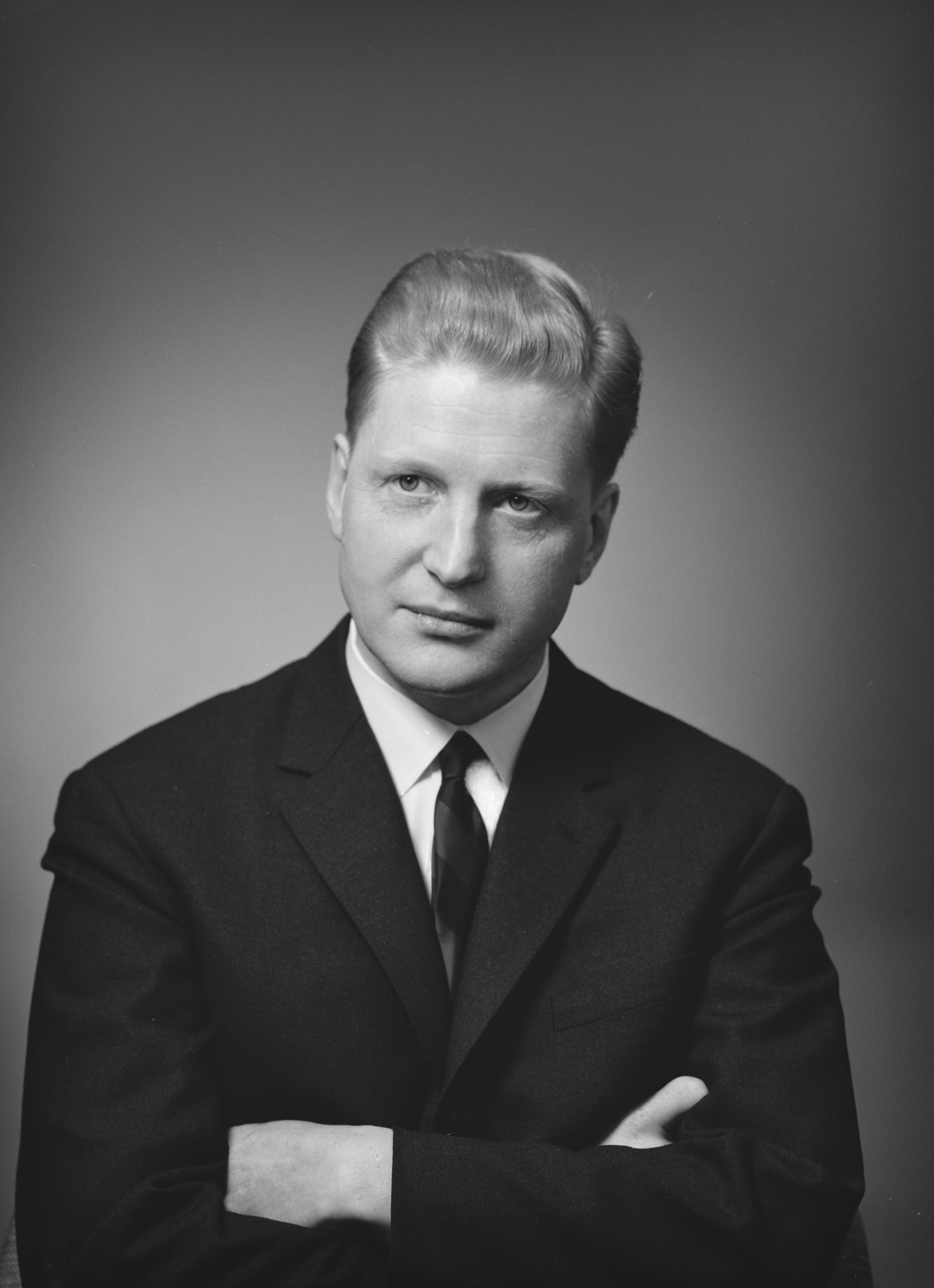
Pertti Ripatti in 1966.

Pertti Justus Ripatti (31 May 1930 – 2 January 2016) was a Finnish diplomat and lawyer.

Ripatti was born in Viipuri. His father was Justus Ripatti, who served as a state mediator. Before his diplomatic career, he was from 1962 to 1977 employed in The Finnish Employers' Confederation and then in the Ministry of Finance.

He was a Finnish Ambassador to Kuwait from 1981 to 1985 and was accredited in 1982 to Abu Dhabi. He was an Ambassador to Caracas from 1985 to 1989 and to Kuala Lumpur from 1989 to 1992 and Consul to New York from 1992 to 1995.

He died in Westchester, United States, aged 85.
