= Vyborg =

Town in Leningrad Oblast, Russia

Vyborg Выборг Viipuri / Viborg (Finnish / Swedish)
- Town

Other transcription(s)
  - Finnish / Swedish: Viipuri / Viborg
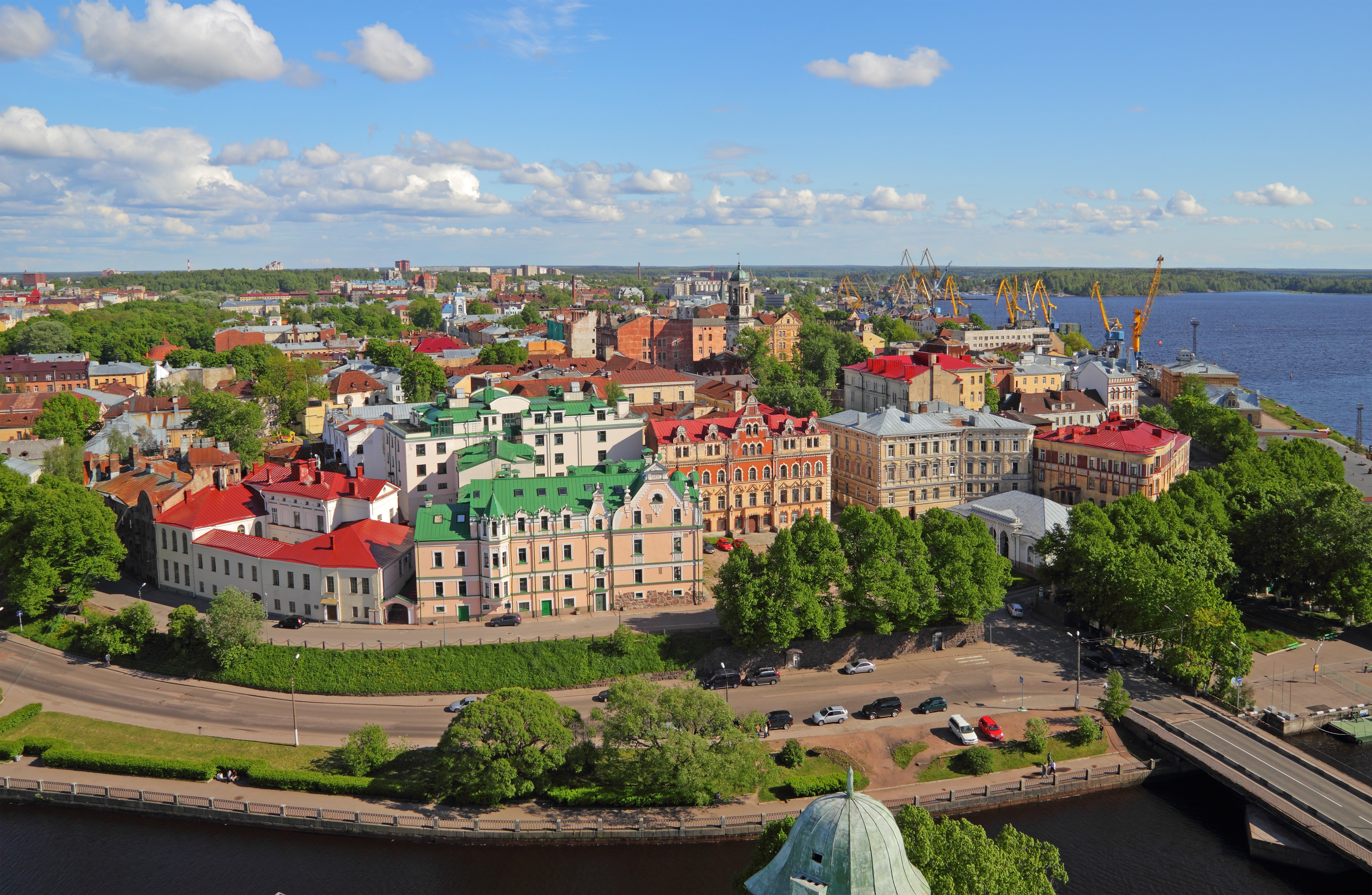
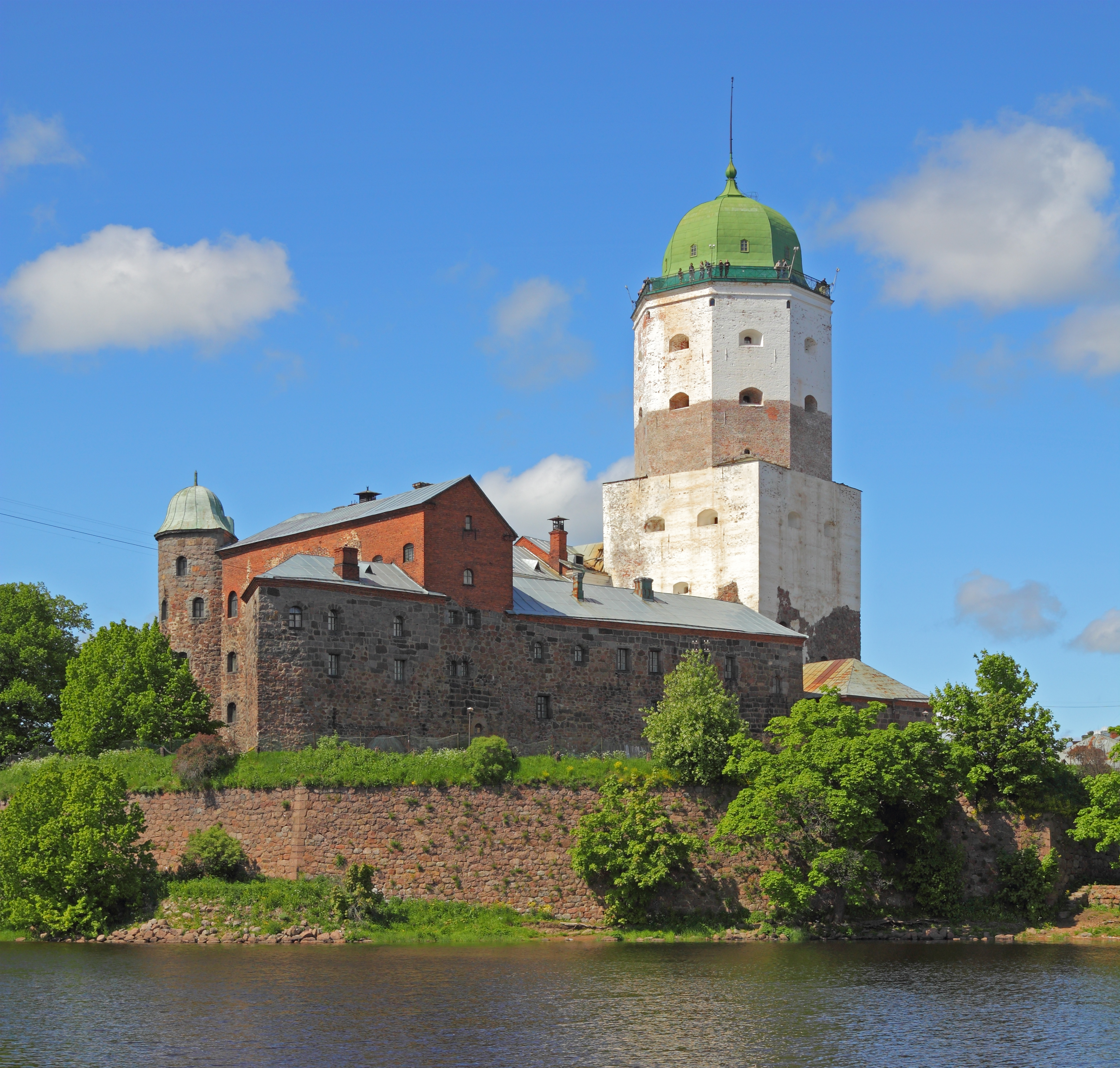
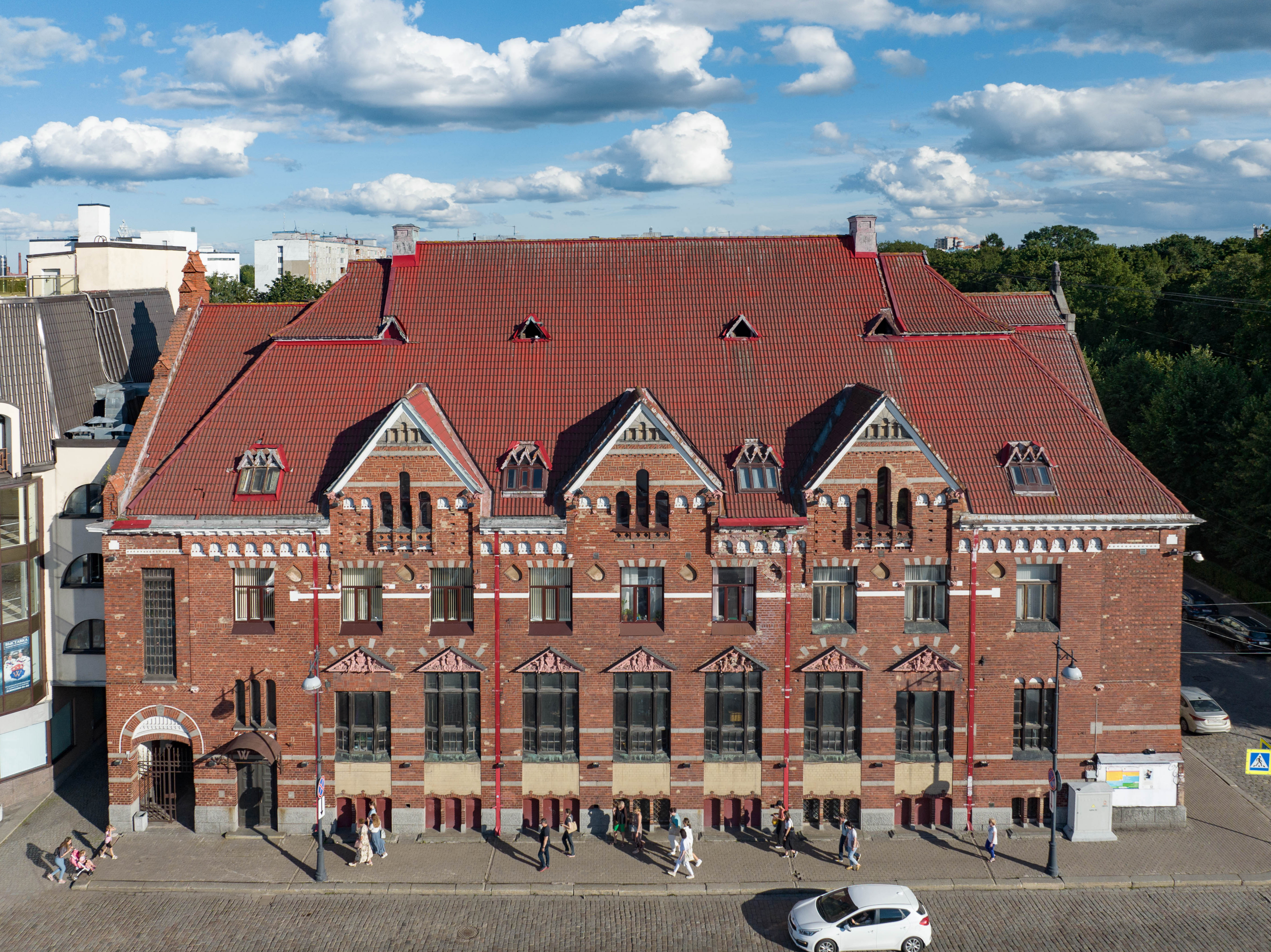
- Old Town Vyborg Castle Former Bank

- Flag Coat of arms
- Interactive map of Vyborg
- Location of Vyborg Vyborg (European Russia) Vyborg (Baltic Sea) Vyborg (Europe)
- Coordinates: 60°43′N 28°46′E
- Country: Russia
- Federal subject: Leningrad Oblast
- Administrative district: Vyborgsky District
- Settlement municipal formationSelsoviet: Vyborgskoye Settlement Municipal Formation
- Vyborg Castle constructed: 1293

Government
  - Body: Council of Deputies
  - Head: Gennady Orlov
- Elevation: 3 m (9.8 ft)

Population (2010 Census)
  - Total: 79,962
  - Estimate (2025): 70,443 (−11.9%)
  - Rank: 208th in 2010

Administrative status
  - Capital of: Vyborgsky District, Vyborgskoye Settlement Municipal Formation

Municipal status
  - Municipal district: Vyborgsky Municipal District
  - Urban settlement: Vyborgskoye Urban Settlement
  - Capital of: Vyborgsky Municipal District, Vyborgskoye Urban Settlement
- Time zone: UTC+3 (MSK)
- Postal codes: 188800–188802, 188804, 188805, 188807–188811, 188819, 188899
- Dialing code: +7 81378
- OKTMO ID: 41615101001
- Website: www.city.vbg.ru

Vyborg (Russian: Выборг, IPA: [ˈvɨbərk]; Finnish: Viipuri, IPA: [ˈʋiːpuri]; Swedish: Viborg, IPA: [ˈvǐːbɔrj], Finland Swedish pronunciation: [ˈviːborj]) is a town and the administrative center of Vyborgsky District in Leningrad Oblast, Russia. It lies on the Karelian Isthmus near the head of Vyborg Bay, 130 km (81 miles) northwest of St. Petersburg, 245 km (152 miles) east of the Finnish capital Helsinki, and 38 km (24 miles) south of Russia's border with Finland, where the Saimaa Canal enters the Gulf of Finland. The most recent census population of Vyborg is 72,530 (2021 census).

Vyborg was founded as a medieval fortress in Finland under Swedish rule during the Third Swedish Crusade. After numerous wars between the Russians and Swedes, the Treaty of Nöteborg in 1323 defined the border of eastern Finland, and would separate the two cultures. Vyborg remained under Swedish rule until it was captured by the Russians during the Great Northern War (1700–1721). Under Russian rule, Vyborg was the seat of Vyborg Governorate until it was incorporated into the newly established Grand Duchy of Finland, an autonomous part of the Russian Empire. Finland declared its independence from Russia in 1917, after which Vyborg became its second-most significant city after Helsinki, and represented internationally as its most multicultural city. During World War II, Vyborg's population was evacuated and the town was ceded to the Soviet Union. In 2010, Vyborg was conferred the status of "City of Military Glory" by Russian president Dmitry Medvedev.

The city hosts the Russian end of the 1,222 km (759 mi) Nord Stream 1 gas pipeline, laid in 2011 and operated by a consortium led by Russia's Gazprom state hydrocarbons enterprise to pump 55 billion cubic meters (1.9 trillion cubic feet) of natural gas a year under the Baltic Sea to Lubmin, Germany.

== Etymology ==
The Swedish name Viborg may be interpreted as 'holy fort'. It is derived from the words vi ('sacred', 'holy') and borg ('fortress', 'city'). The Finnish name Viipuri is an adaptation of the Swedish name.

== History ==
=== Early history ===
According to archeological research, the area of what is now Vyborg used to be a trading center on the Vuoksi River's western branch, which has since dried up. The region was inhabited by the Karelians, a Balto-Finnic tribe which gradually came under the domination of Novgorod and Sweden. It has been claimed that Vyborg appeared in the 11th–12th centuries as a mixed Karelian-Russian settlement, although there is no archeological proof of any East Slavic settlement of that time in the area, and it is not mentioned in any of the earliest historical documents, such as the Novgorod First Chronicle or the Primary Chronicle. Wider settlement in the area of Vyborg is generally regarded to date from 13th century onwards when Hanseatic traders began traveling to Novgorod.

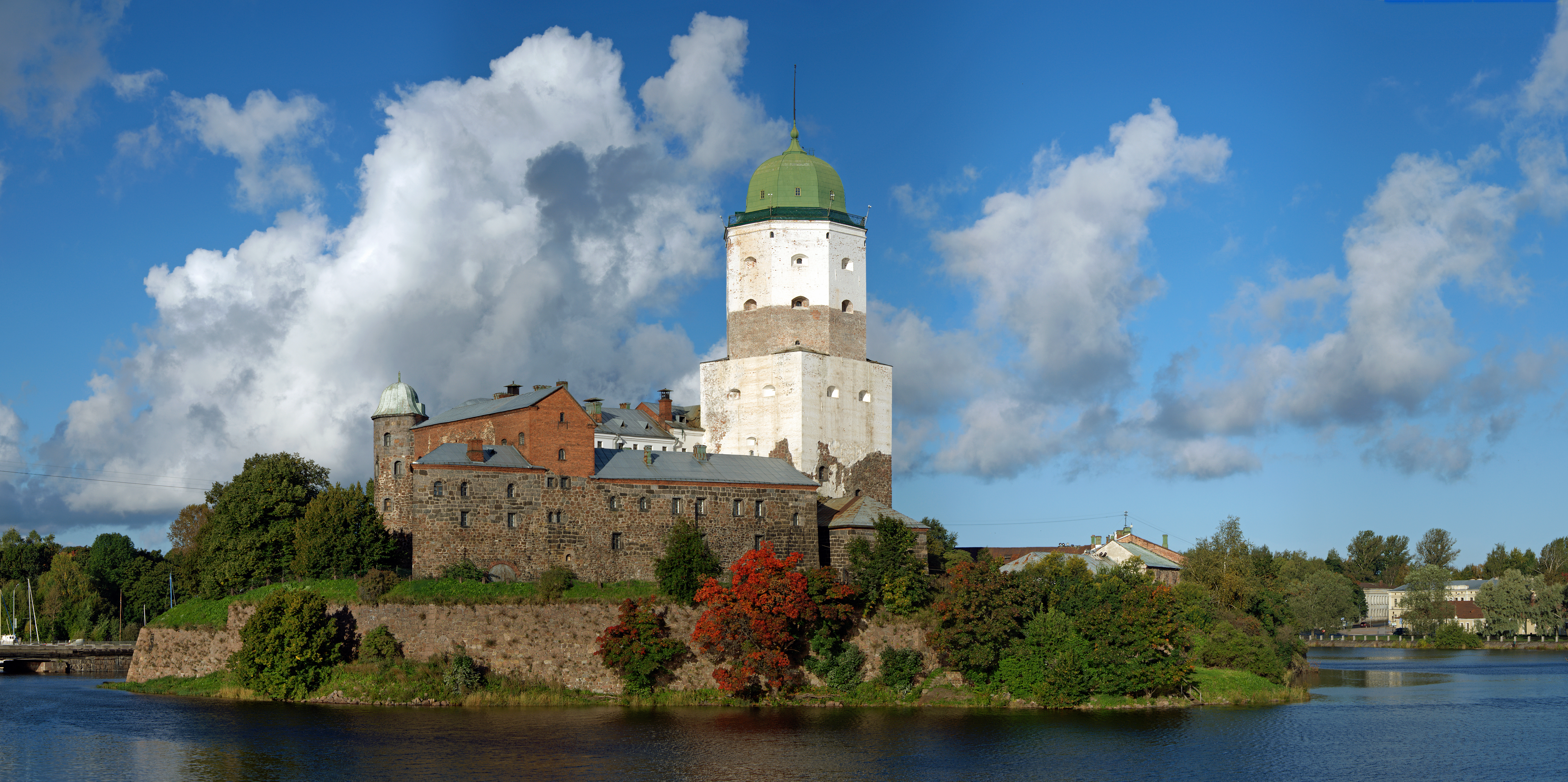
Vyborg Castle

Vyborg Castle was founded during the Third Swedish Crusade in 1293 by marsk Torkel Knutsson on the site of an older Karelian fort which was burned. The castle, which was the first centre for the spread of Christianity in Karelia, was fought over for decades between Sweden and the Republic of Novgorod. As a result of the Treaty of Nöteborg in 1323 between the Novgorod Republic and Sweden, Vyborg was finally recognized as a part of Sweden. The town's trade privileges were chartered by the Pan-Scandinavian King Eric of Pomerania in 1403. It withstood a prolonged siege by Daniil Shchenya during the Russo-Swedish War of 1496–1497.

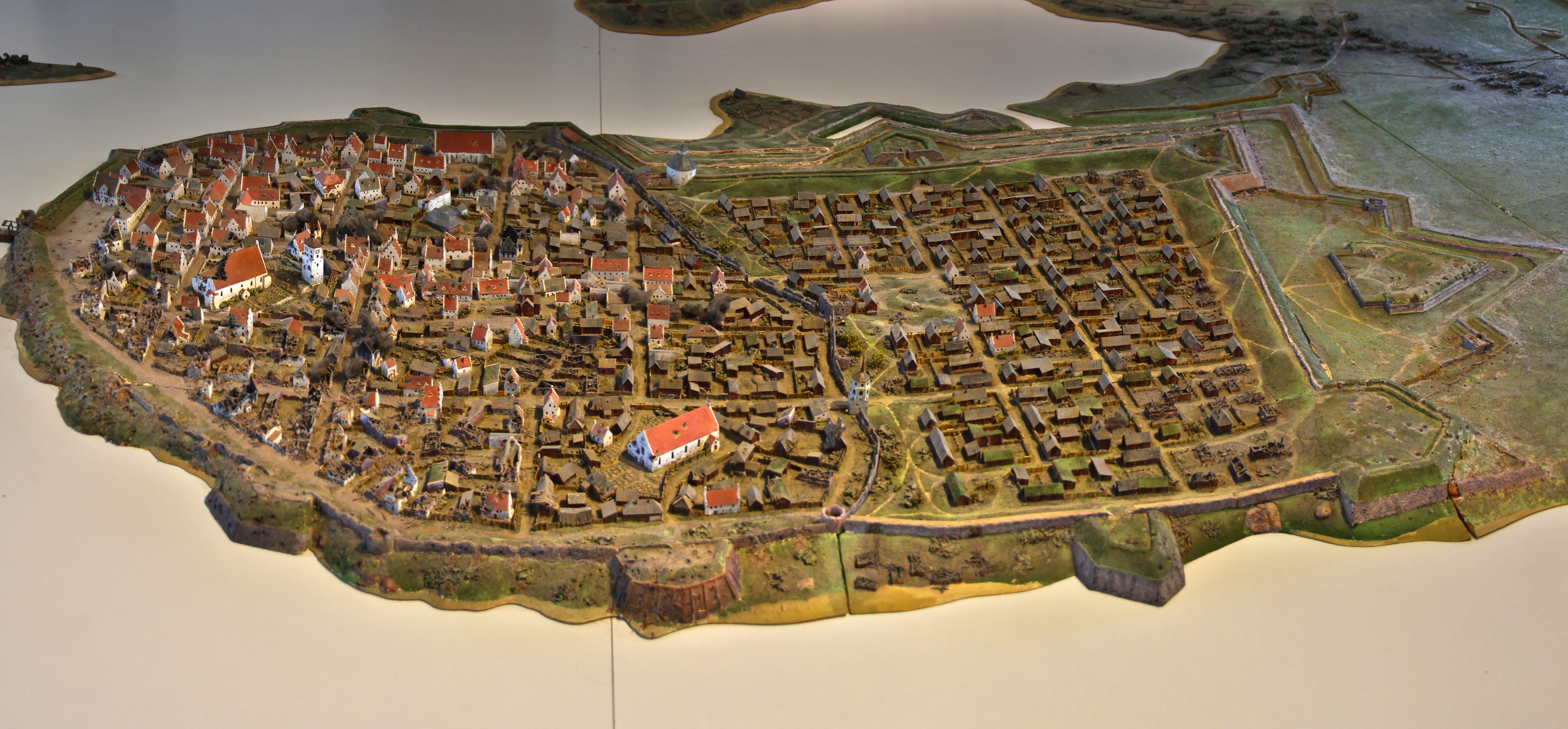
A model of Vyborg in the early 18th century

Under Swedish rule, Vyborg was closely associated with the noble family of Bååt, originally from Småland. The late-medieval commanders and fief holders of Vyborg were (almost always) descended from or married to the Bååt family. In practice, though not having this as their formal title, they functioned as Margraves, had feudal privileges, and kept all the crown's incomes from the fief to use for the defense of the realm's eastern border.

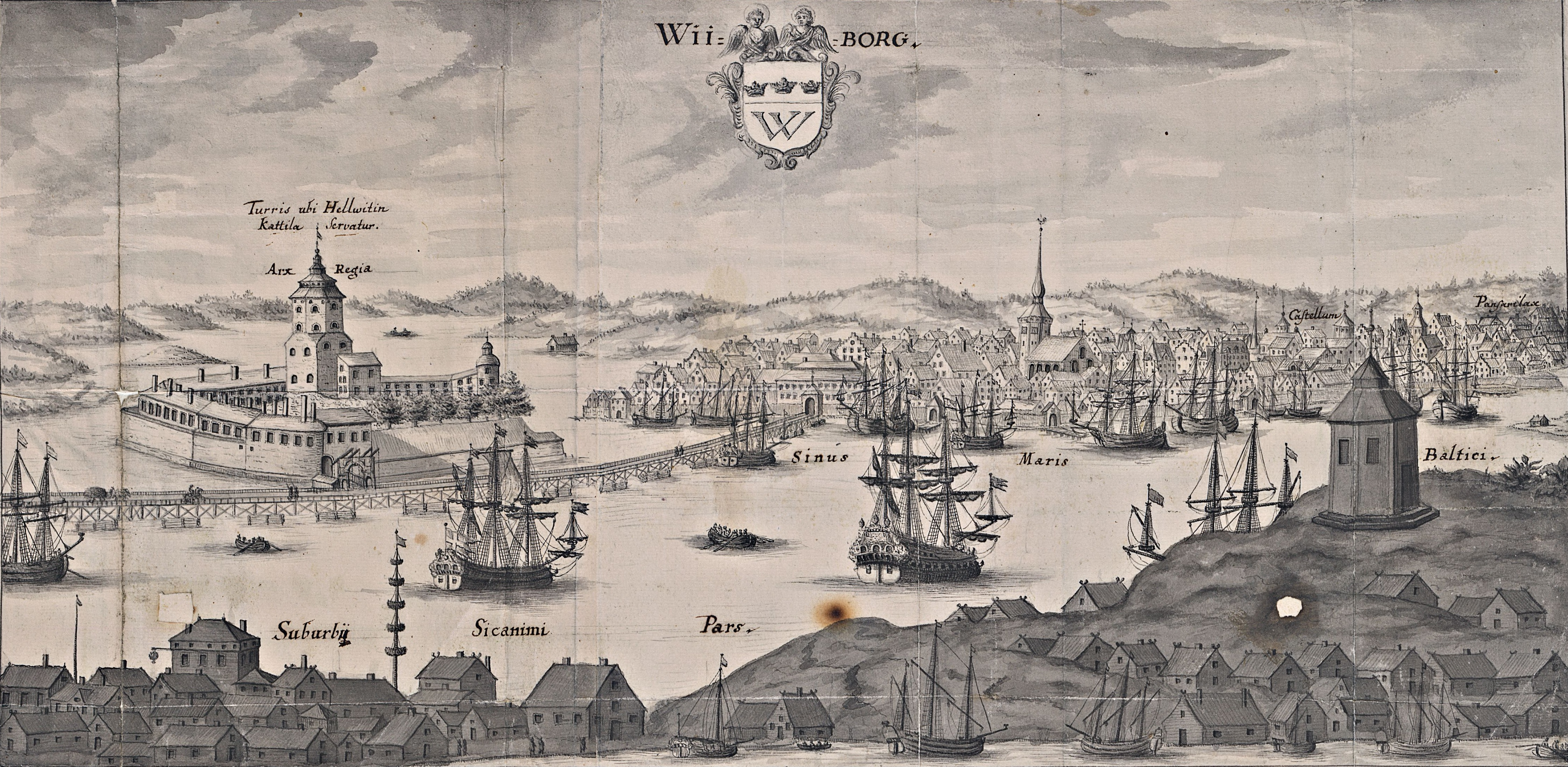
A copper engraving of Vyborg in 1709

=== Russian rule ===
Vyborg remained in Swedish hands until its capture in 1710 after the Siege of Vyborg by Tsar Peter the Great in the Great Northern War. In the course of Peter's second administrative reform, Vyborg became the seat of the Vyborg Province of St. Petersburg Governorate. The 1721 Treaty of Nystad, which concluded the war with Sweden, finalized the transfer of the town and a part of Old Finland to Russia. The loss of Vyborg led Sweden to develop Fredrikshamn as a substitute port town. Another result of the loss of Vyborg was that its diocese was moved to Borgå, transforming the town into an important learning centre.

In 1744, Vyborg became the seat of the Vyborg Governorate. In 1783, the governorate was transformed into the Vyborg Viceroyalty; in 1801, it reverted to Vyborg Governorate. In 1802, the Vyborg Governorate was renamed the Finland Governorate.

One of the largest naval battles in history, the Battle of Vyborg Bay, was fought in Vyborg Bay on 4 July 1790.

After the rest of Finland was ceded to Russia in 1809, Emperor Alexander I incorporated the town and the governorate into the newly created Grand Duchy of Finland in 1811 (1812 NS).

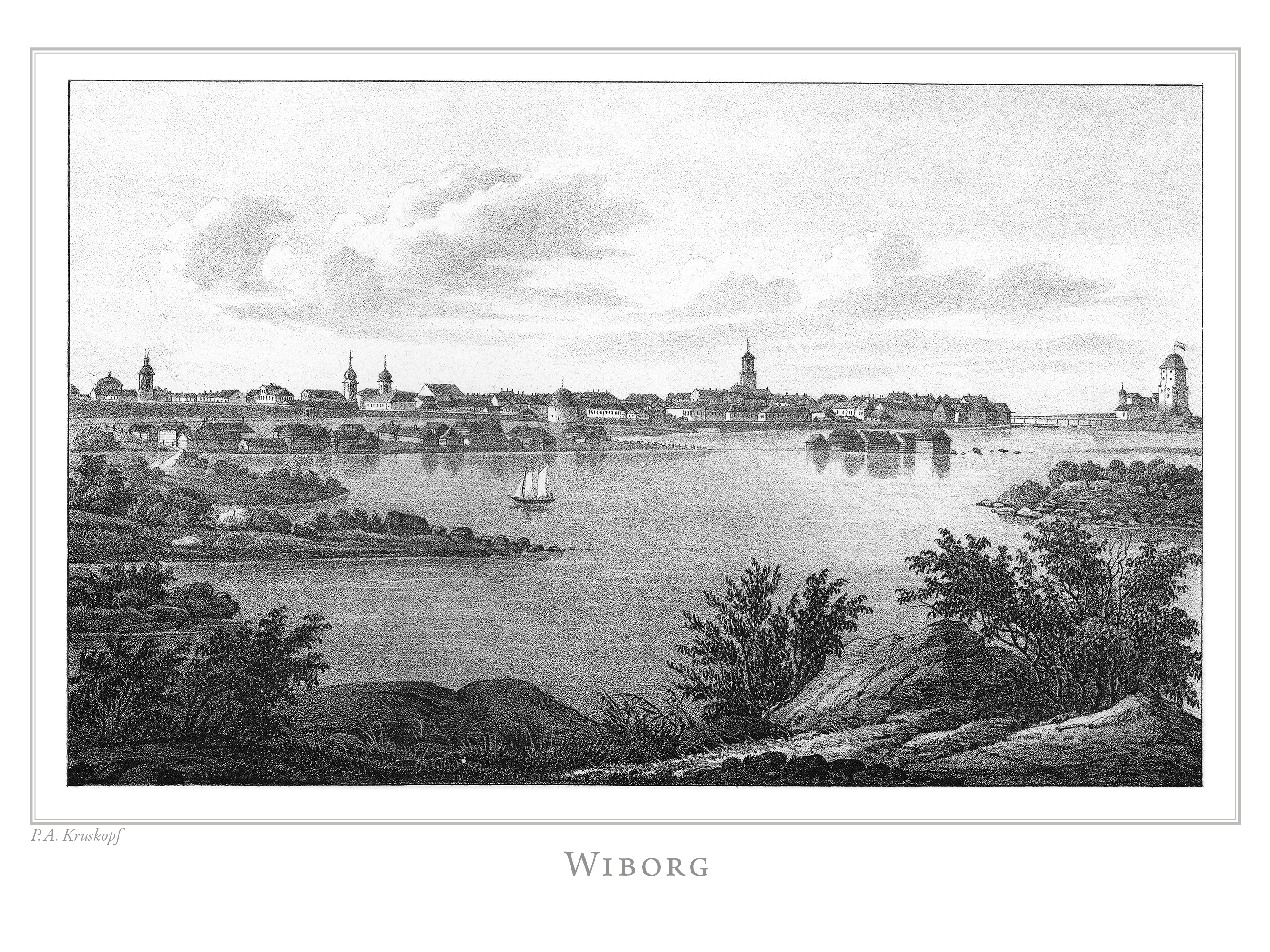
Illustration in Finland framstäldt i teckningar edited by Zacharias Topelius and published 1845–1852.

Over the course of the 19th century, the town developed as the centre of administration and trade for eastern Finland. The inauguration of the Saimaa Canal in 1856 benefited the local economy, as it opened the vast waterways of Eastern Finland to the sea. Vyborg was never a major industrial center and lacked large production facilities, but its location made it serve as a focal point of transports of all industries on the Karelian Isthmus, Ladoga Karelia and southeastern Finland. Trams in Vyborg started in 1912.

The Bolshevik revolutionary Vladimir Lenin lived in the town for a period between the February Revolution and October Revolution of 1917.

=== Finnish period ===
In June 1917, Viipuri hosted a convention of ethnic Polish military men stationed throughout Finland, at which it was decided to form the Polish Legion in Finland to fight for Finnish independence from Russia (see also Finland–Poland relations). The 1,700-strong Legion was then stationed in Viipuri. Following the Russian Revolution of 1917 and the fall of the Russian Empire, Finland declared itself independent. During the Finnish Civil War, Viipuri was in the hands of the Finnish Red Guards until it was captured by the White Guard in the Battle of Vyborg, on 29 April 1918. In April to May 1918, 360 to 420 civilians were murdered by White Guards during the Vyborg massacre. The city served as the starting point of the civil war, which later spread to the rest of Finland.

Vyborg served as the seat of Viipuri Province. In the 1930 census, the administrative area of the city of Vyborg had 52,253 inhabitants. There were a total of 19,986 inhabitants in the rural areas of Vyborg and in Uura, which was located outside the borders of Vyborg but was included in the census, and so the total population of the census area was 72,239. Of the total inhabitants in the census area, 67,609 spoke Finnish, 2,103 Swedish, 1,807 Russian and 439 German. In 1939, the population was slightly less than 75,000 and was Finland's second-largest (Population Register) or fourth-largest (Church and Civil Register) city, depending on the census data. Vyborg had sizable minorities of Swedes, Germans, Russians, Romani, Tatars and Jews. During that time, Alvar Aalto built the Vyborg Library, an icon of functionalist architecture.

==== Winter and Continuation Wars ====
During the Winter War between the Soviet Union and Finland in 1939–1940, over 70,000 people were evacuated from Vyborg to other parts of Finland. The Winter War was concluded by the Moscow Peace Treaty, which stipulated the transfer of Vyborg to Soviet control, and the whole Karelian Isthmus, and those places were emptied of their residents, to Soviet control. It was incorporated into the Karelo-Finnish Soviet Socialist Republic on 31 March 1940. As the town was still held by the Finns, the remaining Finnish population, some 10,000 people, had to be evacuated in haste before the handover. Thus, practically the whole population of Finnish Vyborg was resettled elsewhere in Finland. The town became the administrative center of Vyborgsky District.

The evacuees from Finnish Karelia came to be a vociferous political force, and their wish to return to their homes was an important motive when Finland sought support from Nazi Germany against the Soviet Union. As a result, Finland fought with Nazi Germany as a co-belligerent during the Second World War.

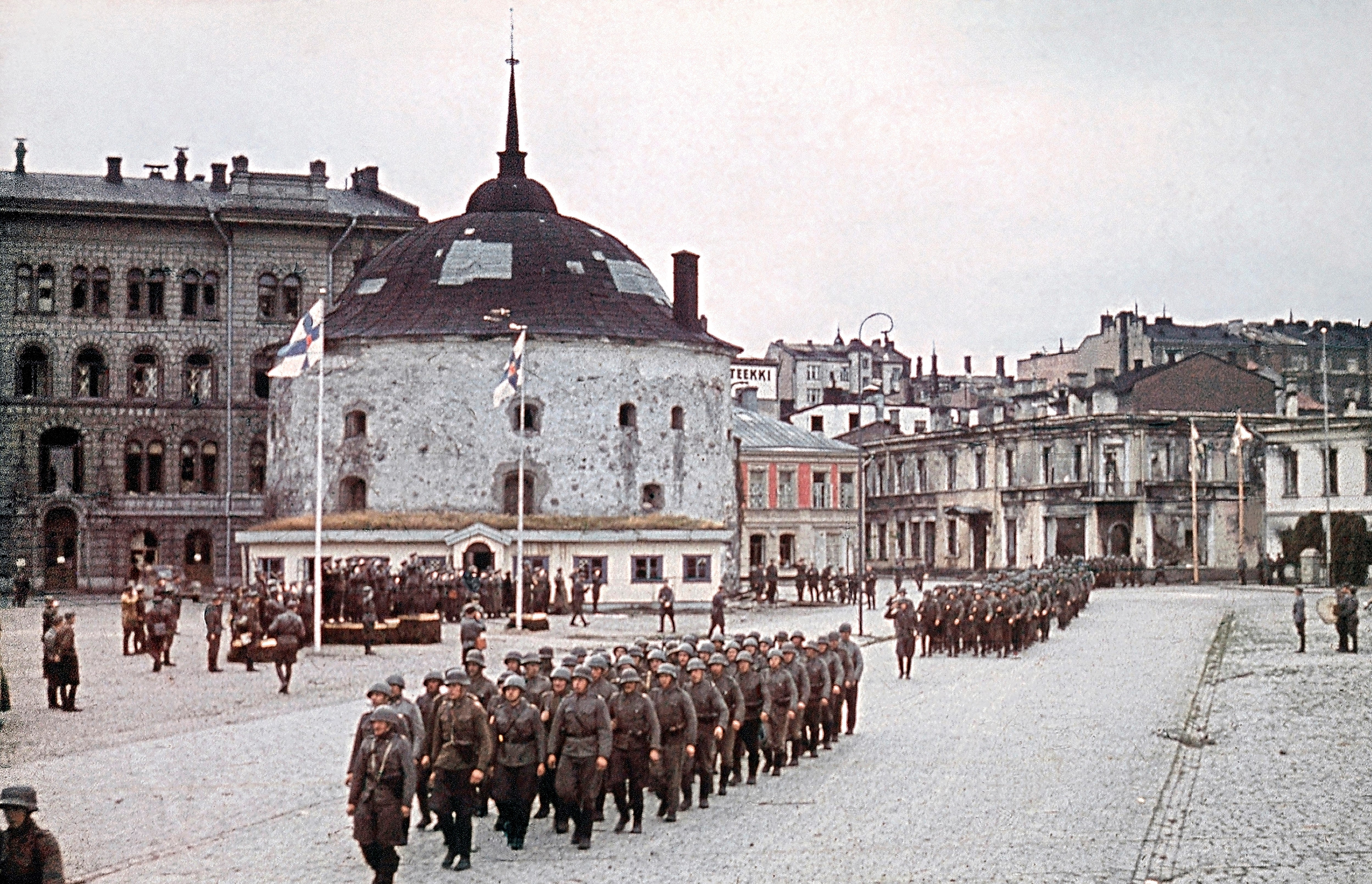
Finnish soldiers marching in Vyborg on 31 August 1941

On 29 August 1941, Vyborg was captured by Finnish troops. At first, the Finnish Army did not allow civilians into the town. Of the 6,287 buildings, 3,807 had been destroyed. The first civilians started to arrive in late September, and by the end of the year, Vyborg had a population of about 9,700. In December 1941, the Finnish government formally annexed the town, along with the other areas that had been lost in the Moscow Peace Treaty. By 1942, the population had risen to 16,000. About 70% of the evacuees from Finnish Karelia returned after the reconquest to rebuild their looted homes but were again evacuated after the Red Army's Vyborg–Petrozavodsk Offensive, timed to coincide with the Battle of Normandy. By the time of the Soviet offensive, the town had a population of nearly 28,000. The town was captured by the Red Army on 20 June 1944, but the Finnish forces, using war material provided by Germany, managed to halt the Soviet offensive at the Battle of Tali-Ihantala, the largest battle fought by any of the Nordic countries, in Viipuri Rural Municipality, which surrounded the town, during which the town was seriously damaged.

In the subsequent Moscow Armistice on 19 September 1944, Finland returned to the borders set by the Moscow Peace Treaty and ceded more land than the treaty originally demanded. In the Paris Peace Treaties (1947), Finland relinquished all claims to Vyborg.

=== Soviet era ===
After the Second World War, Leningrad Oblast wanted to incorporate the area of Vyborg, but it took until November 1944 for the area to be finally transferred from the Karelo-Finnish SSR. During the Soviet era, the town was settled by people from all over the Soviet Union. The naval air bases of Pribylovo and Veshchevo were built nearby.

In 1940s and the 1950s, new factories were built: shipbuilding (1948), instrumentational (1953). In 1960, a local history museum was opened.

== Administrative and municipal status ==
Vyborg's former Finnish coat of arms

Within the framework of administrative divisions, Vyborg serves as the administrative center of Vyborgsky District. As an administrative division, it is incorporated within Vyborgsky District as Vyborgskoye Settlement Municipal Formation. As a municipal division, Vyborgskoye Settlement Municipal Formation is incorporated within Vyborg Municipal District as Vyborgskoye Urban Settlement.

== Geography ==
The town lies on the Karelian Isthmus near the head of Vyborg Bay, 130 km (81 miles) northwest of St. Petersburg, 245 km (152 miles) east of the Finnish capital Helsinki, and 38 km (24 miles) south of Russia's border with Finland, where the Saimaa Canal enters the Gulf of Finland.

=== Climate ===
Similar to many other areas along the Baltic Sea, Vyborg has a humid continental climate (Dfb). The climate is characterised by a fairly cloudy beginning of winter, but an increasing share of sunshine from February. Winter temperatures are being somewhat moderated by maritime effects compared to Russian cities further inland even on more southerly latitudes, but still cold enough compared to areas that are nearer the Gulf Stream. The beginning of spring is generally sunny and rather low in precipitation. Summer is moderately warm. Autumn is generally cloudy and rainy. On average, daytime insolation on a horizontal surface is 2.79 kW/m^{2}. The most dominant are the south-west and south winds.

Climate data for Vyborg (1991–2020, extremes 1884–present)
Month	Jan	Feb	Mar	Apr	May	Jun	Jul	Aug	Sep	Oct	Nov	Dec	Year
Record high °C (°F)	6.9 (44.4)	8.4 (47.1)	13.8 (56.8)	22.1 (71.8)	30.0 (86.0)	32.9 (91.2)	34.6 (94.3)	33.4 (92.1)	27.4 (81.3)	19.1 (66.4)	12.9 (55.2)	8.6 (47.5)	34.6 (94.3)
Mean daily maximum °C (°F)	−3.4 (25.9)	−3.3 (26.1)	1.0 (33.8)	7.4 (45.3)	14.9 (58.8)	19.5 (67.1)	22.6 (72.7)	20.8 (69.4)	15.1 (59.2)	7.9 (46.2)	2.3 (36.1)	−1.0 (30.2)	8.7 (47.7)
Daily mean °C (°F)	−6.0 (21.2)	−6.3 (20.7)	−2.6 (27.3)	3.2 (37.8)	10.4 (50.7)	15.3 (59.5)	18.5 (65.3)	16.8 (62.2)	11.6 (52.9)	5.5 (41.9)	0.4 (32.7)	−3.2 (26.2)	5.3 (41.5)
Mean daily minimum °C (°F)	−8.8 (16.2)	−9.5 (14.9)	−6.1 (21.0)	−0.4 (31.3)	6.0 (42.8)	11.3 (52.3)	14.5 (58.1)	13.1 (55.6)	8.4 (47.1)	3.2 (37.8)	−1.5 (29.3)	−5.4 (22.3)	2.1 (35.8)
Record low °C (°F)	−36.8 (−34.2)	−35.4 (−31.7)	−29.1 (−20.4)	−20.9 (−5.6)	−5.0 (23.0)	0.1 (32.2)	5.8 (42.4)	2.0 (35.6)	−3.9 (25.0)	−11.4 (11.5)	−21.0 (−5.8)	−33.6 (−28.5)	−36.8 (−34.2)
Average precipitation mm (inches)	52 (2.0)	43 (1.7)	40 (1.6)	35 (1.4)	43 (1.7)	60 (2.4)	69 (2.7)	79 (3.1)	68 (2.7)	77 (3.0)	70 (2.8)	66 (2.6)	702 (27.6)
Average extreme snow depth cm (inches)	22 (8.7)	35 (14)	37 (15)	8 (3.1)	0 (0)	0 (0)	0 (0)	0 (0)	0 (0)	0 (0)	3 (1.2)	11 (4.3)	37 (15)
Average rainy days	6	5	7	10	14	16	15	16	18	18	13	8	146
Average snowy days	22	20	16	7	1	0.1	0	0	0.1	4	14	20	104
Average relative humidity (%)	87	85	82	74	68	71	73	77	82	86	88	89	80
Source: Pogoda.ru.net

== Demographics ==
Historical population

Year	Pop.	±%
1897	23,500	—
1939	74,403	+216.6%
1959	51,088	−31.3%
1970	65,188	+27.6%
1979	75,573	+15.9%

Year	Pop.	±%
1989	80,924	+7.1%
2002	79,224	−2.1%
2010	79,962	+0.9%
2021	72,530	−9.3%

Source: Censuses

== Economy and culture ==
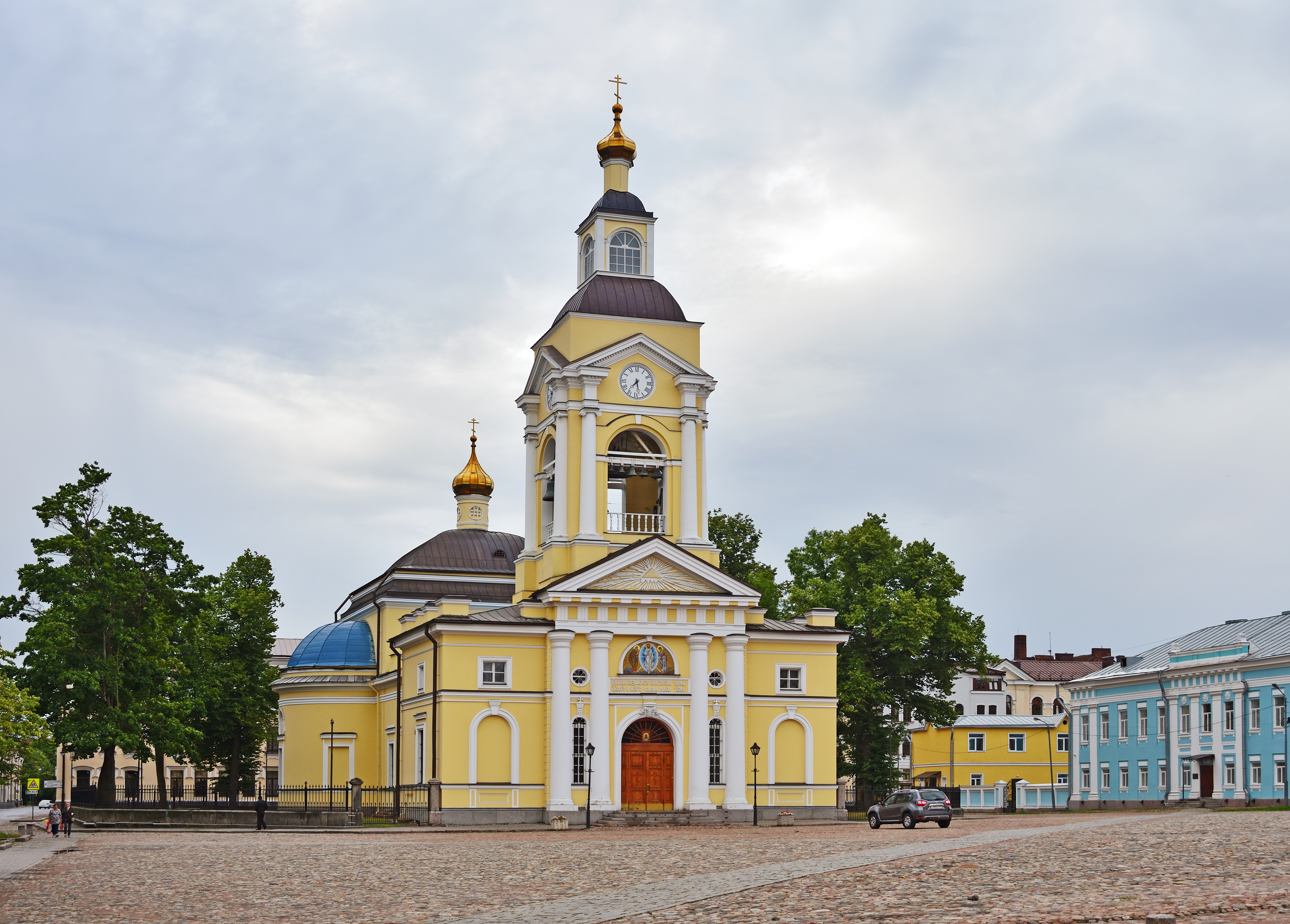
Transfiguration Cathedral

Vyborg is an important industrial producer of paper. It is home to the Vyborg Shipyard.

An HVDC back-to-back facility for the exchange of electricity between the Russian and Finnish power grids was completed near Vyborg in 1982. It consists of three bipolar HVDC back-to-back schemes with an operating voltage of 85 kV and a maximum transmission rate of 355 MW. The entire maximum transmission rate amounts to 1,420 MW.

The Nord Stream 1 offshore pipeline runs from Vyborg compressor station at Portovaya Bay along the bottom of the Baltic Sea to Lubmin in Germany. It started operating in September 2011, enabling Russia to export gas directly to Western Europe. The feeding pipeline in Russia (Gryazovets–Vyborg gas pipeline) is operated by Gazprom and is a part of the integrated gas transport network of Russia connecting existing grid in Gryazovets with the coastal compressor station at Vyborg.

=== Finnish singing culture ===
Before World War II, Vyborg was a major Finnish town of culture. Today, a few choirs cherish Vyborg singing traditions. These are, for example, the Wiipurilaisen osakunnan kuoro of the University of Helsinki and the Viipurin Lauluveikot male choir, with the latter founded in Vyborg in 1897.

== Local government ==
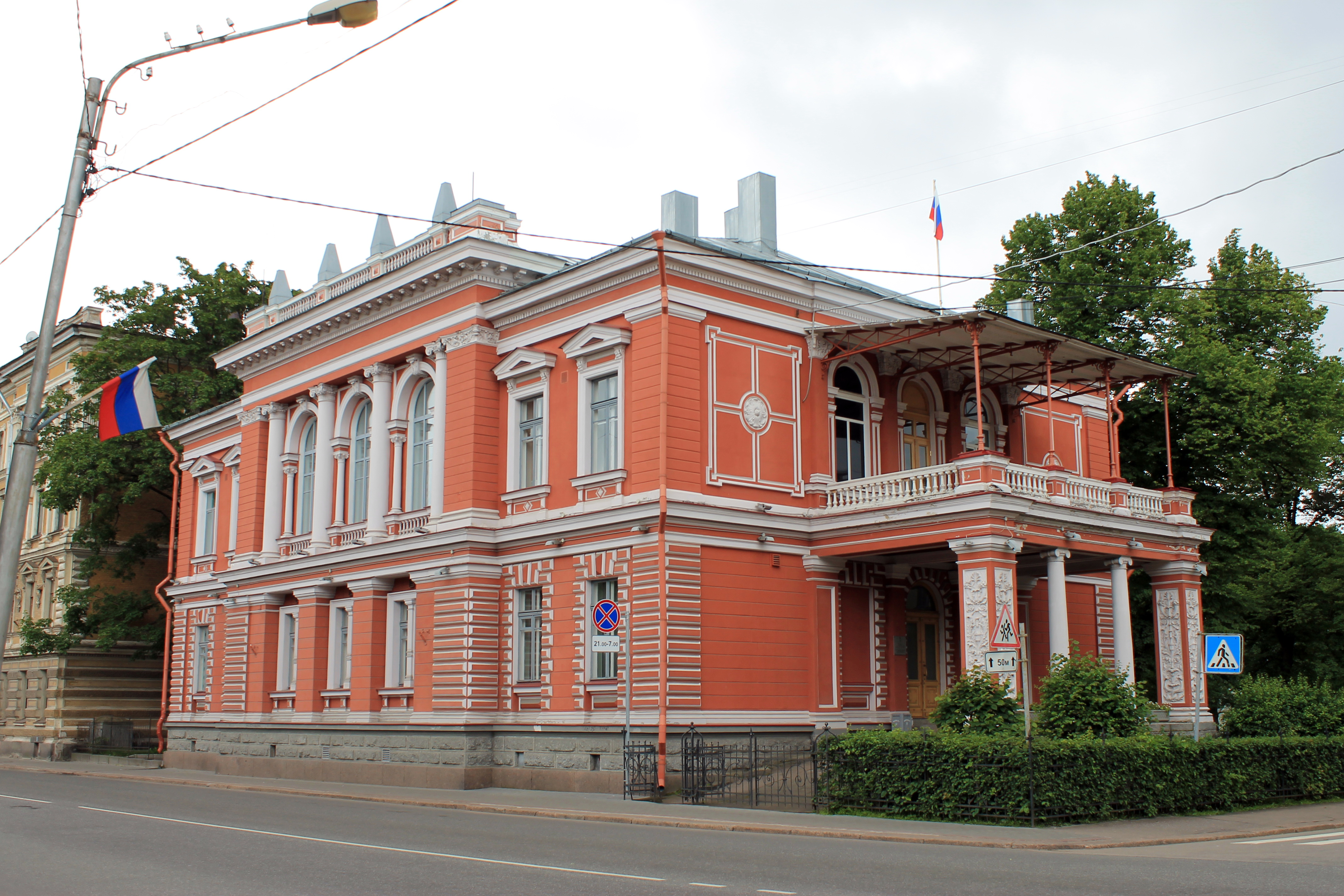
City Council of Deputies building

Vyborg is a municipal entity within the Vyborgsky District of the Leningrad Oblast. Its official name is the municipal formation "City of Vyborg" of the Vyborg district of the Leningrad region; the abbreviated name is the municipal entity "City of Vyborg".

Local self-government is carried out on the basis of the charter, which was adopted by the decision of the Council of Deputies of Vyborg dated 16 June 2010 No. 63.

The representative body of local self-government is the Council of Deputies, consisting of 20 deputies elected in municipal elections in single-member constituencies for a period of five years. Per the results of the elections on 11 October 2009, all 20 seats were occupied by members of the United Russia party. The Council of Deputies is headed by the head of the municipality, who is elected by deputies from among its members, also for a period of five years. On 20 October 2009, Gennady Alekseyevich Orlov was elected as head of the municipality. Since September 2014, the position of head of the Vyborg District Municipal District of the Leningrad Oblast has been occupied by Alexander Petrovich Lysov. Also in September 2014, Gennady Alekseyevich Orlov assumed the position of head of the administration of the municipal formation "Vyborg District" of the Leningrad Oblast.

The executive and administrative body of local self-government is the administration. It is formed and headed by the head of the administration, who is appointed under a contract concluded based on the results of a competition for a period of five years. From 2 August 2011, the head of the administration was Alexander Aleksandrovich Buyanov. On 24 September 2014, the post of head of the Municipal Municipality "City of Vyborg" was taken by Alexander Petrovich Lysov. His candidacy was supported unanimously.

== Sights ==
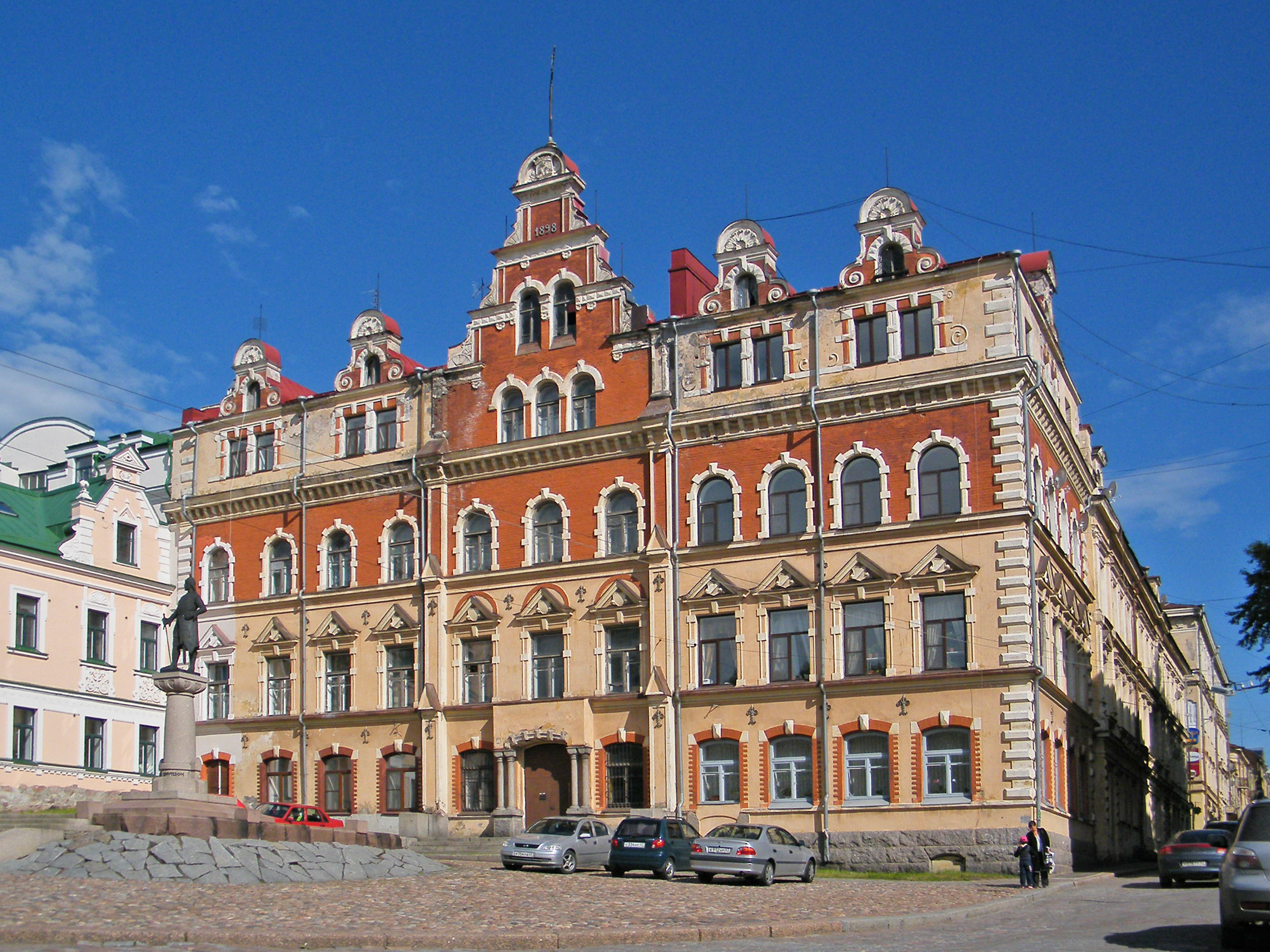
Old Town Hall and Torkel Knutsson Monument

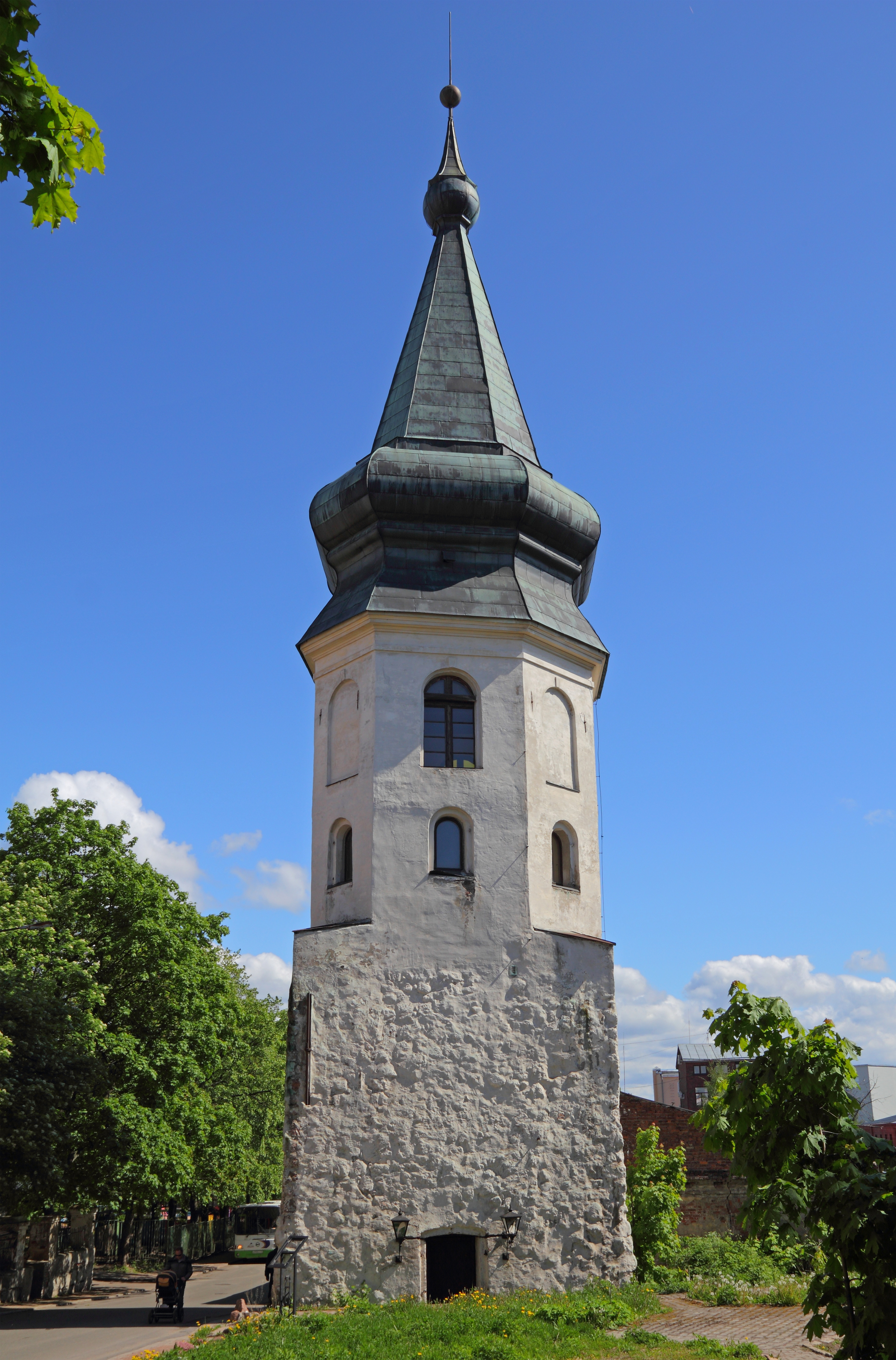
Town Hall Tower (c. 1500)

Vyborg's most prominent landmark is its Swedish-built castle, founded in the 13th century and extensively reconstructed in 1891–1894. The Round Tower and the Rathaus Tower date from the mid-16th century and are parts of the medieval Vyborg town wall. Many of the buildings in the historic old town of Vyborg are still in poor condition today.

The Viipuri Library by Finnish architect Alvar Aalto and the Hermitage-Vyborg Center are a reference point in the history of modern architecture. There are also Russian fortifications of Annenkrone, completed by 1740, as well as the monuments to Peter the Great (1910) and Torkel Knutsson. Tourists can also visit the house where the founder of the Soviet state Vladimir Lenin prepared the Bolshevik revolution during his stay in Vyborg from 24 September to 7 October 1917. The main street in Vyborg is called Prospekt Lenina (Russian: проспект Ленина; literally "Lenin Avenue"), formerly also known as Torkkelinkatu, and along it, there is the popular Lenin Park.

Sprawling along the heights adjacent to the Gulf of Finland is Monrepos Park, one of the most spacious English landscape gardens in Eastern Europe. The garden was laid out on behest of its owner, Baron Ludwig Heinrich von Nicolay, at the turn of the 19th century. Most of its structures were designed by the architect Giuseppe Antonio Martinelli. Previously, the estate belonged to the future king Frederick I (Maria Fyodorovna's brother), who called it Charlottendahl in honor of his second wife.

== Notable people ==
=== Born 1917–1945 ===
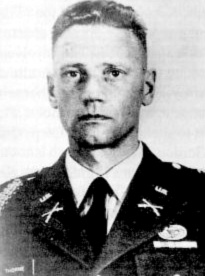
Larry Thorne, 1960s

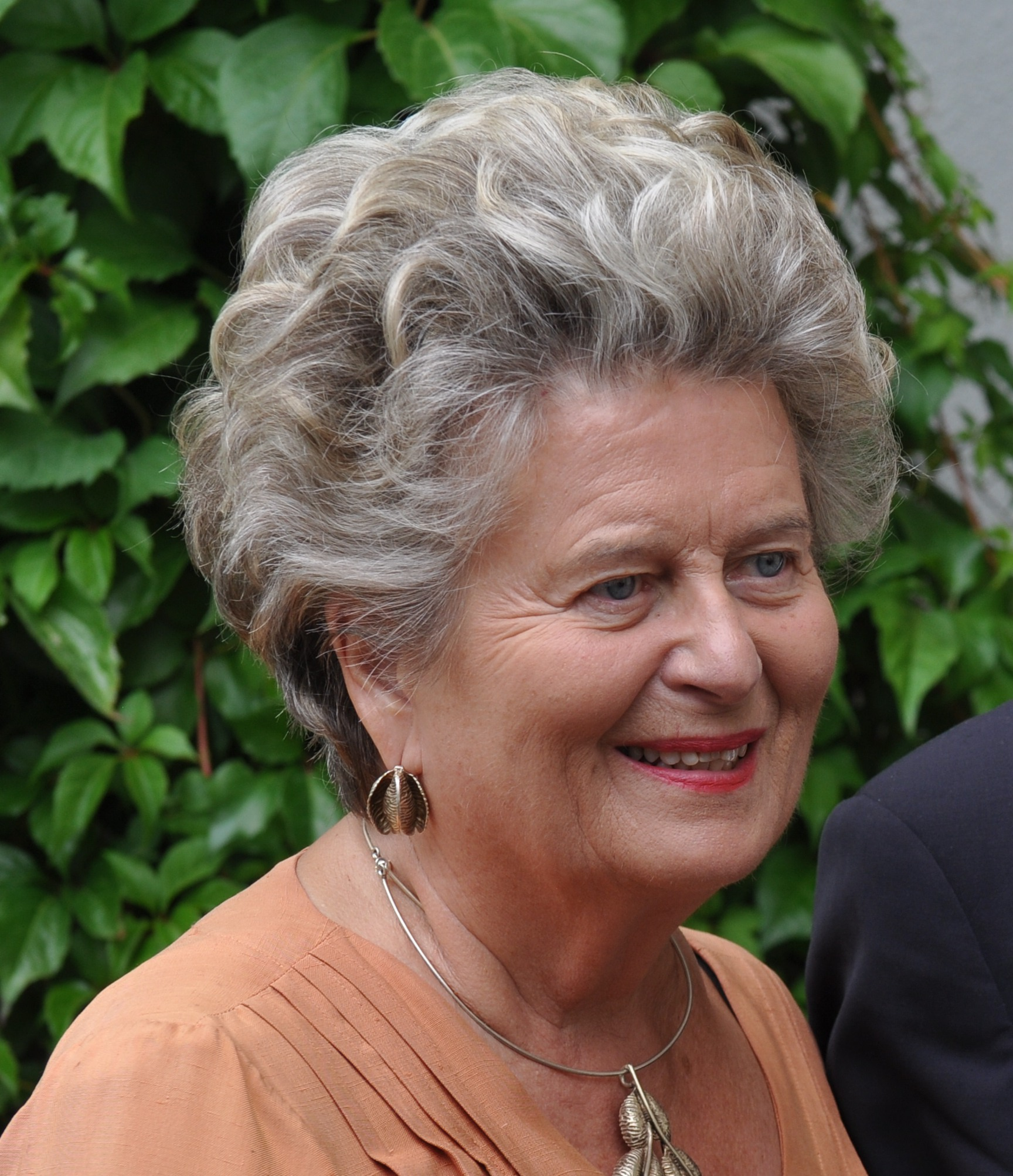
Riitta Uosukainen, 2013

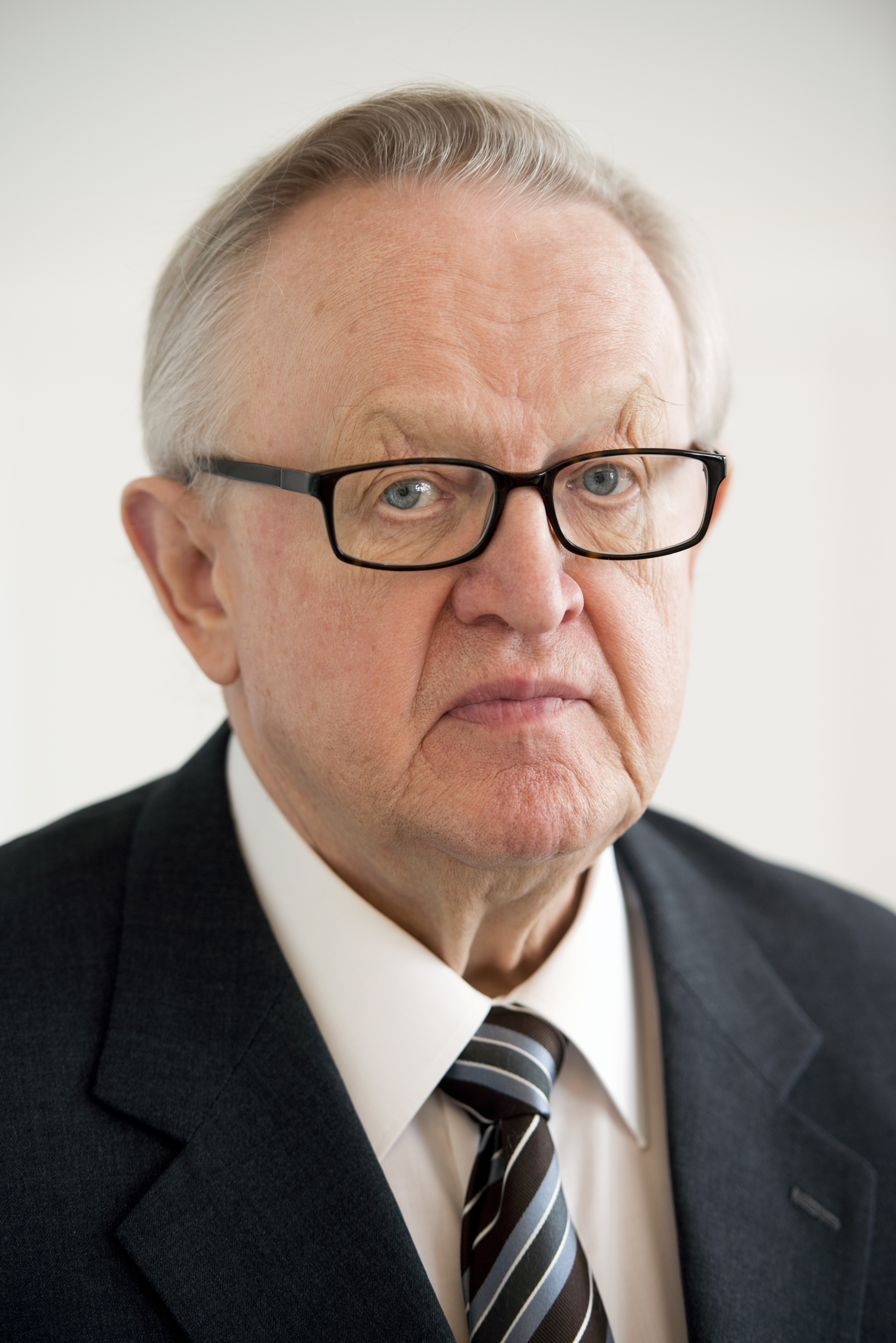
Martti Ahtisaari, 2012

- Lauri Törni (a.k.a. Larry Thorne; 1919–1965), Finnish Army captain who later served in the German and United States armies
- Sirkka Sari (1920 in Raivola – 1939), Finnish actress
- Lars Lindeman (1920–2006), Finnish politician and ambassador in Oslo, Reykjavik, and Lisbon
- Pekka Malinen (1921–2004), minister and diplomat, ambassador in Egypt, Syria, and Portugal
- Paul Jyrkänkallio (1922 in Koivisto – 2004), Finnish diplomat, ambassador in Sofia, Rome, and Athens
- Usko Santavuori (1922–2003), Finnish sensationalist radio reporter
- Max Jakobson (1923–2013), Finnish diplomat and journalist of Finnish-Jewish descent
- Tankmar Horn (1924–2018), Finnish diplomat, economist and businessman
- Heimo Haitto (1925–1999), Finnish-American classical violinist and child prodigy
- Juhani Kumpulainen (1925–1991), Finnish actor and director
- Seppo Pietinen (1925–1990), Finnish diplomat, Ambassador in Addis Ababa, Lima, Vienna, and Paris
- Irina Hudova (1926–2015), Finnish ballet dancer and teacher
- Ilmi Parkkari (1926–1979), Finnish film and stage actress
- Erik Bruun (born 1926), Finnish graphic designer
- Ossi Runne (1927–2020), Finnish musician
- Heikki Seppä (1927 in Säkkijärvi – 2010), Finnish-American master metalsmith, educator and author
- Veijo Meri (1928–2015), Finnish writer; his work focuses on war and its absurdity.
- Casper Wrede (1929–1998), Finnish theatre and film director
- Esko Kunnamo (1929–2014), Finnish diplomat, ambassador in Kuwait, Abu Dhabi, and Lagos
- Paavo Rintala (1930–1999), Finnish novelist and theologian
- Pertti Ripatti (1930–2016), Finnish diplomat, ambassador in Abu Dhabi, Caracas, and Kuala Lumpur
- Oiva Toikka (1931–2019), Finnish glass designer
- Lasse Äikäs (1932 in Kuolemajärvi – 1988), Finnish lawyer, civil servant and politician
- Kari Nurmela (1933–1984), Finnish dramatic baritone
- Pertti Kärkkäinen (1933–2017), Finnish diplomat, Ambassador to Buenos Aires, Santiago, and Lima
- Pentti Ikonen (1934–2007), Finnish swimmer. He competed in 3 events at the 1952 Summer Olympics.
- Martti Ahtisaari (1937–2023), Finnish politician, the tenth President of Finland (1994–2000) and Nobel Peace Prize laureate
- Ari Siiriäinen (1939–2004), Finnish archaeologist who worked as the Professor of Archaeology in University of Helsinki from 1983 to 2004.
- Gustav Hägglund (born 1938), retired Finnish general, Chief of Defence 1994–2001
- Laila Hirvisaari (1938–2021), Finnish author and writer
- Heikki Talvitie (born 1939), Finnish diplomat, Ambassador in Belgrade, Moscow, and Stockholm
- Riitta Uosukainen (born 1942 in Jääski), Finnish politician and former MP, Counselor of State

=== Born after 1945 ===
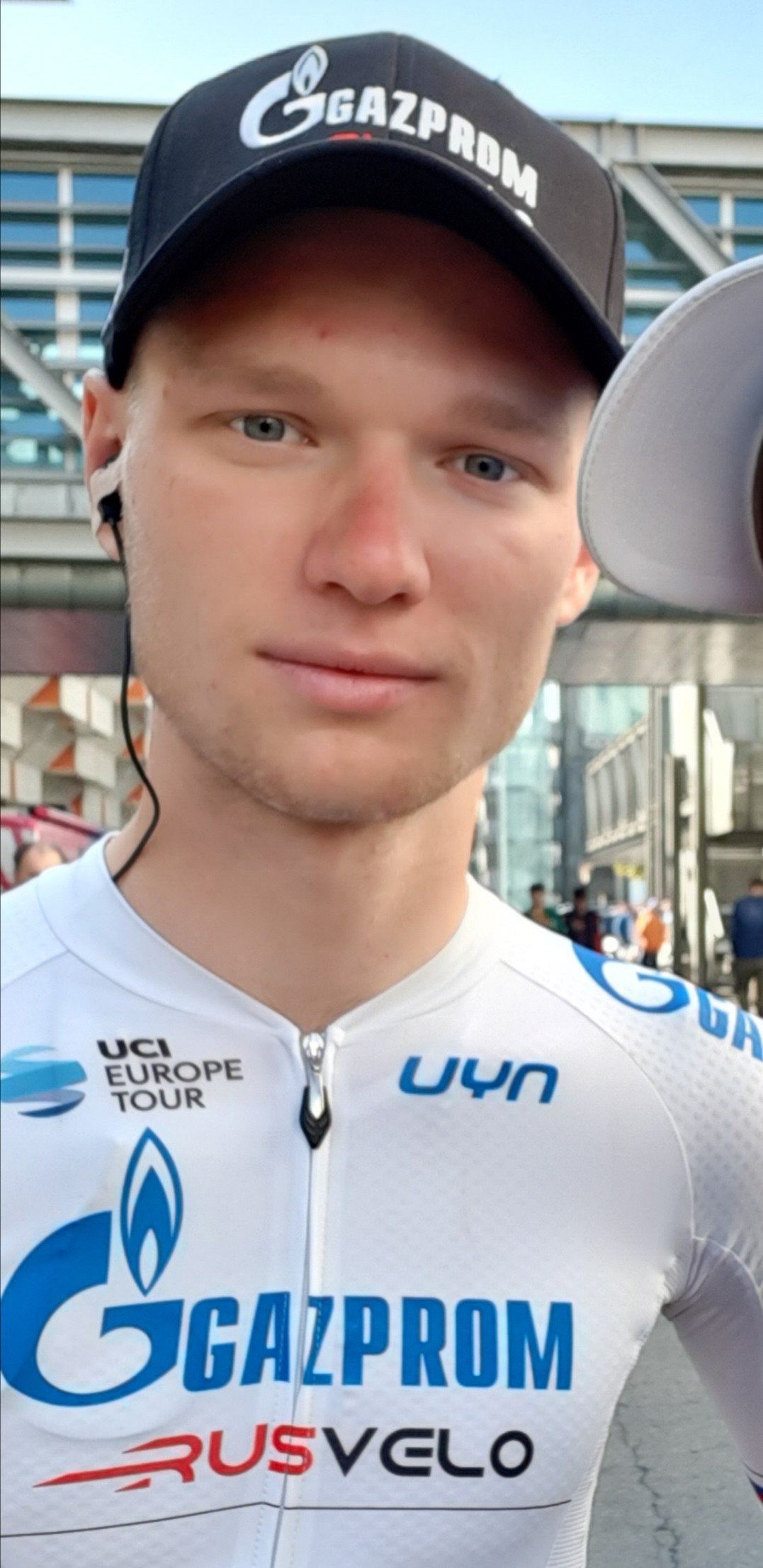
Aleksandr Vlasov, 2019

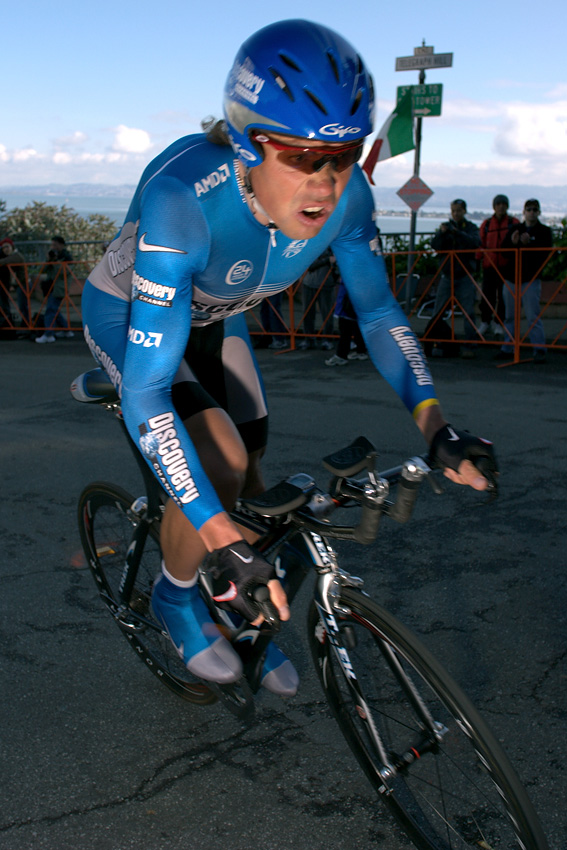
Viatcheslav Ekimov, 2006

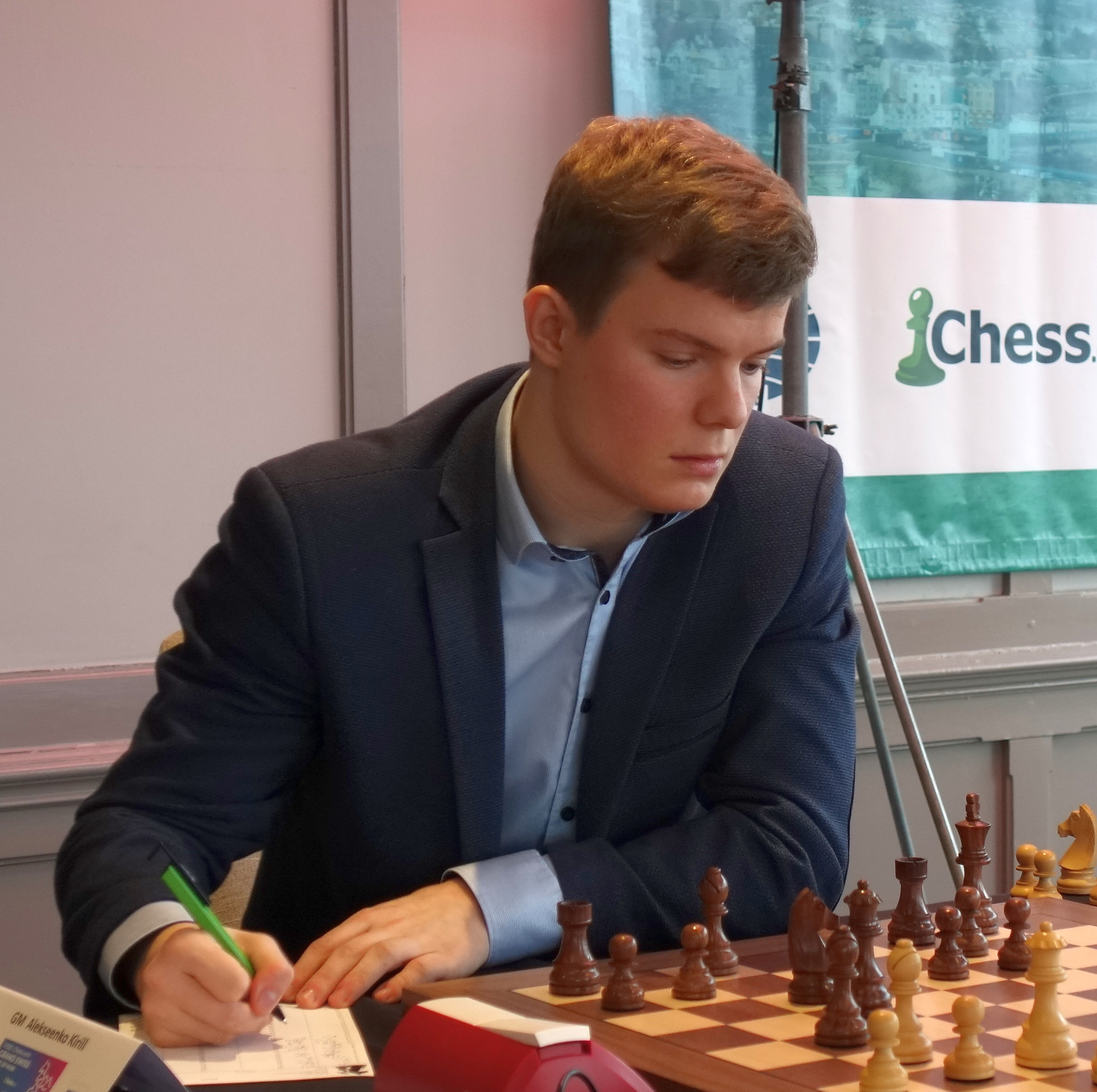
Kirill Alekseenko, 2019

- Negmatullo Kurbanov (born 1963), Tajik major general in the Ministry of Internal Affairs (Tajikistan)
- Viatcheslav Ekimov (born 1966), nicknamed Eki, Russian former professional racing cyclist and triple Olympic gold medalist
- Aleksandr Vlasov (born 1996), professional cyclist. He currently rides for Team Red Bull-Bora-Hansgrohe.
- Aleksey Tumakov (born 1983), paralympic footballer. Paralympic champion (2012), three-time world champion (2007, 2011, 2015)
- Vitaly Petrov (born 1984), Russian racing driver who competed in Formula One from 2010 to 2012
- Aleksei Kangaskolkka (born 1988), Russian-born Finnish footballer, who plays for Finnish side IFK Mariehamn
- Kirill Alekseenko (born 1997), Russian chess grandmaster, participant in the Candidates Tournament 2020
- Roman Ermakov (born 2004), Russian-Slovenian cyclist. Slovenian road cycling champion (2026). He currently rides for Team Bahrain Victorious.
- Miron Lifintsev (born 2006), Russian swimmer. A 5-time world champion in short course (2024).

== Twin towns and sister cities ==
Vyborg is twinned with:

- Bodø, Norway
- Lappeenranta, Finland
- Ramla, Israel
- (United Kingdom) Stirling, Scotland

== See also ==
- European route E18
- Saimaa Canal
- Vyborg railway station
- The Devil's Church (чёртова церковь)
