= Irena (name) =

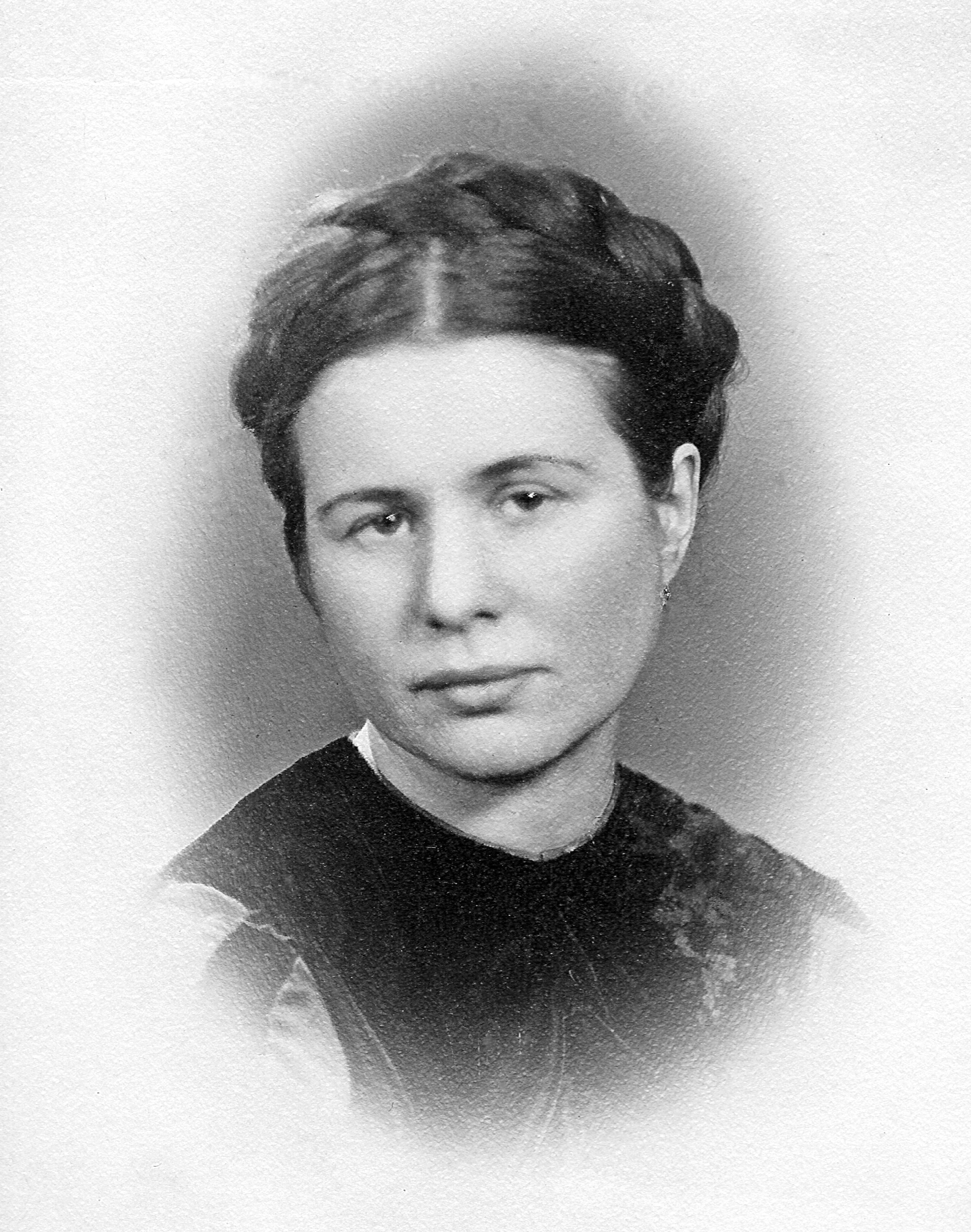
- Irena Sendler, Polish social worker and Holocaust rescuer in 1942.
- Gender: Female

Origin
- Region of origin: Europe

Other names
- Related names: Arina, Iren, Irene, Irina, Rina

Irena is a traditionally European feminine given name.

- Irena Adamowicz (1910–1973), Polish resistance member during World War II given the honor Righteous Among the Nations by Yad Vashem
- Irena Andriukaitienė (born 1948), Lithuanian politician
- Irena Bačiulytė (1939–2024), Lithuanian rower
- Irena Bauman, British architect
- Irena Belohorská (born 1948), Slovak politician
- Irena Białówna, Polish physician
- Irena Bihariová (born 1980), Slovak politician
- Irena Bjelica (born 1994), Montenegrin footballer
- Irena Boclincă, Moldovan theater actress
- Irena Borecká (born 1980), Czech basketball player
- Irena Borowik, Polish publisher
- Irena Brynner (1917–2003), Russian-born American sculptor, jewelry designer, author
- Irena Česneková (born 1972), Czech biathlete
- Irena Creed, Canadian hydrologist
- Irena Degutienė (born 1949), Lithuanian politician and twice acting Prime Minister
- Irena Dousková (born 1964), Czech writer and poet
- Irena Dubiska (1899–1990), Polish violinist
- Irena Dworakowska, Polish entomologist
- Irena Eichlerówna (1908–1990), Polish actress
- Irena Eris (born 1950), Polish physician
- Irena Fleissnerová (born 1958), Czech swimmer
- Irena Gillarová (born 1992), Czech javelin thrower
- Irena Górska-Damięcka (1910–2008), Polish actress and director
- Irena Grafenauer (born 1957), Slovenian classical flautist
- Irena Grudzińska-Gross (born 1946), Polish historian
- Irena Hajnsek (born 1970), professor of Earth observation and remote sensing
- Irena Hausmanowa-Petrusewicz (1917–2015), Polish doctor and neurologist
- Irena Homola-Skąpska (1929–2017), Polish historian
- Irena Iłłakowicz (1906–1943), Polish second lieutenant of the National Armed Forces and intelligence agent
- Irena Jarocka (1946–2012), Polish singer
- Irena Vodopivec Jean, Slovenian economist and banker
- Irena Joveva (born 1989), Slovenian politician
- Irena Justine (1993–2016), Indonesian actress
- Irena Jůzová (born 1965), Czech sculptor
- Irena Káňová (1893–1963), Slovak politician
- Irena Karpa (born 1980), Ukrainian writer, journalist and singer
- Irena Kazazić (born 1972), Slovenian painter and writer
- Irena Kempówna (1920–2002), Polish aviator
- Irena Khubulova (born 2001), Russian judoka
- Irena Klepfisz (born 1941), Polish-American author and activist
- Irena Kohont (born 1941), Slovenian singer
- Irena Koprowska (1917–2012), Polish pathologist
- Irena Kosíková, Czech organist and composer
- Irena Kosmowska (1879–1945), Polish educator and politician
- Irena Krzywicka (1899–1994), Polish feminist
- Irena Kuznetsov (born 2002), Israeli footballer
- Irena Kwiatkowska (1912–2011), Polish actress
- Irena Lasiecka (born 1948), Polish-American mathematician
- Irena Laskowska (1925–2019), Polish actress
- Irena Lasota (born 1945), Polish philosopher
- Irena Latinik-Vetulani (1904–1975), Polish biologist
- Irena Lichnerowicz-Augustyn (born 1974), Polish diplomat
- Irena Machovcak (born 1968), Dutch volleyball player
- Irena Majcen, Slovenian agricultural engineer
- Irena Malkiewicz (1911–2004), Polish actress
- Irena Martínková (born 1986), Czech footballer
- Irena Matović (born 1988), Montenegrin basketball player
- Irena Medavoy (born 1958), American actress
- Irena Milnikiel (1933–1989), Polish swimmer
- Irena Nalepa (born 1951), Polish neuroscientist
- Irena Nawrocka (1917–2008), Polish fencer
- Irena Netto (1899–1992), Polish actress
- Irena Olevsky (born 1974), Australian synchronized swimmer
- Irena Ondrová (1949–2021), Czech politician
- Irena Ossola (born 1988), American cyclist
- Irena Oženko (born 1962), Lithuanian former long jumper
- Irena Pantelic (born 1981), Dutch model
- Irena Pavelková (born 1974), Czech slalom canoer
- Irena Pavlovic (born 1988), French tennis player
- Irena Pawełczyk (born 1934), Polish luger
- Irena Peeva, American mathematician
- Irena Perminienė, Lithuanian former Paralympic athlete
- Irena Petkova, Bulgarian opera singer
- Irena Pfeiffer (1912–1996), Polish composer, conductor and teacher
- Irena Ponaroshku (born 1982), Russian TV host, journalist and blogger
- Irena Popiel (1925–2010), Polish nun
- Irena Radović (born 1978), Montenegrin diplomat
- Irena Roterman-Konieczna, Polish biochemist and researcher
- Irena Santor (born 1934), Polish singer and actress
- Irena Sawicka (1890–1944), Polish archaeologist and ethnographer
- Irena Natalia Sawicka, Polish linguist
- Irena Schusterová (1937–2008), First Lady of Slovakia (1999–2004)
- Irena Scott, American author and physiologist
- Irena Šedivá (born 1992), Czech javelin thrower
- Irena Sedlecká (1928–2020), Czech sculptor
- Irena Sendler (1910–2008), Polish social worker and resistance member who saved Jewish children during the Nazi occupation
- Irena Šiaulienė (born 1955), Lithuanian politician
- Irena Šinko (born 1964), Slovenian politician
- Irena Škorić (born 1981), Croatian film director and screenwriter
- Irena Škulj, Yugoslav tennis player
- Irena Skwierczyńska (1897–1984), Polish actress
- Irena Solska (1877–1958), Polish actress
- Irena Soukupová (1964–2020), Czech rower
- Irena Spasić, Serbian computer scientist
- Irena Stankiewicz (born 1925), Polish graphic artist
- Irena Stefoska (born 1967), Macedonian historian and politician
- Irena Svobodová (born 1953), Czech volleyball player
- Irena Swanson, Yugoslav-born American mathematician
- Irena Szewińska (1946–2018), Polish sprinter
- Irena Sznajder (born 1977), Polish sprinter
- Irena Szydłowska (1928–1983), Polish archer
- Irena Tanova (born 1984), Bulgarian sport shooter
- Irena Tichá (born 1943), Czech volleyball player
- Irena Tomašovičová (born 1964), Slovak handball player
- Irena Trečiokaitė-Žebenkienė (1909–1985), Lithuanian painter
- Irena Turkevycz-Martynec (1899–1983), Ukrainian-Canadian opera singer
- Irena Tuwim (1898–1987), Polish poet and translator
- Irena Veisaitė (1928–2020), Lithuanian academic and human rights activist
- Irena Vrkljan (1930–2021), Croatian writer
- Irena Vujović (born 1983), Serbian politician
- Irena Weissowa (1888–1981), Polish painter
- Irena Więckowska (born 1982), Polish fencer
- Irena Yebuah Tiran (born 1974), Slovene singer
- Irēna Žauna (born 1981), Latvian hurdler
- Irena Zemanová (born 1977), Czech figure skater
- Irena Žerjal (1940–2018), Slovene poet, writer and translator
