= Flag of Příbram =

Flag of Příbram

Flag of Příbram is the official symbol of the Czech city of Příbram. The other symbols are the coats of arms.

== Design ==
The rate of a box flag's width to length is 3:2. The flag consists of a bottom red strip and a top white strip, both covering three sevenths of the overall width of the flag. A blue strip is inserted between them, one seventh of the flag's width wide.

== Usage ==
The usage of the symbols of Příbram (Příbram coat of arms, Březové Hory coat of arms and Příbram flag) is regulated by the municipal ordinance.

If three flags are hoisted, the flag of the Czech Republic is in the middle, the other state's flag is on the right side and the Příbram's flag is on the left side. If only two flags are hoisted, the Czech flag is on the right and the Příbram's flag on the left (all directions are considered from the front view).

When hoisting the flag vertically, the white strip must be always located on the left side from the front view.

The abuse of the symbols is an offence according to the Czech law.
