= Ševčiny mine =

Mine in Příbram VI-Březové Hory, Czech Republic

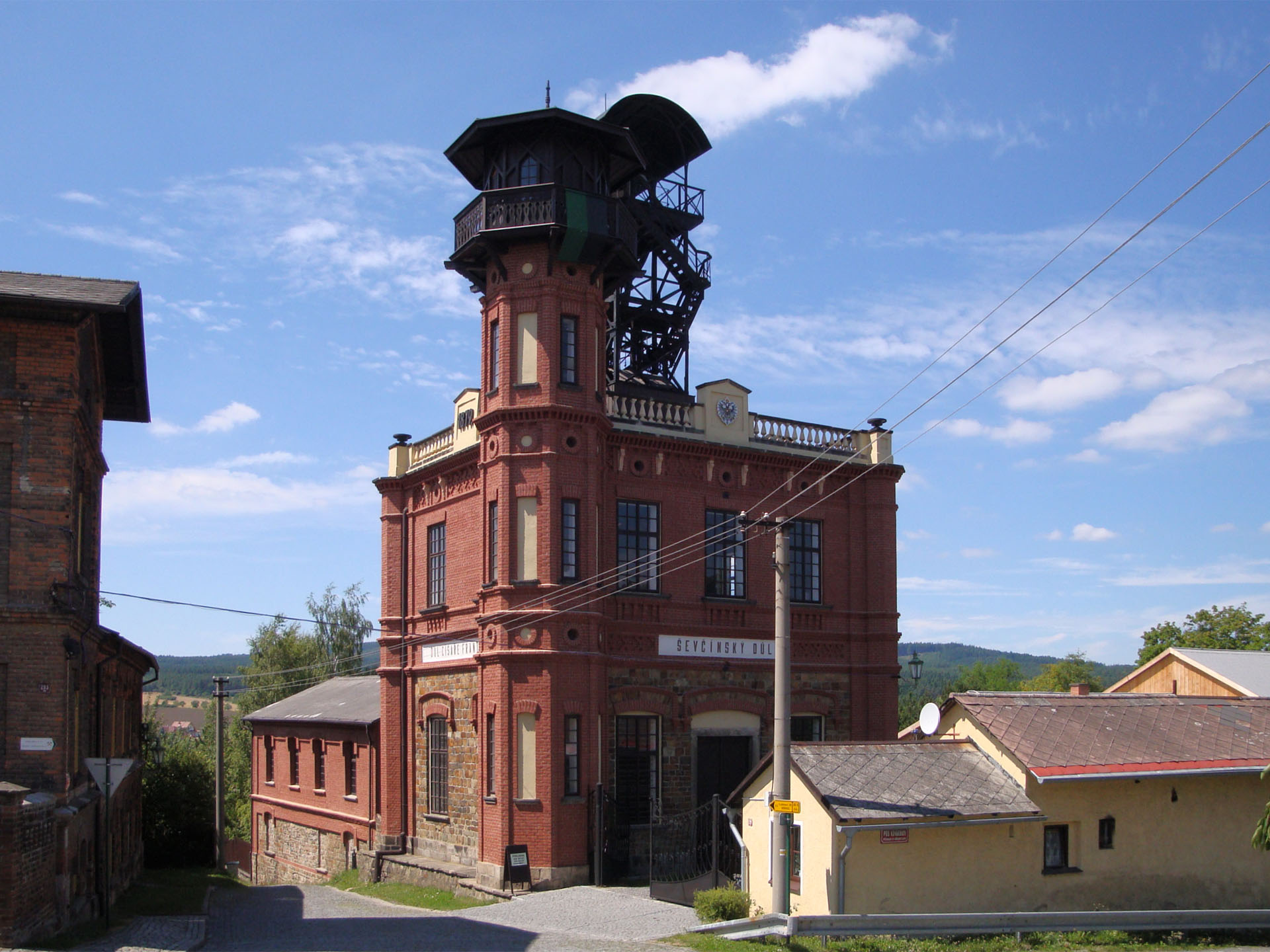
- Ševčiny mine

- Location within Czech Republic
- Location: Central Bohemia Region, Czech Republic; 49°40′59″N 13°59′13″E
- Products: silver, lead ore
- Opened: 1813
- Closed: 1989

The Ševčiny mine (Czech: Ševčinský důl, also důl Ševčiny or šachta císaře Františka Josefa I or francšachta) is a retired silver and lead ore mine at Březové Hory, Czech republic. Today the mine is a Czech national monument and is managed by the Mining Museum Příbram.

The mine was given its name according to the Ševčiny vein, which was one of the most important veins in the mineral district Březové Hory.

The maximum depth reached at Ševčiny mine was 1 108.2 meters in 1914. The mine consists of 35 floors and, like most mines in the area, is connected with the other mines by the Dědičná adit. The pit profile is 5.4x3 m.

== History ==
The mine was founded in 1813 at the instigation of the Higher Mining Authority, who proposed that a new pit be established on the Martyrs' vein (Mučednická žíla). A pump shaft already has existed here since 1600. Since the vein led vertically downwards, only few horizontal corridors had to be driven.

Mine heyday was the second half of the 19th century. In 1878, a depth of 433.3 m was reached. In 1880, a steam engine was installed at the mine, allowing mining from greater depths. This led to new operational buildings construction in 1879–80. The maximum mine depth was reached in 1909 - 1092.1 m on the 32nd floor. In 1884, a narrow-gauge mining railway was established to connect the Ševčiny mine, through the Ševčiny adit, with the treatment plants at the Vojtěch mine.

In 1910 the pit operation was stopped for economic reasons, although it was sporadically mined during the 20th century.

== Present ==
In 1978, after the mining in the Březové Hory district was suspended, the pit operation ceased and in 1989 the pit was closed by backfill. In 1978-79 the mine became the foundation of the newly established Mining Museum Příbram. The Ševčiny mine complex includes:

- Shaft building
- Engine room (mining supercharger), Gallows Frame
- Show room
- Cáchovna (registration room, 1880) - exposition of mining history
- Driving wheel from mining lift used from the 16th till the 19th century, Middle Ages pulley and miners' bell tower
- miners' spa

Despite its relatively small dimensions, the shaft building with the mining tower (the only preserved steel mining tower in Březové Hory) has significant European importance in industrial architecture. It can be considered one of the best preserved and most valuable heritage mining towers in central Europe.

== Recognition ==
It was declared a Czech national monument in 1958 and was added to the national cultural monuments list in 2014 as part of the Mining Monuments Complex in Březové Hory.

In 2007 the Czech National bank issued a 2500 CZK commemorative gold coin as part of the Industrial Heritage Sites series. The coin was designed by Luboš Charvát.
