= Příbram =

- Town
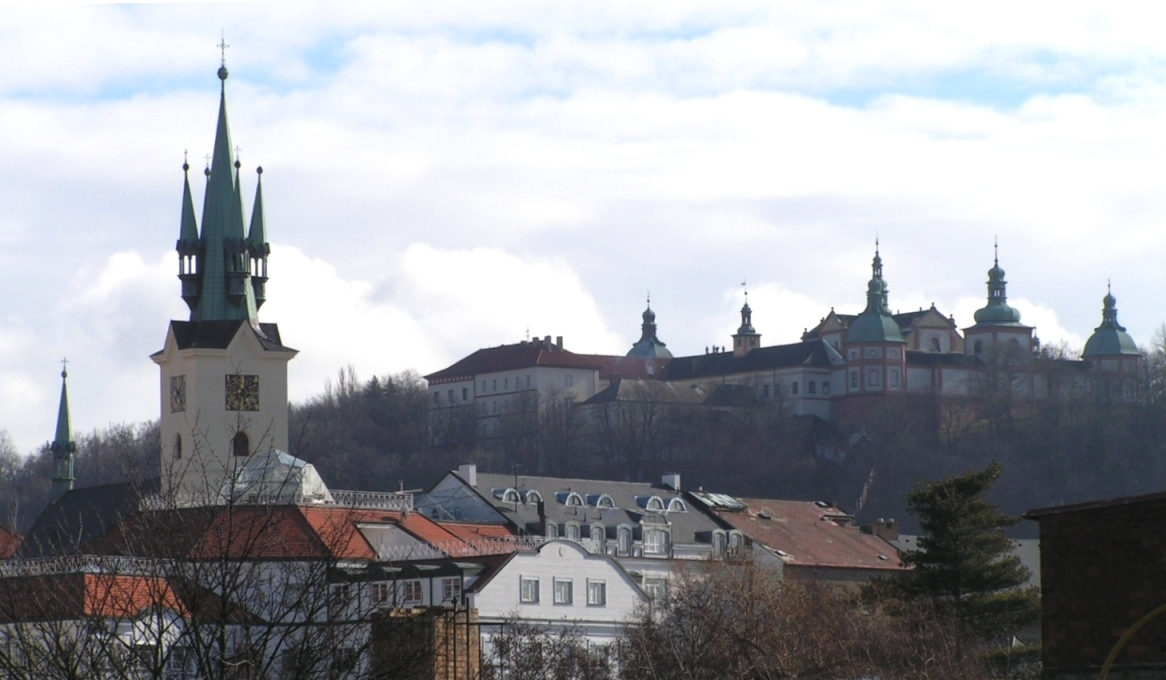
- Svatá Hora pilgrimage site and the Church of Saint James the Great

- Flag Coat of arms

- Location in the Czech Republic
- Coordinates: 49°41′18″N 14°0′33″E
- Country: Czech Republic
- Region: Central Bohemian
- District: Příbram
- First mentioned: 1216

Government
  - Mayor: Markéta Škodová

Area
  - Total: 36.10 km^{2} (13.94 sq mi)
- Elevation: 502 m (1,647 ft)

Population (2026-01-01)
  - Total: 32,917
  - Density: 911.8/km^{2} (2,362/sq mi)
- Time zone: UTC+1 (CET)
  - Summer (DST): UTC+2 (CEST)
- Postal code: 261 01
- Website: pribram.eu

Příbram (Czech pronunciation: [ˈpr̝̊iːbram]; German: Pribram or Przibram) is a town in the Central Bohemian Region of the Czech Republic. It has about 33,000 inhabitants. It is located on the Litavka River in the Brdy Highlands.

Příbram is the third-largest in the Central Bohemian Region (behind Kladno and Mladá Boleslav), and is a natural administrative and cultural centre of the southwestern part of the region, although it also tends to be largely influenced by the proximity of Prague. The town is known for its mining history, and more recently, its new venture into economic restructuring.

The Svatá Hora pilgrimage site above the town is the oldest and most important Marian pilgrimage site in Bohemia. Příbram is also known for the Mining Museum Příbram.

== Administrative division ==
Příbram consists of 18 municipal parts (in brackets population according to the 2021 census):

- Příbram I (2,461)
- Příbram II (2,088)
- Příbram III (3,486)
- Příbram IV (1,650)
- Příbram V-Zdaboř (3,919)
- Příbram VI-Březové Hory (1,704)
- Příbram VII (10,135)
- Příbram VIII (4,209)
- Příbram IX (341)
- Brod (111)
- Bytíz (24)
- Jerusalem (100)
- Jesenice (46)
- Kozičín (233)
- Lazec (287)
- Orlov (311)
- Zavržice (43)
- Žežice (563)

Bytíz forms an exclave of the municipal territory.

== Etymology ==
The name is derived from the personal name Heinricus Pribrami and originally meant "Pribrami's (court)".

== Geography ==
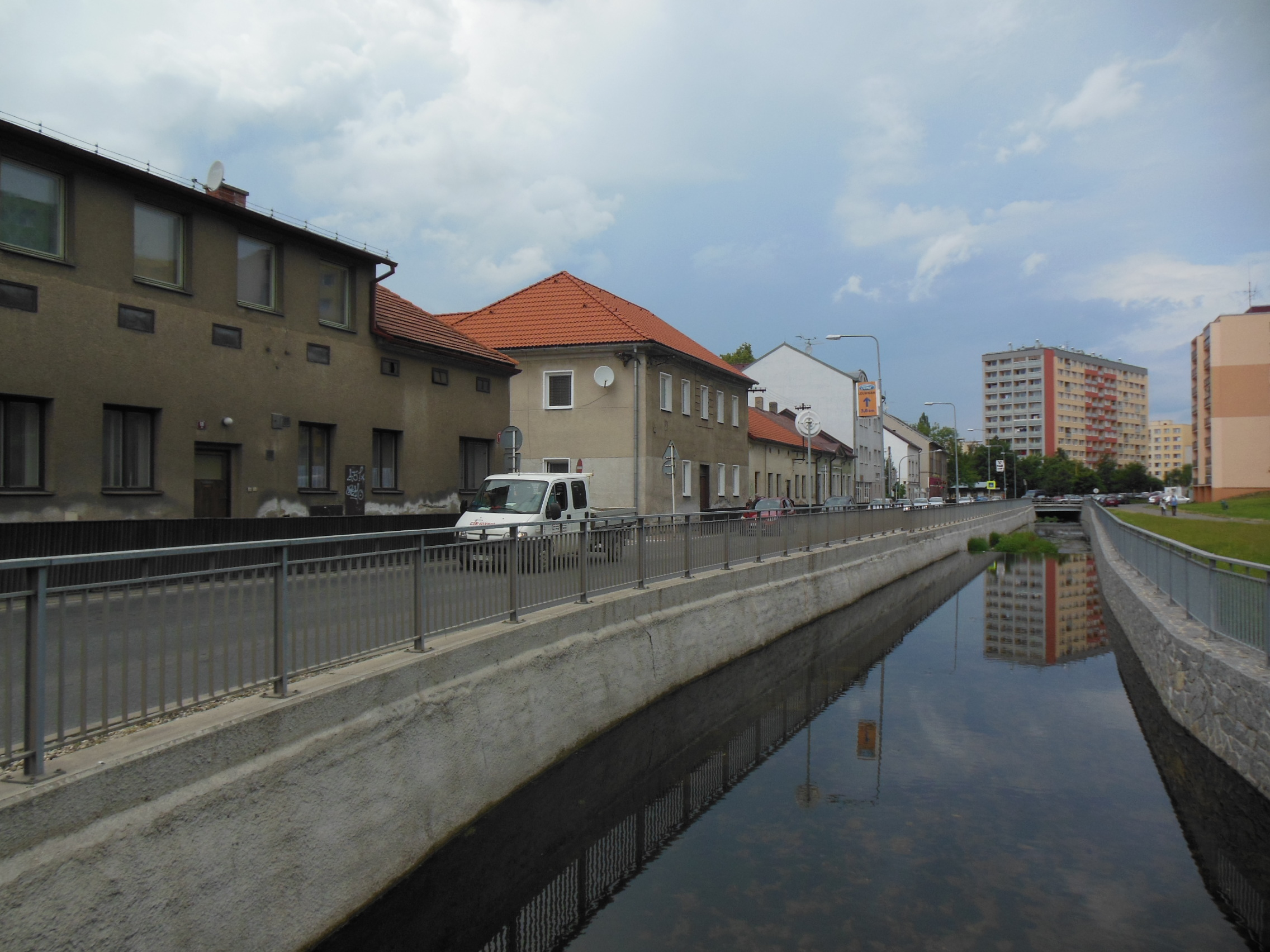
Březnická street with the Příbramský potok

Příbram is located about 46 kilometres (29 mi) southwest of Prague. It lies in the Brdy Highlands. The highest point of the municipal territory is the hill Vojna at 667 m (2,188 ft) above sea level. A dominant feature of the town centre is the hill Svatá hora at 590 m (1,940 ft) above sea level.

The town is situated mostly on the right bank of the Litavka River. The stream Příbramský potok flows through the town and feeds a set of fishponds in the town centre.

== History ==
=== 13th–15th centuries ===
The first written mention of Příbram is from 1216, when the nobleman Hroznata of Teplá sold Příbram to Ondřej, bishop of Prague. Soon the settlement became a market town with a church. Příbram was devastated during the disturbances in the second half of the 13th century. The Bishopric of Prague invited new settlers to the market town and a period of prosperity began.

The castle in Příbram was built by order of Archbishop Arnošt of Pardubice. New villages were founded in the vicinity of Příbram, and were administered from the castle. In the 15th century, the majority of the population was Czech, but there were also Germans who came to the area around the market town to mine silver. During the Hussite Wars (1419–1434), Příbram stood on the reformation side. After the war, it ceased to be church property and was acquired by the king, who pledged it to his creditors. However, the temporary administrators were not interested in the development of the market town, which meant a gradual decline. In 1497, Příbram was promoted to a town by Vladislaus II.

=== 16th–19th centuries ===
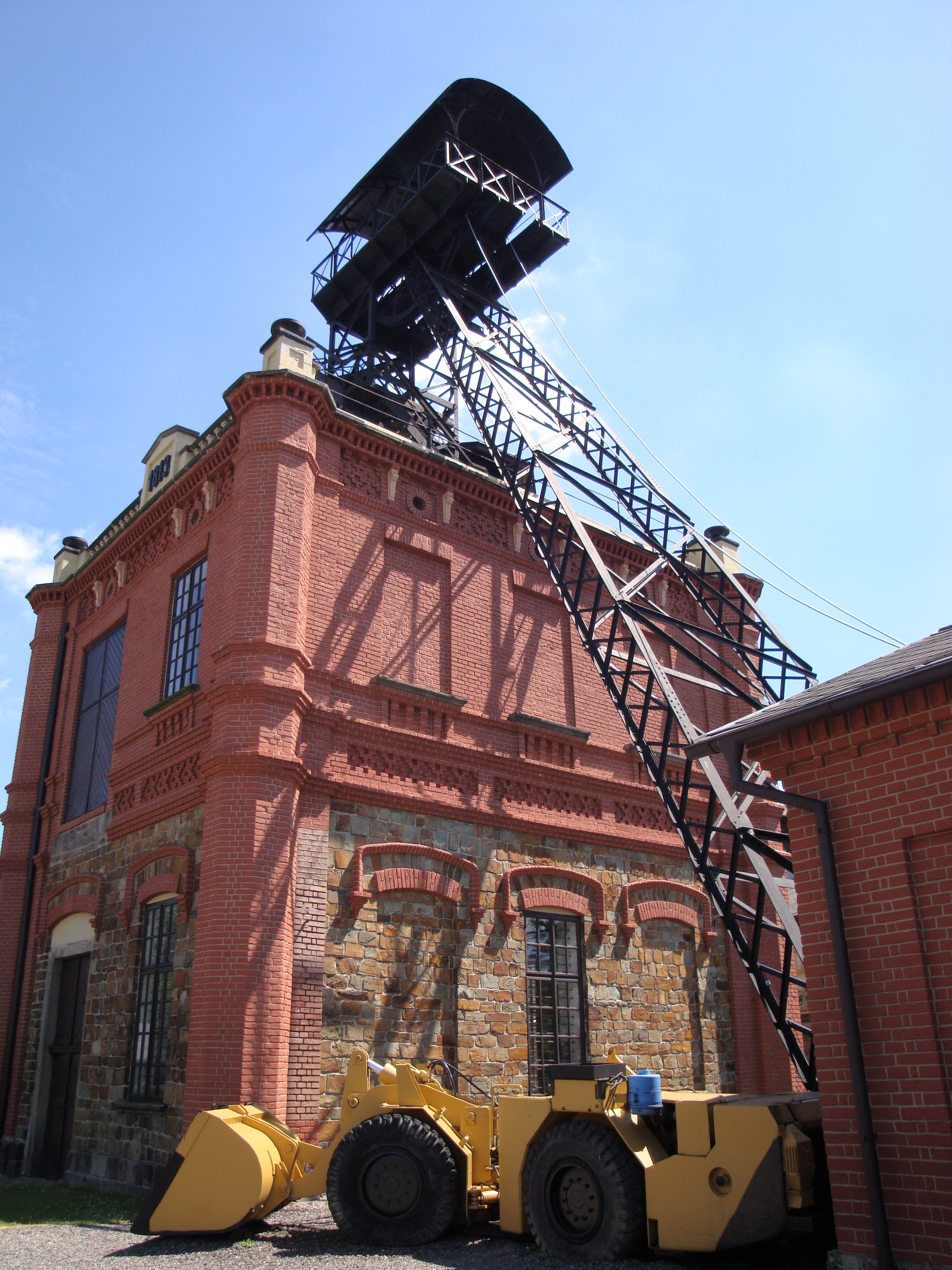
Ševčínský mine – mining tower

At the beginning of the 16th century, silver mining began to develop and the mining settlement Březové Hory was established. In the mid-16th century, the mining declined. This lasted until 1579, when Emperor Rudolf II promoted Příbram to the royal mining town. Since then, the town of Příbram prospered, but the settlement of Březová Hora remained insignificant.

The Thirty Years' War had a large impact on Příbram, lowering the population and causing violent recatholicization that was supported by the growing importance of Svatá Hora, nearby the pilgrimage site. The town did not recover until the end of the 17th century, when iron ore mining developed.

Silver mining continued but was not very profitable, so Příbram gave up the majority of its mining profit share over in favor of central government in Vienna. This turned out to be a mistake, as in the 18th century Příbram became the site of the most profitable silver mining in the entire Habsburg monarchy. The town became the seat of the central mining institutions and, in the mid-19th century, also the mining academy. Peak prosperity lasted until the 1880s, after which it stagnated until the end of the 19th century. In 1897, Březové Hory was promoted to a royal mining town. The importance of Příbram mines declined after 1900, but the town's reputation as the educational and cultural centre remained high.

=== 20th century ===
In the 1920s, uraninite mining expanded dramatically, bringing increased investment and growth in the town.

Region with strong partisan resistance was around Příbram during World War II. Several prominent citizens participated in the resistance, and many were killed by Nazi occupiers. Student Antonín Stočes, his father, and Příbram's gymnasium director Josef Lukeš were executed in Tábor in 1942 following the assassination of Reichsprotektor Reinhard Heydrich. Their story was idealized in Jan Drda's fiction Higher Principle.

In 1953, the towns of Příbram and Březové Hory were merged.

The last epoch of Příbram mining occurred since the 1950s, when the district was opened again for uraninite mining and several mines around the town were opened. The industry was included into a program of penal labour that communist Czechoslovak government used for persecution of regime objectors. Labor camps Příbram-Vojna and Příbram-Brody were run there in 1949–1951, holding up to 800 detainees. In 1976 and in 1980, many surrounding municipalities were annexed to Příbram, increasing the total population to more than 35,000 citizens.

Located near the Brdy military area, Příbram was an important locality during the 1968 Occupation of Czechoslovakia by the Warsaw Pact forces. The army command in Příbram was labeled a "focus of contrarevolution" in the Czechoslovak Army, as it did not cooperate with the occupation forces and harboured the Czechoslovak Television during its independent broadcasting. The rioting of Příbram-Bytíz crime prisoners and the strike of Příbram miners were the other major events related to the August 1968 invasion.

The 1989 Velvet Revolution influenced Příbram significantly. Large mining enterprises, old silver and lead mines as well as modern uranium ore mines, were closed, but new opportunities opened up for the town and the economy diversified.

== Demographics ==
Historical population

Year	Pop.	±%
1869	14,051	—
1880	16,952	+20.6%
1890	21,081	+24.4%
1900	21,767	+3.3%
1910	20,826	−4.3%

Year	Pop.	±%
1921	17,703	−15.0%
1930	15,464	−12.6%
1950	13,614	−12.0%
1961	26,803	+96.9%
1970	29,993	+11.9%

Year	Pop.	±%
1980	35,123	+17.1%
1991	36,898	+5.1%
2001	35,886	−2.7%
2011	33,084	−7.8%
2021	31,711	−4.2%

Source: Censuses

== Economy ==
Příbram's economy was determined by the mining industry and supplying companies for hundreds of years. At the end of the 1980s, when the mining was slowly derogating, the basic Příbram corporations included Český státní uranový průmysl (lit. 'Czech State Uranium Industry'), Rudné doly (lit. 'Ore Mines') and suppliers such as ZRUP – Základna rozvoje uranového průmyslu (lit. 'Base of Uranium Industry Development') and others.

After 1989, the economy restructured because of the closure of mines and privatisation. The nationwide important branch office of state enterprise Diamo is the successor of the Uranium Mines; the office is named Administration of Uranium Deposits (Správa uranových ložisek). Several of the supplying companies continue their activities under new owners.

The largest employer based in the town is the hospital. There is no large industrial enterprise in Příbram today, but many medium-sized enterprises are located here. The largest industrial employer is Ravak, which is the biggest producer of baths and shower-baths in central and eastern Europe.

The District Economic Chamber Příbram was founded in 1993.

== Transport ==
The state road I/18 (from Rožmitál pod Třemšínem to Votice) runs through the town. The D4 motorway runs east of the town and bypasses the Bytíz exclave.

Intratown transport is run by Arriva Střední Čechy, s.r.o. company. The bus terminal is located next to the railway station, the busiest hub for town buses is, however, located in the Jiráskovy sady near the Pražská street.

Příbram is located on the railway line of supraregional importance from Prague to České Budějovice, and on the railway line of regional importance from Beroun to Blatná.

The Příbram airfield (ICAO airport code LKPM) is located outside of the municipal territory in Dlouhá Lhota, 6 km (4 mi) northeast of Příbram. It is a recreational aerodrome.

== Culture ==
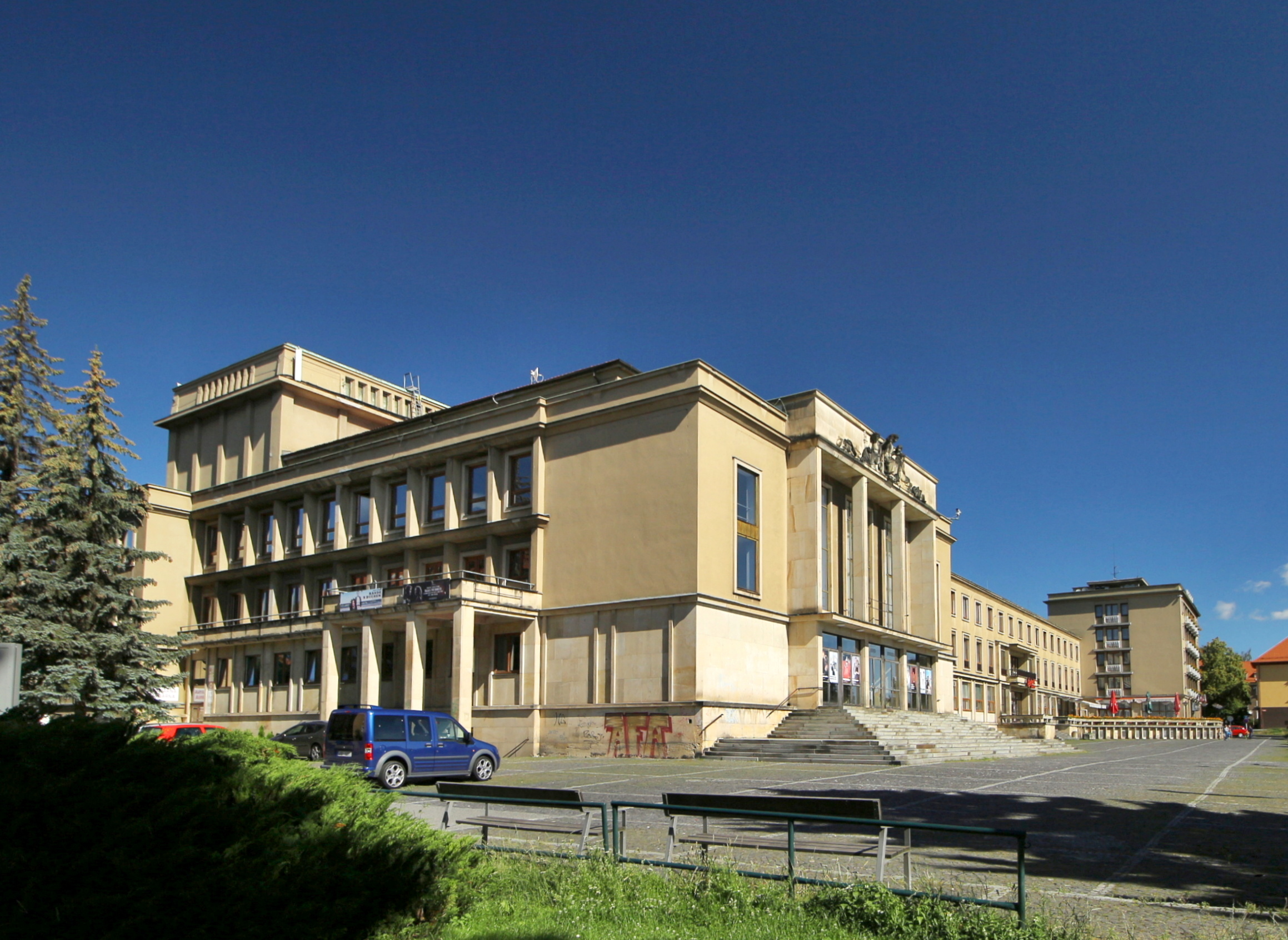
House of Culture with the Antonín Dvořák Theatre

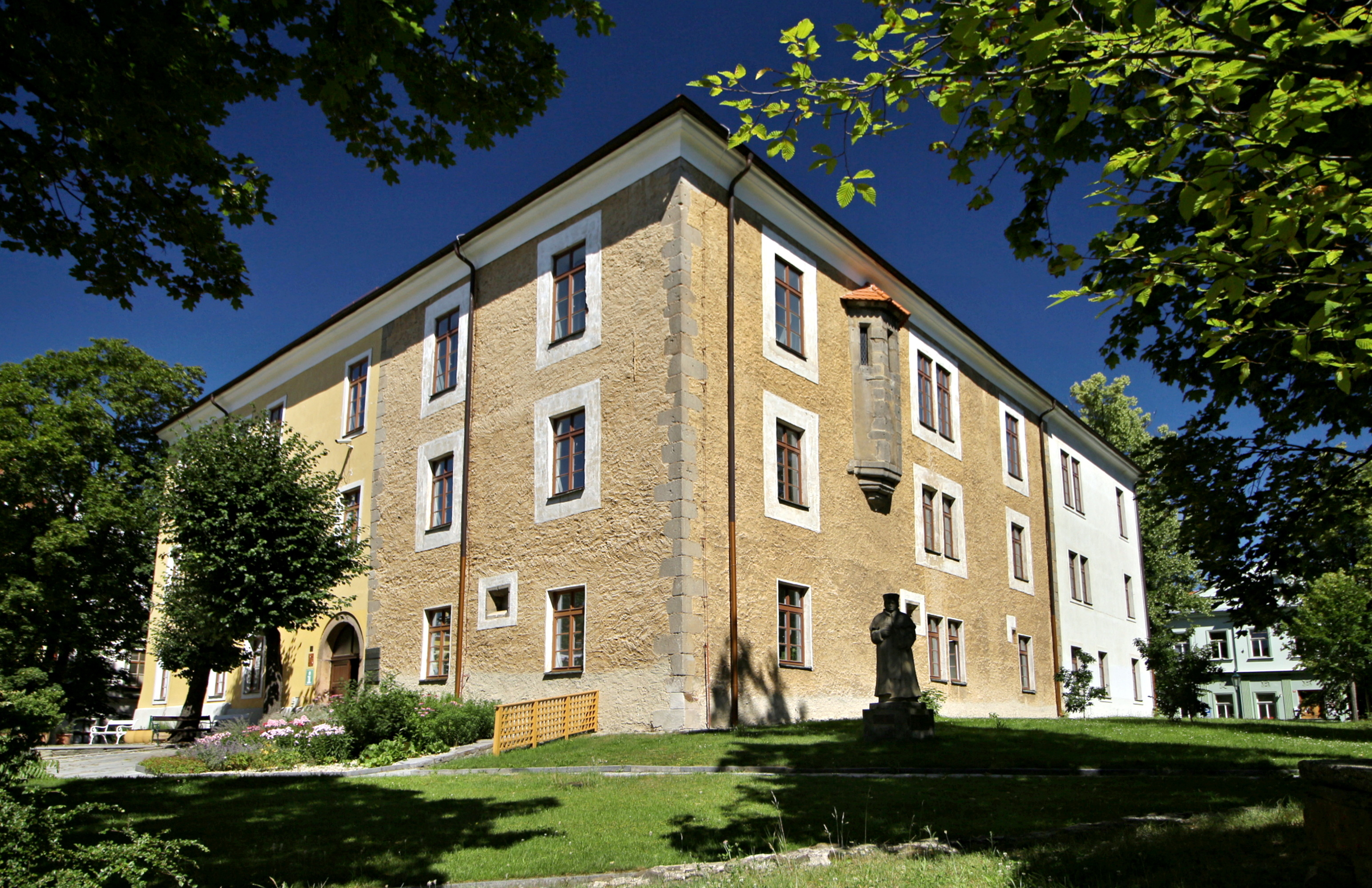
Zámeček-Ernestinum

Thanks to the high level of education and cultural life in the town, Příbram was nicknamed Podbrdské Atény ("Athens below Brdy") at the end of the 19th century. The town's culture was then largely influenced by the mining industry, which went on until the 1980s.

The town library was opened in 1900. It has been located in its current building since 1984 and bears the name of Jan Drda, who is the most famous writer born in Příbram.

The A. Dvořák Theatre in Příbram was founded in 1959. It is a permanent scene with a professional ensemble. The House of Culture, which hosts the theatre, was built in 1957–1959. Today it is protected as a cultural monument.

In 1969, the annual Antonín Dvořák Music Festival was founded in Příbram. It has both domestic and foreign participation and each year consists of 13–15 concerts. The festival is named after the composer Antonín Dvořák, who is connected with the region and whose works often appear in the festival program.

Příbram is known for the Příbram Children Choir. It was founded in 1939 by Antonín Vepřek.

The František Drtikol Gallery seats in the Zámeček-Ernestinum building and offers permanent exhibition of František Drtikol. Drtikol, a native of Příbram, was the first Czech photographer to gain world recognition during his lifetime. The gallery displays his work from 1901 to 1935.

== Education ==
Příbram was the site of the Mining University, the tradition of which still continues today however the institution was moved to Ostrava in 1945.

With the removal of the Mining University, Příbram lost the status of university town. In the 1990s, the town authorities aspired for the status again. In 2005 the College of European and Regional Studies (Czech: Vysoká škola evropských a regionálních studií, VŠERS) with seat in České Budějovice opened its affiliate in Příbram, with 30 students in the courses.

High schools offer in Příbram includes two gymnasiums, technical school, business academy, medical school and training college. Gymnasium Příbram was founded 1871 and serves as a general educational propaedeutics institutions for applicants for university studies. The Pod Svatou Horou gymnasium was founded in the 1990s. The technical school was derived from the preliminary courses of the Mining University, so called Mining School, founded already in 1851. In 2006 the school had 564 students.

Seven elementary schools are in Příbram, six of them with traditional educational program (the number was reduced by two in the 1990s). The remaining one, found in 1991, stands on the Waldorf education program and it has also opened its own high school.

The town has 13 kindergartens and runs also two musical and art schools.

=== Mining University in Příbram (1894–1945) ===
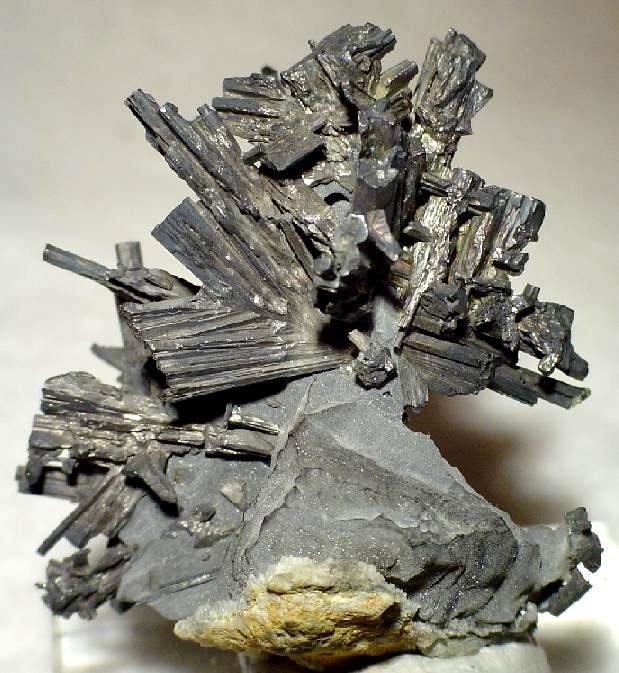
Dyscrasite specimen from a uranium mine near Příbram

Mining education in Příbram dates from the beginning of the 19th century. The School of Mines was founded in 1851 and it was changed to Mining Academy in 1865. It was then the only mining educational institution in the Czech lands. The academy struggled in the shadow of Leoben academy, which repeatedly obtained its privileges in advance.

Important professors and lecturers of this era include:

- Geologist František Pošepný: one of the most important educators in the 19th century and of all the school's history;
- Mine surveyor (German: Markscheider) Gustav Ziegelheim: Professor for mining, ore processing and mine surveying as of 1882, Director of the School of Mines in 1883–1885 and in 1889–1895.

In 1894, the academy received its university status decree and A. Hoffmann was elected the first chancellor of the university in 1898.

At the beginning of the 20th century the national conflicts lead to attempts to move Leoben academy to Vienna, while the Příbram school should have been dissolved. Long proceedings and the fact, that three quarters of the mining production of the Austria-Hungary was provided by the mines in the Czech lands, resulted in keeping both mining schools (Leoben and Příbram) alive. In 1904 both Leoben and Příbram institutions were renamed Mining Academy (Czech: Vysoká škola báňská) with Josef Theurer as the first chancellor.

The university started with 11 departments, but the number grew to 18 in 1924. The university had the right to name doctors of mining sciences (dr. mont.). The highest number of students was almost 500 in 1921, but in the late 1930s the number fell to 120.

The position of the institution changed basically after arousal of Czechoslovakia in 1918, one year later the Czech language became the official language of the university. Many attempts to move it out of Příbram recurred, several of them initiated from the university itself, but they were refused.

World War II and the closure of Czech universities interrupted the work of the institution, which was resumed in 1945. The university was however moved to Ostrava within few months to bring the education closer to the booming mining industry in the Ostrava region. The last mining university students left Příbram in 1946 summer.

== Sport ==
Příbram is the home of football club of FK Příbram, successor of past Dukla Prague. It plays at the Na Litavce Stadium. In 2024, after 30 years in professional competitions, the club was relegated to the Bohemian Football League (third tier). The other town's football club is Spartak Příbram. Founded as Horymír Příbram, it is the fifth oldest Czech football club. It plays in lower amateur tiers.

Příbram's volleyball club VK Trox Příbram has been a member of the Czech top division since 1998. The club was founded in 1935 and is nicknamed Kocouři ('tomcats').

A notable event is the rallying competition Rally Příbram. It has been held annually in the town since 1979.

== Sights ==
Svatá Hora

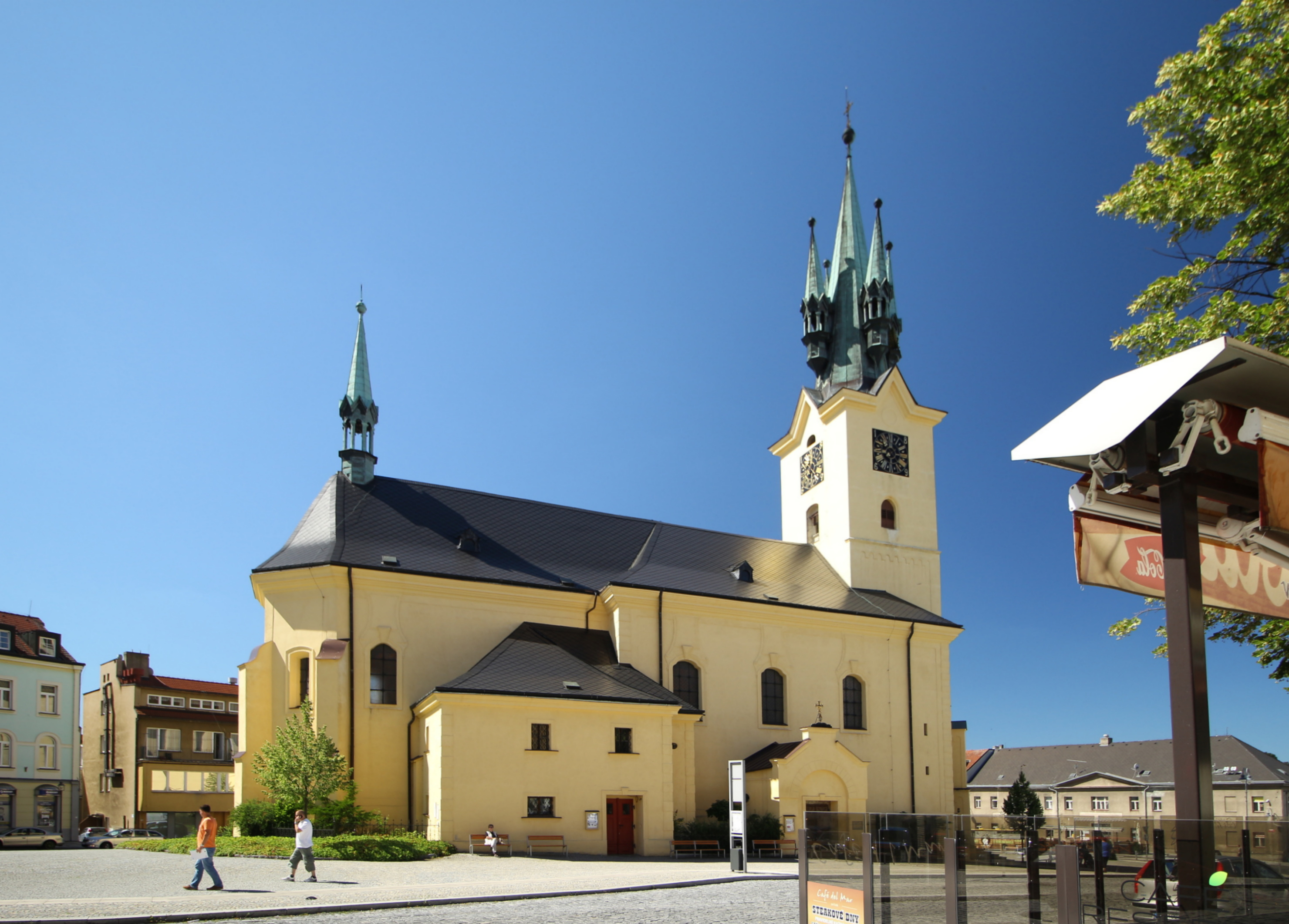
Church of Saint James the Great

=== Svatá Hora ===
The landmark of Příbram and the most valuable monument is Svatá Hora (literally 'holy mountain'). It is the oldest and most important Marian pilgrimage site in Bohemia, protected as a national cultural monument. It consists of a Baroque monastery complex, cloisters and chapels. The cult of the statue of Saint Mary of Svatá Hora began in the 14th century, when, according to legend, it was carved by Bishop Arnošt of Pardubice himself. In 1647, a chapel on the hill Svatá hora was acquired by the Jesuits, who had rebuilt it to a magnificent temple in 1658–1675. This Basilica of the Assumption of the Virgin Mary of Svatá Hora was built according to the design of the architects Carlo Lurago and Benjamin Schleyer, and decorated by Jan Brokoff, Petr Brandl and other famous artists. Next to the basilica is a Baroque residence. The complex is connected to the town by a 450 m (1,480 ft) long staircase from 1685, which was roofed in 1727–1728, and Kilian Ignaz Dientzenhofer also participated in the final form.

=== Historic centre ===
The landmark of the town centre is the Church of Saint James the Great. It is originally a Gothic building the first half of the 13th century, and is the oldest monument in Příbram. It was rebuilt several times, most notably in the Baroque style in the 18th century. The current form of the church dates from 1869, when the tower acquired four side Neo-Gothic turrets. The most valuable interior decoration includes two wood carvings by Ignác František Platzer and a tin baptismal font from 1511.

Zámeček-Ernestinum is one of the most important historical buildings in Příbram. It was originally a wooden fort, rebuilt into a small stone castle in the mid-14th century, which served as the archbishop's residence. The building was damaged in the Hussite Wars and in the Thirty Years' War, and many inappropriate construction modifications were made. Therefore, only the Gothic bay window of the chapel with a ribbed vault and a few other elements have survived to this day. Today it serves cultural and social purposes. It houses the Gallery of František Drtikol, Museum of the Anti-communist Resistance, and offices.

The Town Hall was built in the Neo-Renaissance style in 1889–1891. It was designed by architect Vojtěch Ignác Ullmann. The second notable building designed by Ullmann is the Neo-Renaissance dormitory from 1892.

=== Březové Hory and surroundings ===
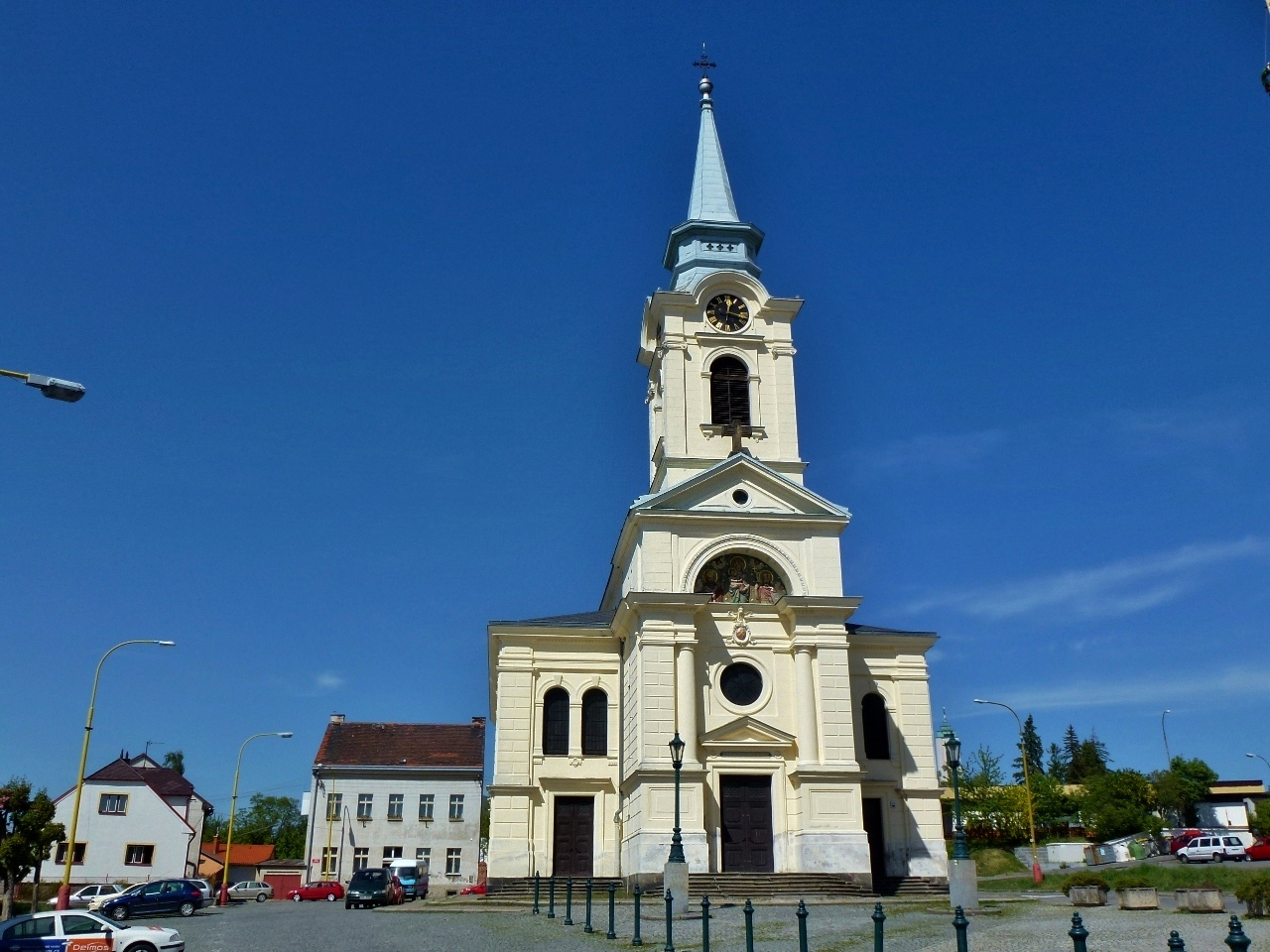
Church of Saint Adalbert

The Mining Museum Příbram was founded in 1886. It is the biggest mining museum in the Czech Republic. It contains five objects of historical mines with old headstock, miner's house, drift with a mining train, exhibition of mining history, geological collection and others. the museum also operates several other exhibitions around the town.

The Church of Saint Adalbert is the landmark of the main square in Březové Hory. It was built mostly in the Neo-Renaissance style, but it also has Neo-Baroque and Neo-Romanesque elements. It dates from 1889.

The Church of Saint Procopius was originally a chapel from 1732, which replaced a wooden bell tower from the 16th century. In 1879, most of the chapel was demolished and replaced by the current pseudo-Romanesque church.

The youngest ecclesiastical building is the temple of the Czechoslovak Hussite Church in memory of Master Jacob of Mies. It dates from 1936. It has a 30 m (98 ft) high tower, which also serves as an observation tower open to the public.

The House of Culture was designed by Václav Hilský and was built in the modern Neoclassical style in 1957–1959. The building is protected as a cultural monument. It also houses the Antonín Dvořák Theatre.

== Notable people ==
- Bohuslav Balbín (1621–1688), writer and poet; lived here
- František Pošepný (1836–1895), geologist, director of the School of Mines in Příbram
- Bohumil Fidler (1860–1944), composer, choirmaster and choir director
- Vjekoslav Bastl (1872–1947), Croatian architect
- Jiří Baborovský (1875–1946), chemist
- František Gellner (1881 – c. 1914), poet; studied here
- František Drtikol (1883–1961), photographer
- Hermína Týrlová (1900–1993), animator and film director
- Adina Mandlová (1910–1991), actress
- Jan Drda (1915–1970), writer
- Richard Tesařík (1915–1967), general and war hero
- Josef Doležal (1920–1999), athlete
- Ivan Fuksa (born 1963), politician
- Irena Dousková (born 1964), writer
- Martin Švejnoha (born 1977), footballer
- Patrik Štefan (born 1980), ice hockey player
- Tomáš Zápotočný (born 1980), footballer
- František Rajtoral (1986–2017), footballer
- Tomáš Pilík (born 1988), footballer
- Antonín Barák (born 1994), footballer
- Aleš Matějů (born 1996), footballer
- Václav Černý (born 1997), footballer

== Příbram meteorite ==
The town was the impact site of the Přibram meteorite in 1959. This was the first meteorite whose trajectory was tracked by multiple cameras recording the associated fireball. Several fragments of it were found close to Příbram at the nearby village of Luhy.

== Twin towns – sister cities ==
Příbram is twinned with:

- Anor, France
- Freiberg, Germany
- Hoorn, Netherlands
- Kežmarok, Slovakia
- Königs Wusterhausen, Germany
- Ledro, Italy
- Villerupt, France
