= Andriukaitis =

- Lithuanian surname
- m.: Andriukaitis
- f.: (unmarried): Andriukaitytė
- f.: (married): Andriukaitienė
- Origin: From Andriukas, diminutive of Andrius, Andrew

Andriukaitis is a Lithuanian language family name. It may refer to:

- Martynas Andriukaitis, Lithuanian basketball player
- Vytenis Andriukaitis, Lithuanian heart surgeon and politician
- Irena Andriukaitienė, Lithuanian politician

== See also ==
- Endriukaitis
