= František Pošepný =

Czech geologist

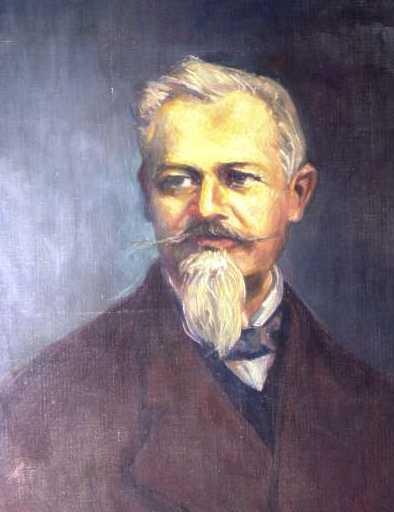
Portrait of František Pošepný

František "Franz" Pošepný (30 March 1836 – 27 March 1895) was a Czech scientist working in geology and related fields.

== Life ==
Born in Jilemnice, he studied at the Prague Polytechnic where he was accepted from the Příbram Mining College (later the Mining College of Further Education and now the Technical University of Ostrava). Like another well known Czech geologist František Vacek, he was influenced by the principal of Prague Polytechnic Johann Grimm. After graduating he worked as a mining trainee whilst studying at the Imperial Geological Institute in Vienna. During this time, he gained experience and knowledge in the field at various places in the Austro-Hungarian Empire.

In 1870 he was appointed a chief geologist for Hungary and conducted research on the Slovak deposits in Magurka, Špania Dolina, Kremnica and Nová Baňa. Four years later he returned to Vienna and served as vice chancellor at the former Ministry of Agriculture. In addition to his research in Austria, he visited the deposits in Nevada and California.

In 1879 he returned to Příbram, where he headed the School of Economic Geology and earned the title of professor. During this period he continued his research around the Příbram district. In 1889 he prematurely ended his work and retired to the suburbs of Vienna, from which he conducted a number of scientific tours across Europe and the Middle East.

He died in Döbling district of Vienna in the company of his wife, Clotilde Pošepný. According to his wishes, he was buried in his native town Jilemnice.

== Legacy ==
Pošepný is considered the founder of deposit geology, whose findings enable a more efficient extraction of ore. In his magnum opus The Genesis of Ore-Deposits (1893) Pošepný described a new theory of the origin of ore deposits. The theory received great recognition worldwide. In addition to this work, he is author of more than a hundred other specialized publications, including a study about Příbram and gold-bearing ores in central Bohemia.

The Academy of Sciences of the Czech Republic's "František Pošepný Honorary Medal for Merit in the Geological Sciences for contributions to the development of geological sciences" is named for him.
