= Jiří Baborovský =

Czech physical chemist (1875–1946)

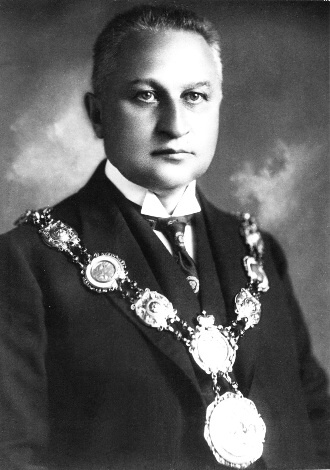
Baborovský in 1937

Jiří Baborovský Czech pronunciation (28 August 1875 in Březové Hory – 10 October 1946 in Brno) was a Czech physical chemist. He was pioneer in the study of kinetic chemical reactions. He wrote many textbooks widely used in Czechoslovakia.
