= Coat of arms of Příbram =

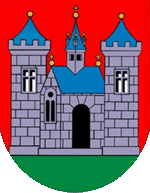
Small Coat of Arms of Příbram

The coat of arms of Příbram is the official symbol of the Czech city of Příbram.

== Current Look ==
The Příbram's coat of arms now has two different looks: big one, made of two shields of Příbram and Březové Hory and decorated with two figures of miners, and a small one, which is the original Příbram's shield.

=== Small Coat of Arms ===
On a red ground of the shield, on green grass soil, there stand two silver towers built from cut foursquare stones with a box window and cross frame inside. They have four block merlons and a blue pyramid roof with a gold finial. Between both towers, there is a church with a small tower, depicted abeam to the right side of the shield. It is built of cut silver foursquare stones, blue roof and two simple golden crosses erected on both ends of the roof on golden finials. In the middle is a silver tower with one box window in each of visible walls, its blue roof is topped with a golden finial and simple cross and three silver wallflowers. On a forefront of the church, there is a double-wing window topped with frill. In the side wall of the church, there is an open box-shaped door, rounded at the top. The window views are black and white, the door's one is all black.

=== Big Coat of Arms ===
The coat is made of two shields connected in an alliance. The right shield is the Příbram shield, the left one is the Březové Hory shield. On the top margin of both shields, one silver mural crown lies with five visible merlons. Two miners held the shields from both sides, they stand on a gold arabesque, which is located under the shields. Miners wear festive uniforms – silver trousers, black shoes and coats. They wear black cylinder caps with silver hammers crossed. The right one has beard, the left one has only a moustache. The left one holds a hammer, the left one holds a piolet.

== Usage ==
The usage of the symbols of Příbram (Příbram coat of arms, Březové Hory coat of arms and Příbram flag) is regulated by the municipal ordinance. The coat of arms can be used:

- by city and city districts authorities, corporations and persons for festive occasions;
- by city and city districts authorities, corporations and persons for regular occasions, pending preceding approval by city council.

The abuse of the symbols is an offence according to the Czech law.
