= Irena Dousková =

Czech writer and poet

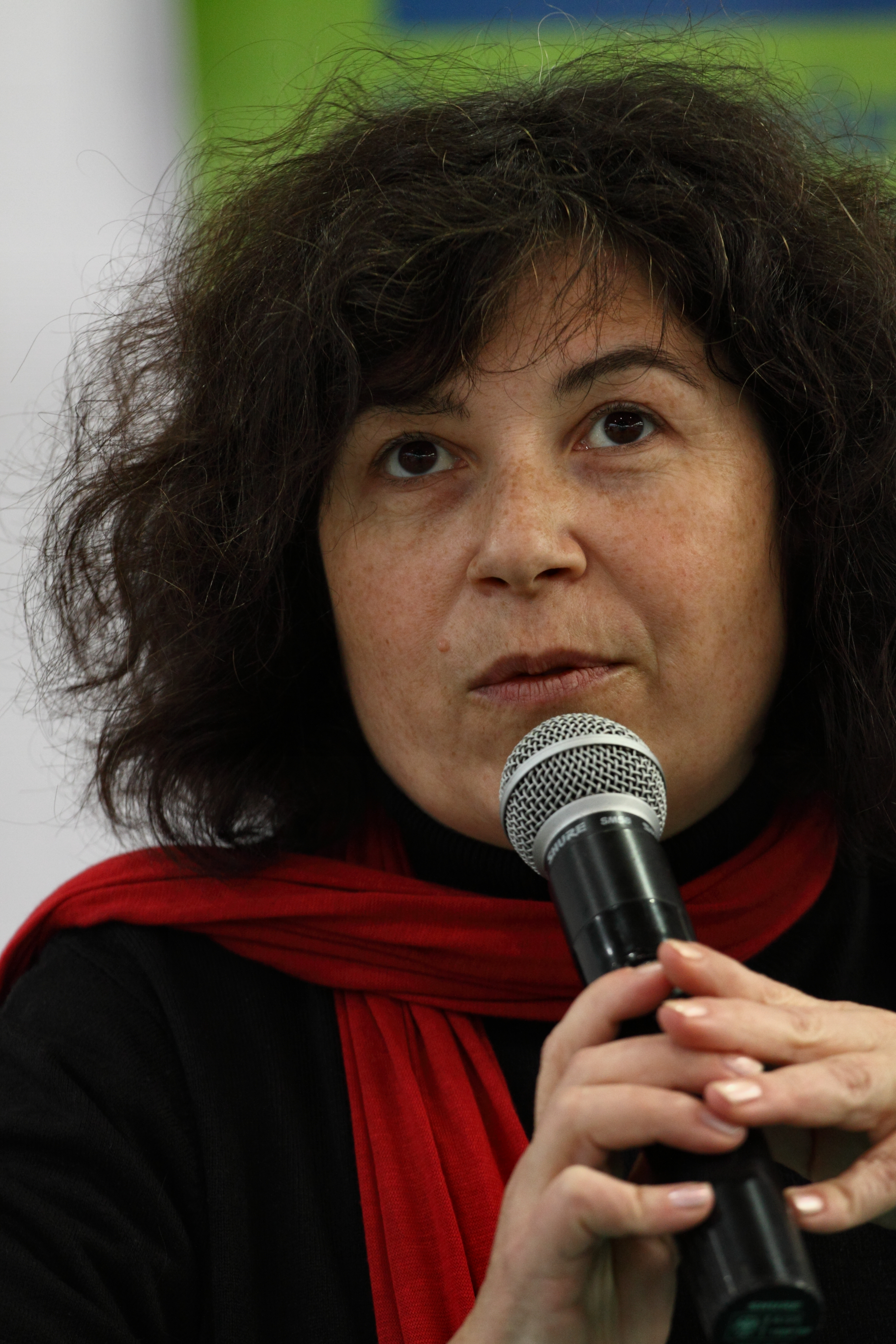
Irena Dousková at LIBRI 2009

Irena Dousková (18 August 1964) is a contemporary Czech author, who writes primarily novels, but also short stories and poetry.

== Life ==
Irena Dousková was born Irena Freistadtová in Příbram in 1964. She grew up around the acting scene. Both her mom and stepfather were actors in the Příbram Theatre. Her father, Petr Freistadt, was a theater director, who emigrated to Israel in 1964. She changed her last name from her father's name to her mother's maiden name, Dousková.

In 1976, Dousková's family moved to Prague. After graduating high school, she worked as a librarian and secretary, before being accepted to the faculty of Law at Charles University. She completed her degree in 1989, but never worked in law.

Instead, she worked as a playwright, and then as a journalist for several newspapers, before becoming a full-time author.

Dousková first emerged on the Czech literary scene through her poetry. She was a member of the group LiDi, and presented poetry through them starting in 1988. She also published in several magazines and newspapers. Only later did the focus of her work turn to prose.

== Works ==
In 1992, Dousková published a collection of poems, Pražský zázrak (Prague Miracle).

In 1997, she published her first work of prose, Goldstein píše dceři (Goldstein Writes to His Daughter), followed by Hrdý Budžes in 1998. Hrdý Budžes is her most highly regarded work by literary critics, and also the most popular among readers. It was also made into a play which became as popular as the original work.

Dousková continues to write a new novel about once every three years, and has also published short stories and poems.

Some hallmarks of Dousková's work include the use of irony and humor to address tragic themes. This allows her to describe dark periods in modern history, especially communist Czechoslovakia and Jewish history, in ways that will attract readers.

A trilogy of her works --- Hrdý Budžes, Oněgin byl Rusák (Onegin was a Russki) and Darda--- follows the story of a schoolgirl during the 1970s “normalization” period in Communist Czechoslovakia. Dousková was the same age as the protagonist during this time period, so she was able to use personal experience to add realism to the writing.

Dousková is one of the most successful modern Czech authors abroad, having been translated into at least thirteen different languages. Hrdý Budžes was translated into English by Melvyn Clarke in 2016 (with the title B. Proudew), and Clarke continues to translate her works into English.
