= Irena Tichá =

Czech volleyball player (born 1943)

Personal information
- Nationality: Czech
- Born: 16 February 1943 (age 82); Staré Smrkovice, Czechoslovakia

Sport
- Sport: Volleyball

Irena Tichá (born 16 February 1943) is a Czech volleyball player. She competed in the women's tournament at the 1968 Summer Olympics.
