= Irena Boclincă =

Moldovan theater actress

- Born: 4 December 1980 (age 45); Zăicani, Moldavian SSR, Soviet Union (now in Moldova
- Education: Academy of Music, Theater and Fine Arts
- Occupation: Former actress at the Eugène Ionesco National Theatre of Chișinău
- Years active: 2014–present

Irena Boclincă (born 4 December 1980) is a theater actress from Moldova who currently works and lives in Bucharest, Romania. She formerly played for the Eugène Ionesco National Theatre at Chișinău and is also a former television presenter.

== Biography ==
Irena Boclincă was born on 4 December 1980 in Zăicani, in Moldova.having formerly been married to stylist Valentin Vicol.

Boclincă graduated from the College of Medicine of Bălți, in Moldova, later studying at the Academy of Music, Theater and Fine Arts in Chișinău, also in Moldova, and then following her master studies at the George Enescu National University of Arts in Iași, Romania. Boclincă is currently an actress at the Constantin Tănase Magazine Theater in Bucharest, Romania.

Boclincă became popular in Moldova due to her numerous comic, satirical and dramatic roles, including the performance of the famous French artist Édith Piaf, played on the stage of the Eugène Ionesco National Theatre of Chișinău for seven years, but also due to the roles she played on the Iași National Theatre. Additionally, she also stood out in the Moldovan satirical show Shaving Hour, on Jurnal TV, presented by the Moldovan actors Constantin Cheianu and Anatol Durbală, where she played the role of the character Simona.

In February 2019, she became known to the general public in Romania due to her appearance on the show iUmor on Antena 1 in Bucharest, where she imitated Viorica Dăncilă, the then Prime Minister of Romania. On 1 June of the same year, she won the season 6 of iUmor. However, she donated the prize, worth around 20,000 euros, to competitor Vasi Borcan, who was immobilized in a wheelchair.
