= Irena Scott =

American author and physiologist

Irena McCammon Scott (born 1942) is an American author and physiologist. She received a BS from Ohio State University, an MS from the University of Nevada, and a PhD from the University of Missouri in the Department of Veterinary Medicine. Her post-doctoral studies were done at Cornell University.

She has been employed as an Assistant Professor (Department of Biology) at St. Bonaventure University, and has done research and teaching at the Ohio State University, the University of Missouri, the University of Nevada, and at Battelle Memorial Institute. She worked in related fields and for many years studied many species including bonobos and their behaviour. She was a correspondent for Popular Mechanics magazine. Scott has also worked as a volunteer astronomer at the Ohio State University Radio Observatory, as well as participated in UFO investigations for Defense Intelligence Agency and Center for UFO Studies. She is the author of six books, including on UFOs, and has contributed chapters and articles to several scientific journals, magazines, and newspapers. Her listings include Who's Who in the World, World Who's Who of Women, Who's Who in the Midwest, Dictionary of International Biography, and Who's Who in Frontier Science and Technology.

Her 2008 book, Uncle: My Journey with John Purdue, is a biography of John Purdue, founder of Purdue University and of the Purdue Block in Lafayette, Indiana. The foreword is by William Allen, author of Starkweather: Inside the Mind of a Teenage Killer, Aransas: The Life of a Texas Coastal County. The book is the first of the Founders Series, published by the Purdue University Press.

== Bibliography ==
- God is a Woman: The Last Taboo and Hidden Secrets at the Millennium, Greyden Press, 1999
- Uncle: My Journey with John Purdue, Purdue University Press, 2008
- Females Going Ape: Generating Life and Civilization, Orange Frazer Press, 2015
- UFOs Today: 70 Years of Lies, Misinformation & Government Cover-Up, Flying Disk Press, 2017
- Smith, Kevin, "Niece tells John Purdue's story", Lafayette Journal and Courier, April 6, 2008
