= Irena Pantelic =

Dutch model

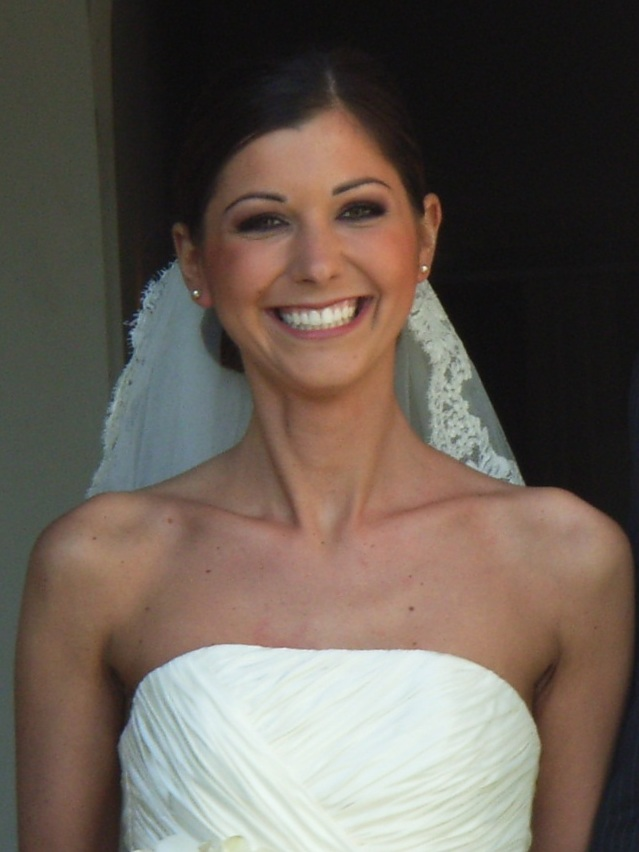
- Irena Pantelic (2007)
- Website: http://www.irena-pantelic.nl

Irena Pantelic (born 1981, Rotterdam) is a Dutch model and beauty pageant titleholder. She was crowned Miss Nederland 2001. She represented the Netherlands at the Miss World pageant in Sun City, South Africa. Pantelic was born in Rotterdam, her parents are immigrants from former Yugoslavia. She was raised in Capelle aan den IJssel and attended the Nationale Hogeschool voor Toerisme en Verkeer in Breda.

In 2001 she first became Miss South Holland and later went on to become Miss Netherlands. In 2002 she became a candidate for the Dutch Parliament for the Lijst Pim Fortuyn. Prior to the 2002 elections, turmoil erupted in the party, because Irena Pantelic and Antonia Viljac accused two other party members of sexual harassment in a letter to the party board.

This letter however, was leaked to the press and Irena Pantelic and Antonia Viljac were degraded on the candidate list. She was not elected in the elections of 2002, which took place only days after the assassination of the party's controversial leader Pim Fortuyn. She never returned to politics.

After her internship she started working as a model again, mainly in Lebanon and South Africa. In 2007 she got married. Since 2007, she has given birth to three children.

In 2009 she began working as a model again. In 2012 she became the licence holder for Miss South Holland, the local pageant for pre-selection of candidates for Miss Netherlands. In 2013 she was awarded the Campaign Award at the Dutch Model Awards.
