= Irena Svobodová =

Czech volleyball player (born 1953)

Personal information
- Nationality: Czech
- Born: 9 March 1953 (age 72); Teplice, Czechoslovakia

Sport
- Sport: Volleyball

Irena Svobodová (born 9 March 1953) is a Czech volleyball player. She competed in the women's tournament at the 1972 Summer Olympics.
