= Irena Kazazić =

Slovenian painter and writer (born 1972)

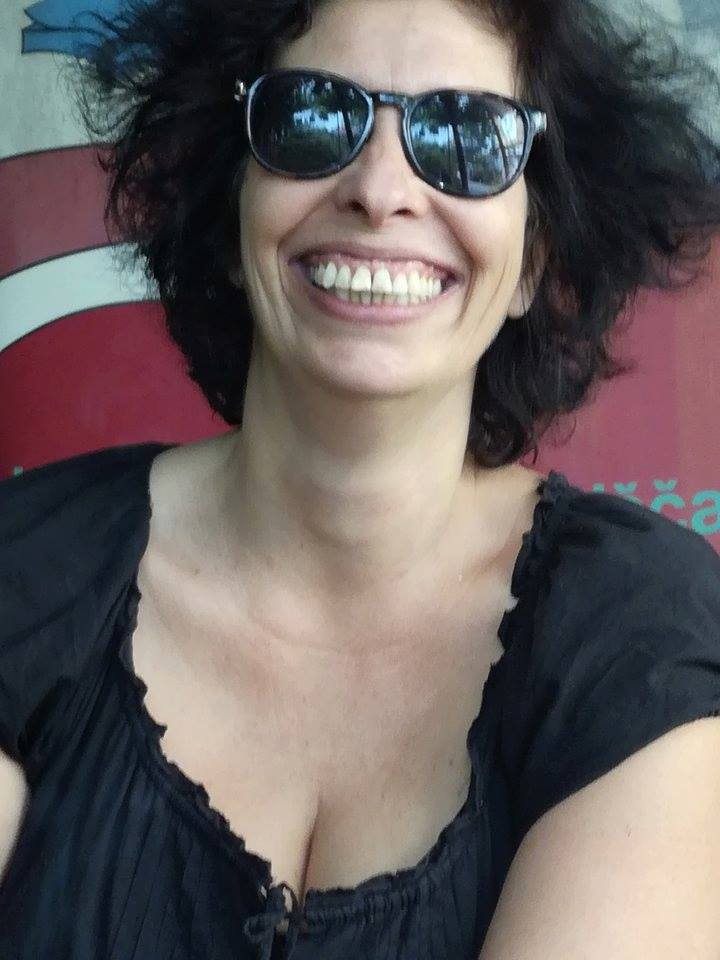
- Born: 1972 (age 53–54); Belgrade, SR Serbia, SFR Yugoslavia
- Known for: Painter and writer
- Movement: Pop art
- Website: www.irenakazazic.com

Irena Kazazić (born 1972) is a Serb-Slovenian visual artist, based in and mainly operating from Ljubljana, with many of her works being presented abroad at international events in Croatia, Italy, United States and Austria. In 2017 she founded her own visual arts vehicle and brand Finer Side of Pop (stylized as Finer Side 0f Pop) – phrase coined by Serbian writer and art historian Marko Dabetić, and it became a title of subsequent monograph dedicated to Kazazić's work, which saw release in 2020. Currently very active within the artist community of Ljubljana, Kazazić also collaborates with designers (Nelizabeta, JSP Fashion), alternative music labels (such as Belgrade's 93DOT93) and is known locally for her engagement in cultural and civic activism, including work with refugees and volunteering during 2014 Southeast Europe floods in Obrenovac, Serbia. In 2015. she curated a public exhibition of urban artists for Ulična galerija, which utilized public spaces as exhibition sites. She was admitted into Ljubljana Fine Artists Society in 2021.

== Biography ==
Kazazić was born in 1972 in Belgrade. Her first academic choice were studies of architecture – she dropped out, but as she pointed out, it was drawing classes on weekends she attended while preparing for the entrance exam that made her realize she wanted to pursue career in visual arts. It was visits to US in her youth, among other things, that additionally informed her affinity towards pop art.

== Career ==
Active from the early 1990s (first exhibition took place in 1990 in Las Vegas), Kazazić started her first studio in 1994, in Ljubljana.

She holds a degree in fine arts, which she got at Arthouse – an art school in Ljubljana, in 2003.

In her student days, she shared a studio (dubbed M. I. K. S.) with fellow artist and partner at the time, Matjaž Stražar.

After her breakthrough series Shoes (Čevlji, 2001–2009), Kazazić primarily focuses on (and is mostly known by) extensive series of intimate portraits of friends (notably Portraits of Time), acquaintances, pop culture figures or even fictional characters (Pippi Longstocking being just one of them).

She mainly chooses independent ways of advancing her career as an artist, and is self-managed, relying on word of mouth and – with expansion of internet – presence on social networks rather than on any form of institutional support.

== Style and influences ==
Kazazić mainly works in the tradition of pop art. Her style has changed over time, but since around 2010, she established her trademark use of white space and vivid colors that at times are bordering on psychedelic art. Her art is often an open celebration of eroticism. Although she mainly keeps her work from being overtly political, there are often strong feminist messages present.

She mainly utilizes mixed technique in her work, combining watercolor, drawing and collage.

She cited Andy Warhol, Robert Rauschenberg and a wide variety of artists and pop culture figures as her personal influences.

== Exhibitions ==
Kazazić's work has been on display in Slovenia, Serbia, Croatia, Austria, Italy and US.
