= Irena Roterman-Konieczna =

Polish biochemist and researcher

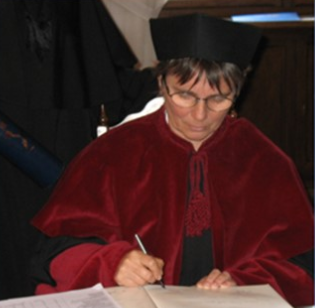
Irena Roterman-Konieczna in 2006.

Irena Roterman-Konieczna (Polish pronunciation: [iˈrɛ.na rɔtɛrman kɔɲɛt͡ʂna]; born 13 March 1950) is a Polish biochemist and a professor at the Jagiellonian University Medical College.

== Biography ==
Irena Roterman-Konieczna was born on 13 March 1950 in Kraków. She attended the Bartłomiej Nowodworski High School, where she passed matura in 1968. She received a master's degree in chemistry in 1973 at the Jagiellonian University, and her doctorate in 1985 at the Medical College there. Her Post Doc position was at Cornell University – Harold A. Scheraga group 1987-1989. Her postdoctoral degree (habilitation) was at Jagiellonian University – Medical College 1996. In 2005 she received the title of professor.

She has been the head of the Department of Bioinformatics and Telemedicine at the Jagiellonian University, and an editor in chief of the Bio-Algorithms and Med-Systems journal.

She is married to Leszek Konieczny, who is a Polish biochemist.

== Works ==
Irena Roterman-Konieczna is the author of numerous scientific studies on the structure and function of proteins and amyloids. In 2020, she was included in the group of "2%" or "160,000 most influential researchers in the world".

Her publications include:

- Simulations in Medicine : Computer-aided diagnostics and therapy. Irena Roterman-Konieczna. Berlin. 2020. ISBN 978-3-11-066721-9. OCLC 1153548491.
- Simulations in medicine : pre-clinical and clinical applications. Irena Roterman-Konieczna. Berlin. 2015. ISBN 978-3-11-040634-4. OCLC 945756581.
- Roterman-Konieczna, Irena (2012). Identification of Ligand Binding Site and Protein-Protein Interaction Area. Dordrecht: Springer. ISBN 978-94-007-5285-6. OCLC 829751666.
- Protein folding in silico : protein folding versus protein structure prediction. Irena Roterman-Konieczna. Philadelphia, Pa: Woodhead Pub. 2012. ISBN 978-1-908818-25-6. OCLC 847549847.
- Roterman-Konieczna, Irena (2009). Statistics by prescription. Kraków: Jagiellonian University Press. ISBN 978-83-233-2741-7. OCLC 797815860.
