= Irena Pfeiffer =

Polish composer, conductor and teacher (1912–1996)

Irena Pfeiffer (23 September 1912– 6 July 1996) was a Polish composer, conductor, and teacher.

== Personal life ==
Pfeiffer attended the State Teachers' College in Kraków and at the Władysław Żeleński Music School. She completed the state examination in music and singing at Katowice Conservatory and later studied composition under Artur Malawski and conducting under Walerian Bierdiajew from 1946 to 1952 at the Higher Music School in Kraków.

== Career ==
Her music teaching career started in 1938 at high schools and during this time, she conducted both female and male choirs. Pfeiffer toured in Poland, Yugoslavia, and Hungary, winning many prizes and awards in Poland. Two volumes of her work received a positive review from Music in Education, Volume 42 in 1978.
