= Irena Weissowa =

Polish painter (1888–1981)

Irena Weissowa (1 October 1888, in Łódź – 20 March 1981, in Kraków), better known as Aneri, was a Polish painter, best remembered for her landscapes, still lifes of floral designs, and stained glass mosaics. A graduate of the Jan Matejko Academy of Fine Arts, she was married to Wojciech Weiss.
