= Mining Museum Příbram =

Museum in Czech Republic

- Hornické muzeum Příbram

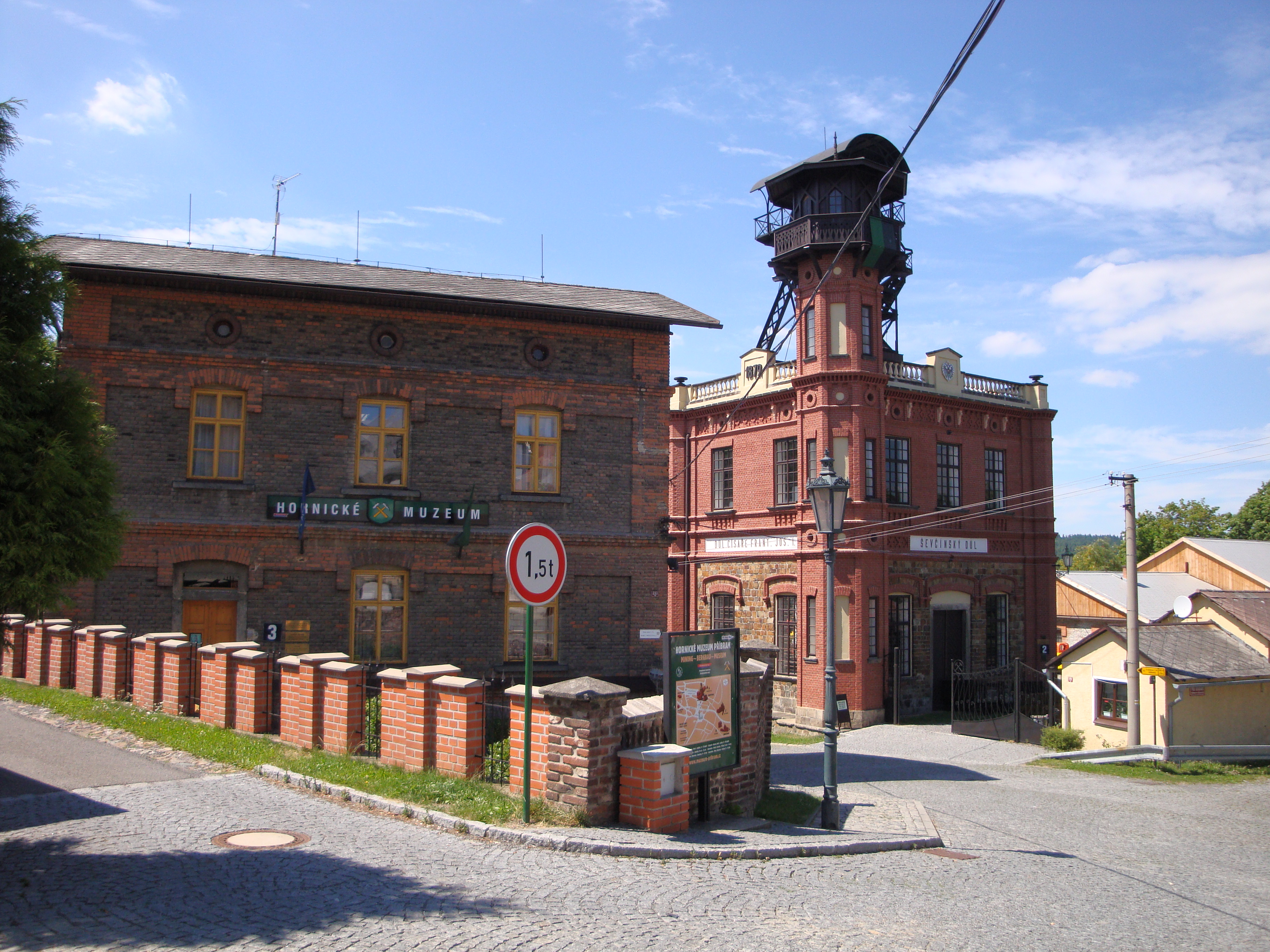
- The seat of Mining Museum Příbram
- Established: 1886
- Location: náměstí Hynka Kličky 293, Příbram, Czech Republic, 261 01
- Coordinates: 49°40′58.26″N 13°59′15.99″E
- Website: www.muzeum-pribram.cz

Mining Museum Příbram (Czech: Hornické muzeum Příbram) is a large open-air museum of mining with historical buildings and expositions of mining history and mineralogy. It is located in Příbram's Březové Hory quarter, former important Czech mining centre. It is one of the biggest museums in the Czech Republic. It was founded in 1886.

== History ==
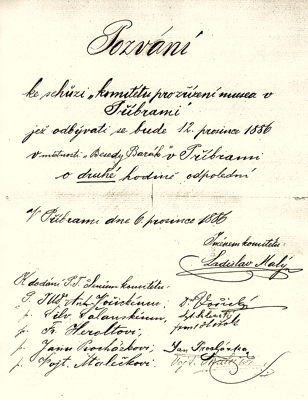
Invitation to a meeting of the "Committee for Foundation of Museum i Příbram", that took place under the chairmanship of Ladislav Malý in December 1886

The Mining Museum Příbram follows the tradition of two past museums founded in the 19th century. Part of the collections of the factory mining museum of Příbram's mining works, especially the collections of minerals, has been open to public already since 1852. Thanks to the school director Ladislav Malý, the Regional Museum in Příbram was founded on 12 December 1886. Since the early beginning, the exhibits depicting the mining history were kept there, from modern era objects to archaeological finds from Celtic times.

Although both institutions existed side by side for long decades, their condition was not promoted until the major change caused by the idea of Jiří Majer, director of the mining section of the National Technical Museum (NTM) in Prague. He asked to save the major mining structures in Příbram after their closure for the mining museum. The NTM took care of the factory museum collections and obtained the former office a dwelling building at the Ševčinský Shaft (now the mineralogical exposition) as the seat of its mining branch.

Since 1963 the museum has been included into the Regional Museum in Příbram.

More buildings were selected for the museum in the 1970s, but only a small part of the plans was carried out. The museum obtained the cáchovna (registration room) close to the Ševčinský Shaft, miner's cottage and later the Ševčinský Shaft itself. Two other mines planned to be included into the museum (the St. Adalbert Shaft and the St. Anne Shaft) however deteriorate, the St. Anne Shaft Gallows Frame is destroyed as well as the listed boiler-plant in the St. Adalbert Shaft.

The situation has been changing since the early 1990s. The Ševčinský Shaft and the St. Anne Shaft were rebuilt. Museum took care of the St. Anne Shaft with a steam winder from 1914 and it bought the St. Adalbert Shaft from the pre-World War II owners, who got the building back after the fall of communist regime in Czechoslovakia. After a reconstruction, the object was open for public in 2000.

Since 1998, the St. Prokop Adit is used for museum purposes including the mine train.

The museum is named the Mining Museum Příbram and it is funded by the Central Bohemian Region. Since the 1990s, the museum also holds several objects used for various non-mining original purposes outside of Příbram. Václav Havel initiated construction of the Vojna Memorial on a site of former communist labor camp.

== Expositions ==
Comparing the number of permanent expositions, the Mining Museum Příbram is the largest museum in the Czech Republic.

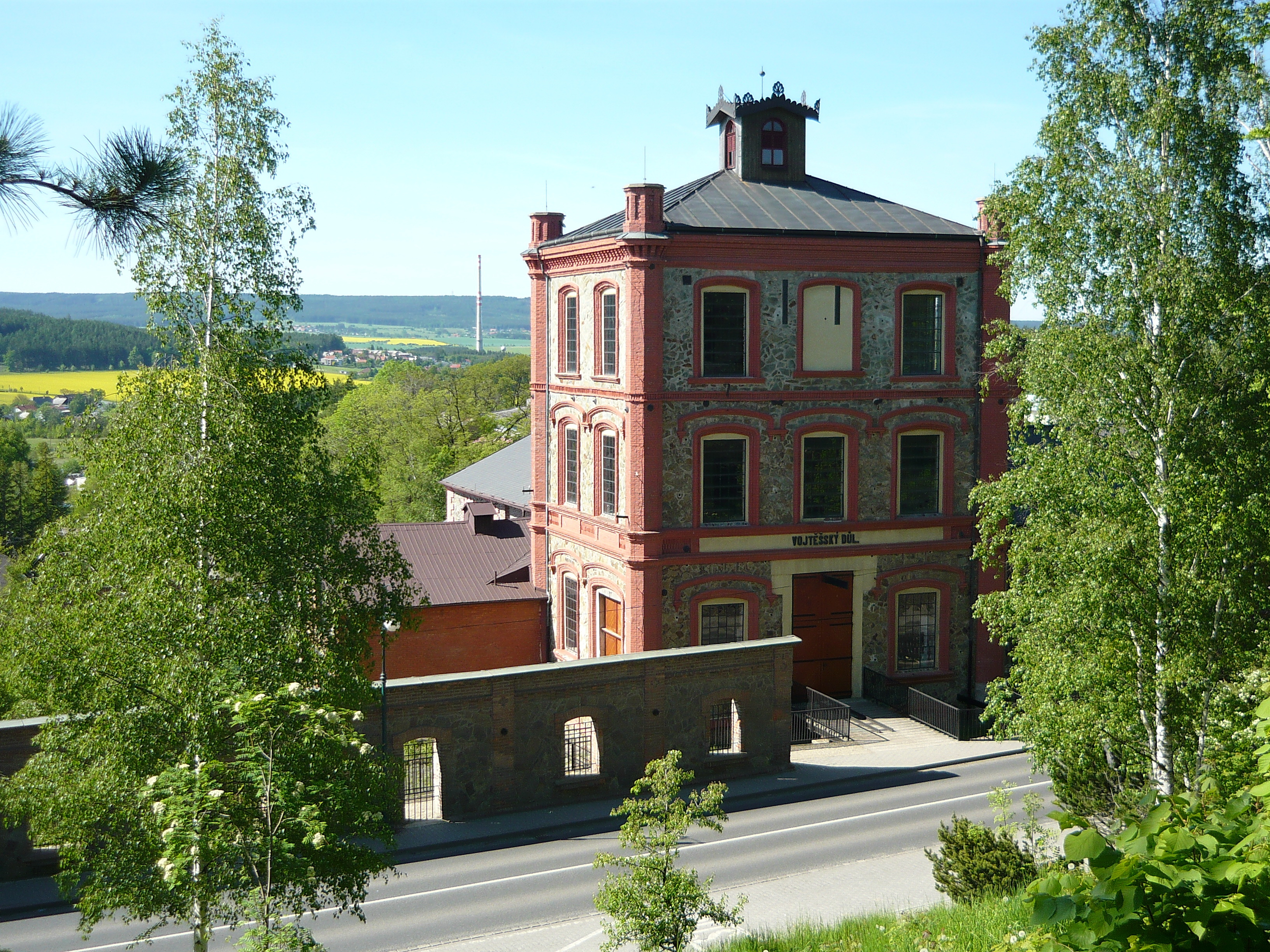
The St. Adalbert Shaft, building from the Mining Museum Příbram complex, site of the steam winder from 1889

- Ševčinský Shaft (Czech: Ševčinský důl) (building from 1879)
  - Engine room (mining supercharger), Gallows Frame
  - Show room
  - Cáchovna (registration room, 1880) – exposition of mining history
  - Driving wheel from mining lift used from the 16th till the 19th century, Middle Ages pulley and miners' bell tower
  - Exposition of mining technology since the 1950s
- Mineralogical exposition
- Miner's cottage from the 17th century
- St. Adalbert Shaft (Czech: Důl Vojtěch)
  - Steam winder "Breitfed-Daněk" from 1889
  - Exposition commemorating sinking to 1,000 m depth in 1875 – first time in the world
  - St. Mary Adit (Czech: Mariánská štola)
  - Gallows Frame
- St. Anne Shaft (Czech: Důl Anna)
  - Steam winder from 1914
  - St. Prokop Adit (Czech: Prokopská štola), mining train
  - St. Anne water tunnel (16th to 18th century)
- Water-wheel in the underground of the Drkolnov mine from the 19th century, diameter of 12.4 m

Museum runs also non-mining expositions including:

- Vojna Memorial near Příbram – prison used as a communist labour camp in the 1950s.
- Open-air museum in Vysoký Chlumec – countryside architecture
- The granary museum in Chotilsko-Prostřední Lhota – folklore of the central Bohemia
- Museum of gold in Nový Knín

== Publication and Science Activities ==
The museum issues the magazine Podbrdsko and casual publications. It also organises regular symposia Mining Příbram in Science and Technology.
