= Irena Andriukaitienė =

Lithuanian politician (born 1948)

Irena Andrukaitienė (born 6 September 1948 in Vilnius) is a Lithuanian politician. In 1990 she was among those who signed the Act of the Re-Establishment of the State of Lithuania.
