= Březové Hory =

- Town part
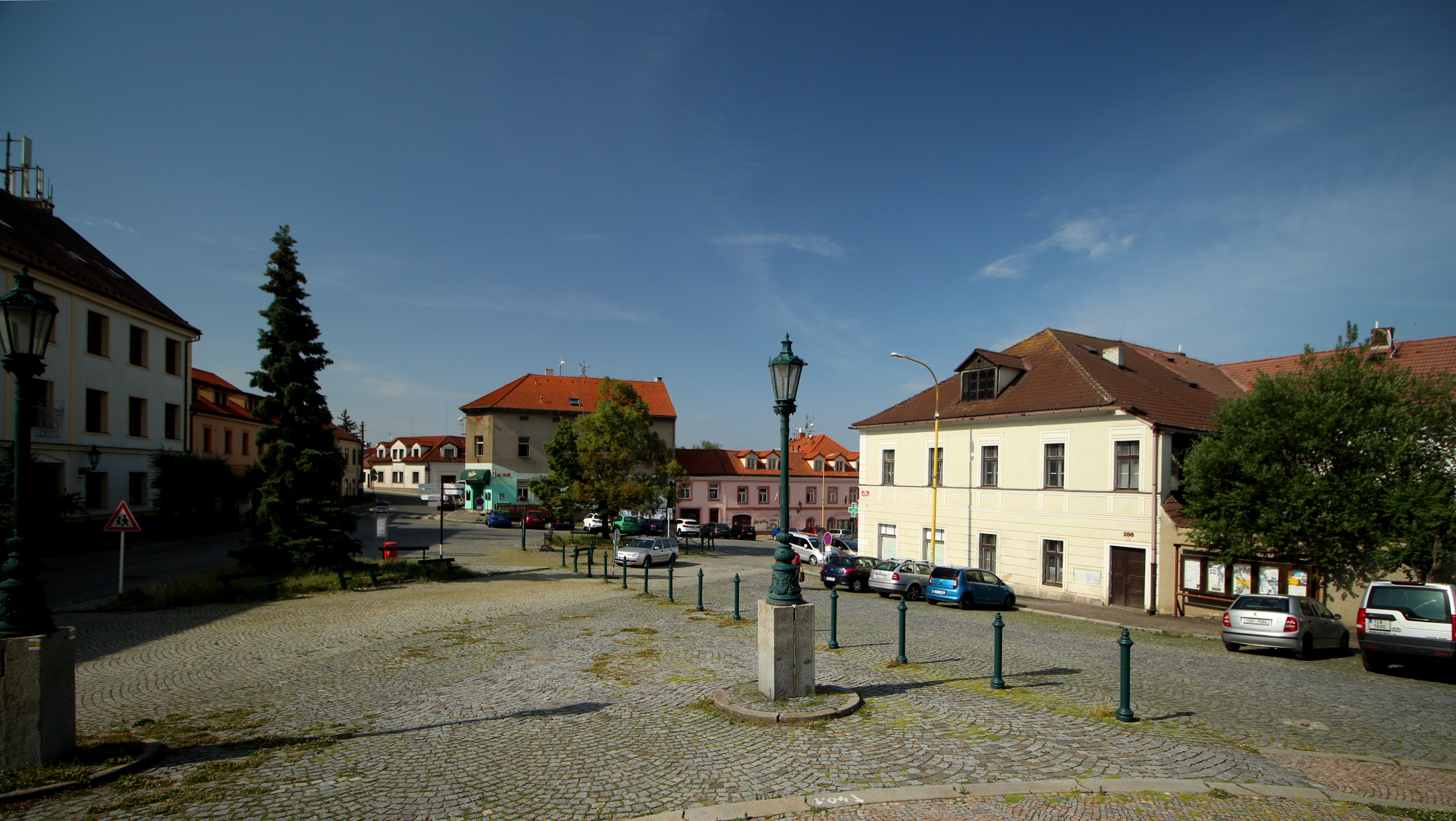
- J. A. Alis Square

- Location in the Czech Republic
- Coordinates: 49°41′18″N 13°59′25″E
- Country: Czech Republic
- Region: Central Bohemian
- District: Příbram
- Municipality: Příbram
- First mentioned: 1300
- Elevation: 545 m (1,788 ft)

Population (2021)
  - Total: 1,704
- Time zone: UTC+1 (CET)
  - Summer (DST): UTC+2 (CEST)
- Postal code: 261 01

Příbram VI-Březové Hory (until 1953 Březové Hory; German: Birkenberg) is a town part of Příbram in the Central Bohemian Region of the Czech Republic. Until 1953, it was a separate town. It is known as a former royal mining town.

== Etymology ==
The name literally means "Birch Mountains".

== Geography ==
The Litavka River partially forms the border with Podlesí.

== History ==
The first evidence of silver mining in Březové Hory dates from the 14th century. At the beginning of the 16th century a mining settlement was established near the silver-ore mines, it was promoted to a market town in the 18th century. It reached its greatest fame at the turn of the 18th and 19th centuries, when five underground mines were gradually open. The volume of mined silver then reached up to 97% of all mined silver in the Austro-Hungarian monarchy and Březové Hory became the main silver producer in Europe. This is one of the reasons why the town was promoted to a royal mining town on 20 April 1896 by Emperor Franz Joseph I.

Since the beginning of the 20th century there has been a gradual decline in mining, but thanks to the state subsidies mining continued until 1978. In 1953 Březové Hory became part of Příbram. After mining was terminated, several mining buildings were converted to Mining Museum Příbram. It is the largest mining museum in the Czech Republic.

== Cultural monuments ==
In Březové Hory there are many preserved mines and other buildings designated as the Czech cultural monuments, some of them are on the national cultural monument list.

- Miner's House
- Portal of Ševčiny transportation adit – national cultural monument
- Portal of Marie transportation adit – national cultural monument
- Mining Inspectorate
- Administrative building – Mine engineering
- Church of St. Procopius
- Mining office building, also called "Šichtamt"
- Ševčiny Mine – national cultural monument
- Anna Mine – national cultural monument
- Adalbert Mine – national cultural monument
- Church of St. Adalbert

== Gallery ==
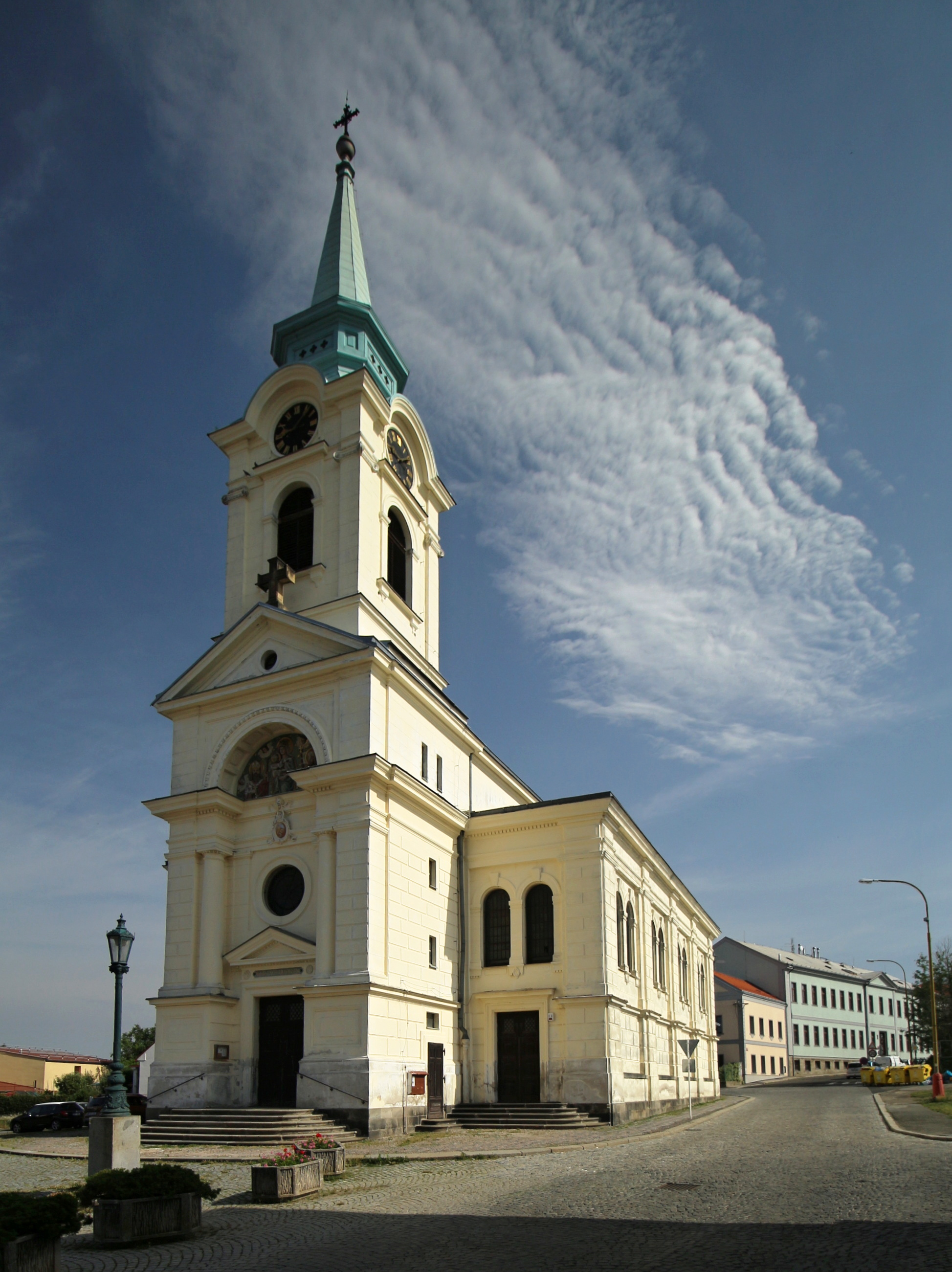
Church of St. Adalbert

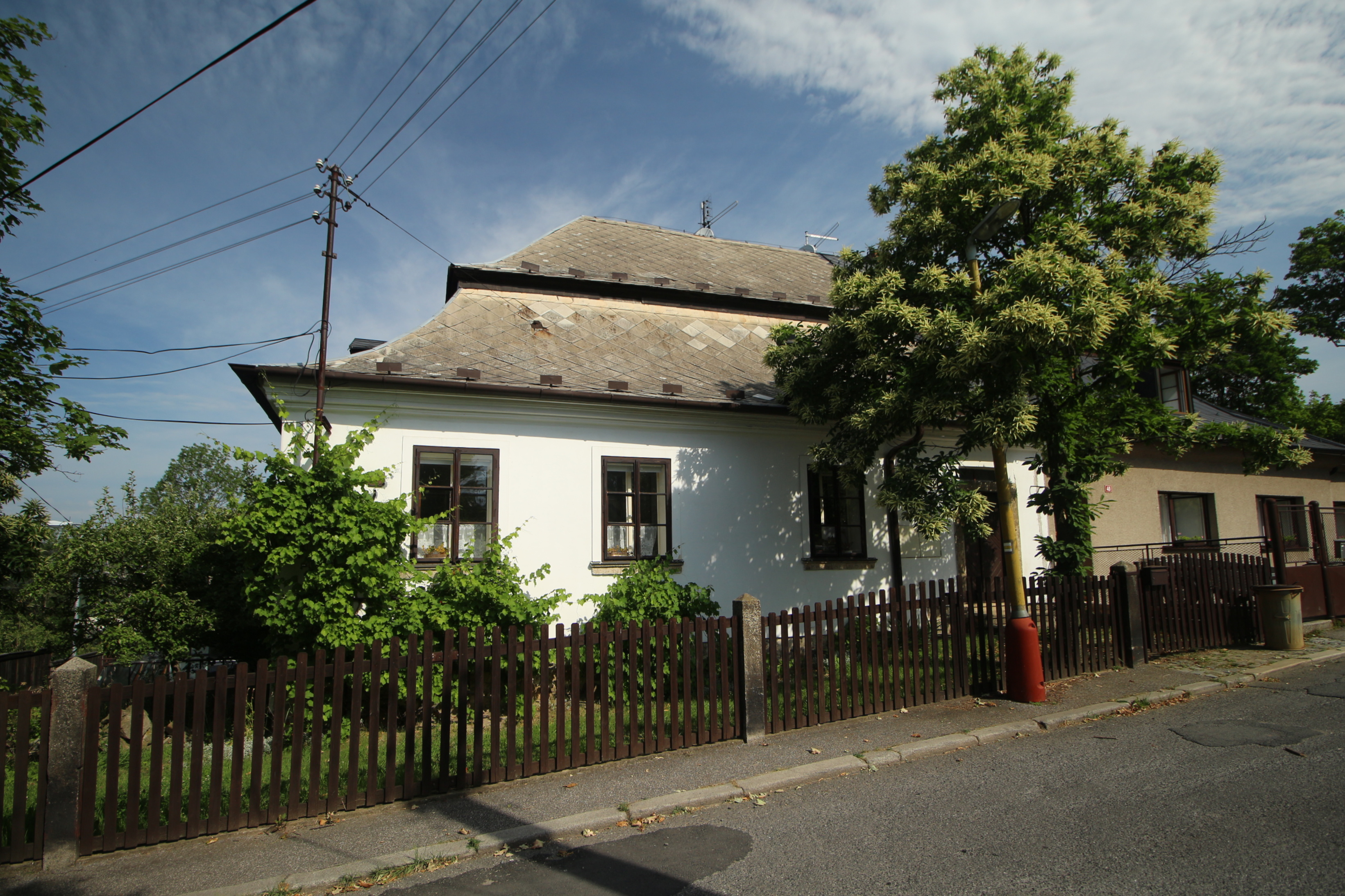
Mining office building "Šichtamt"

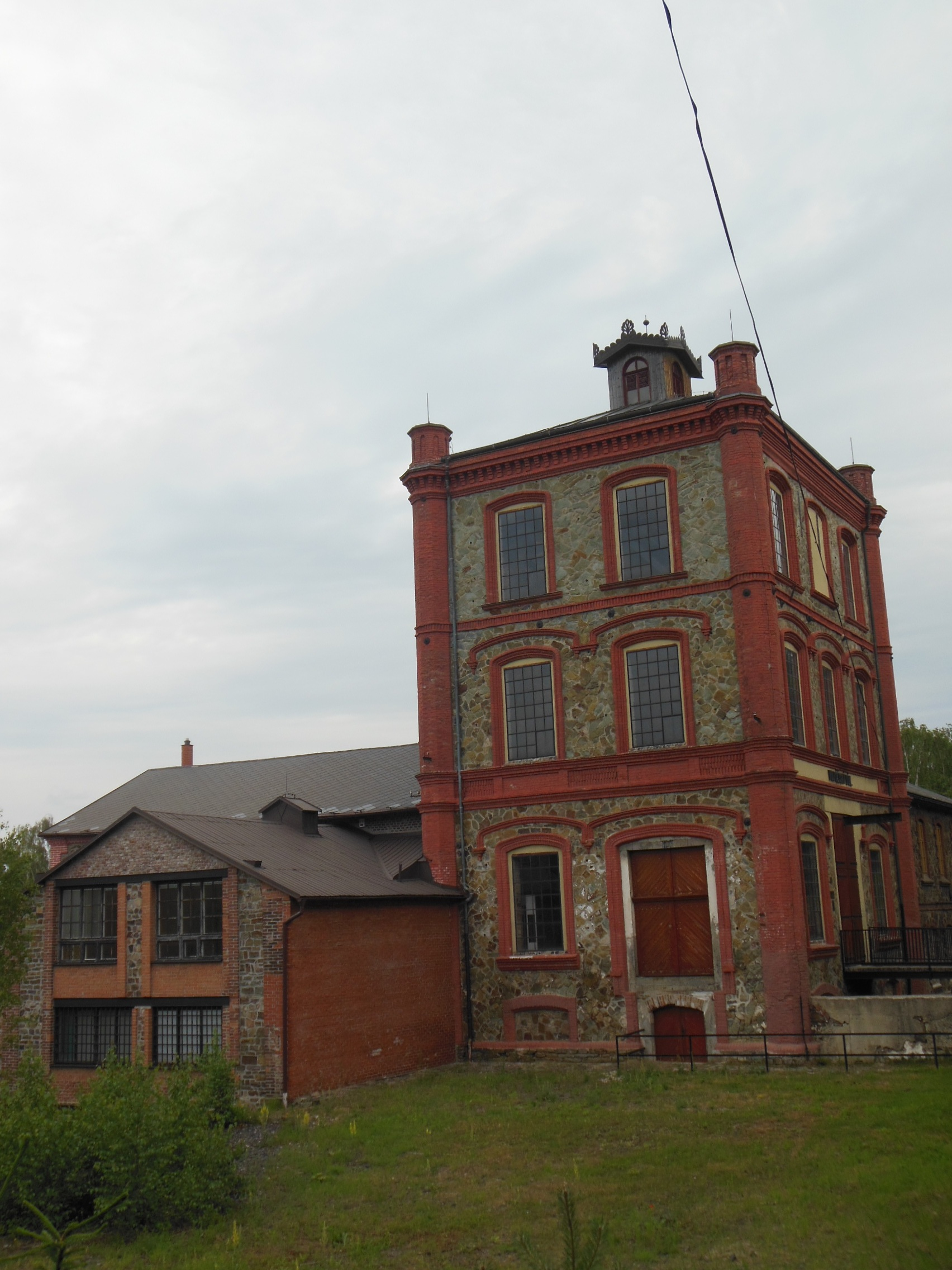
Adalbert Mine

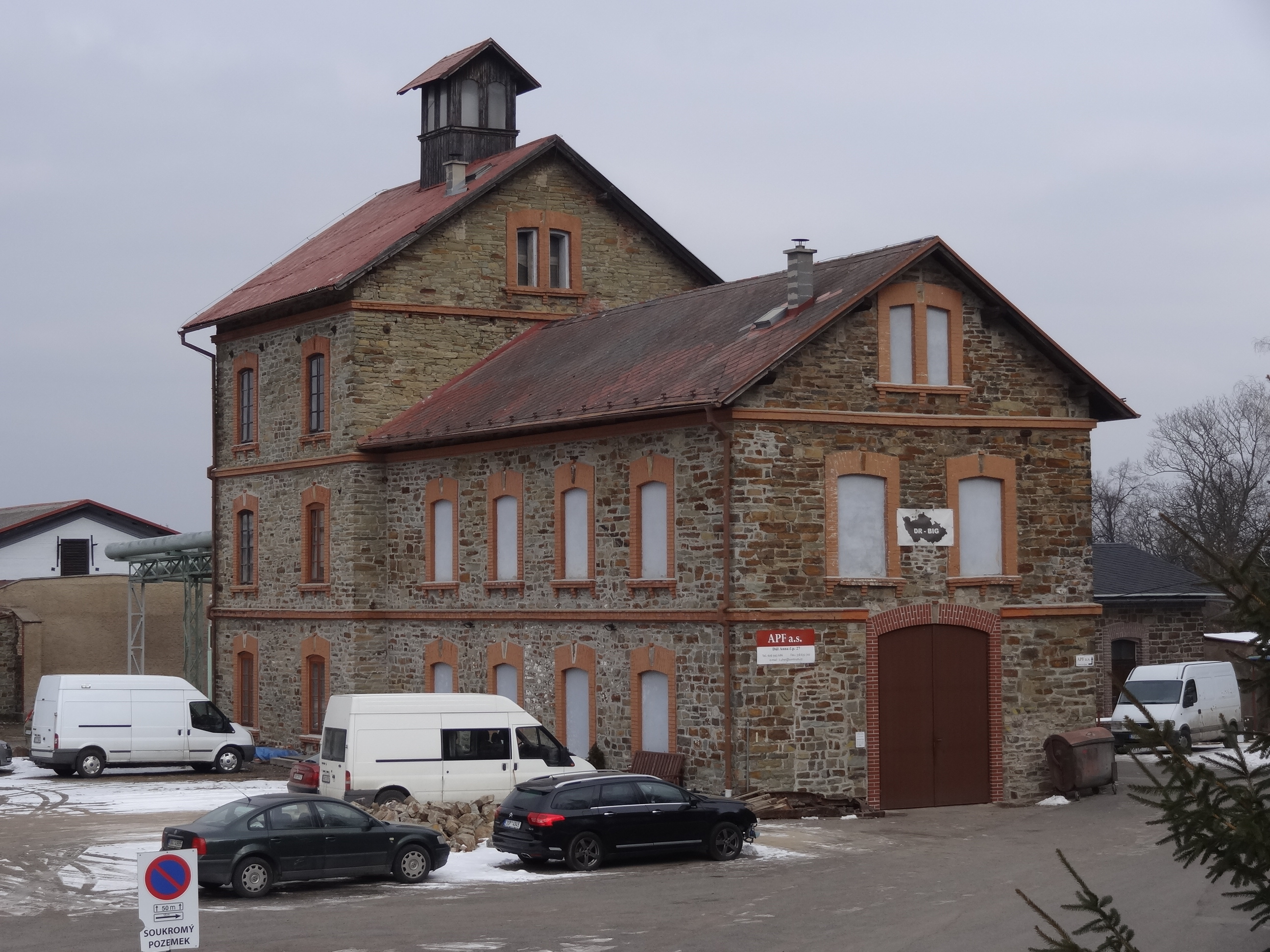
Anna Mine

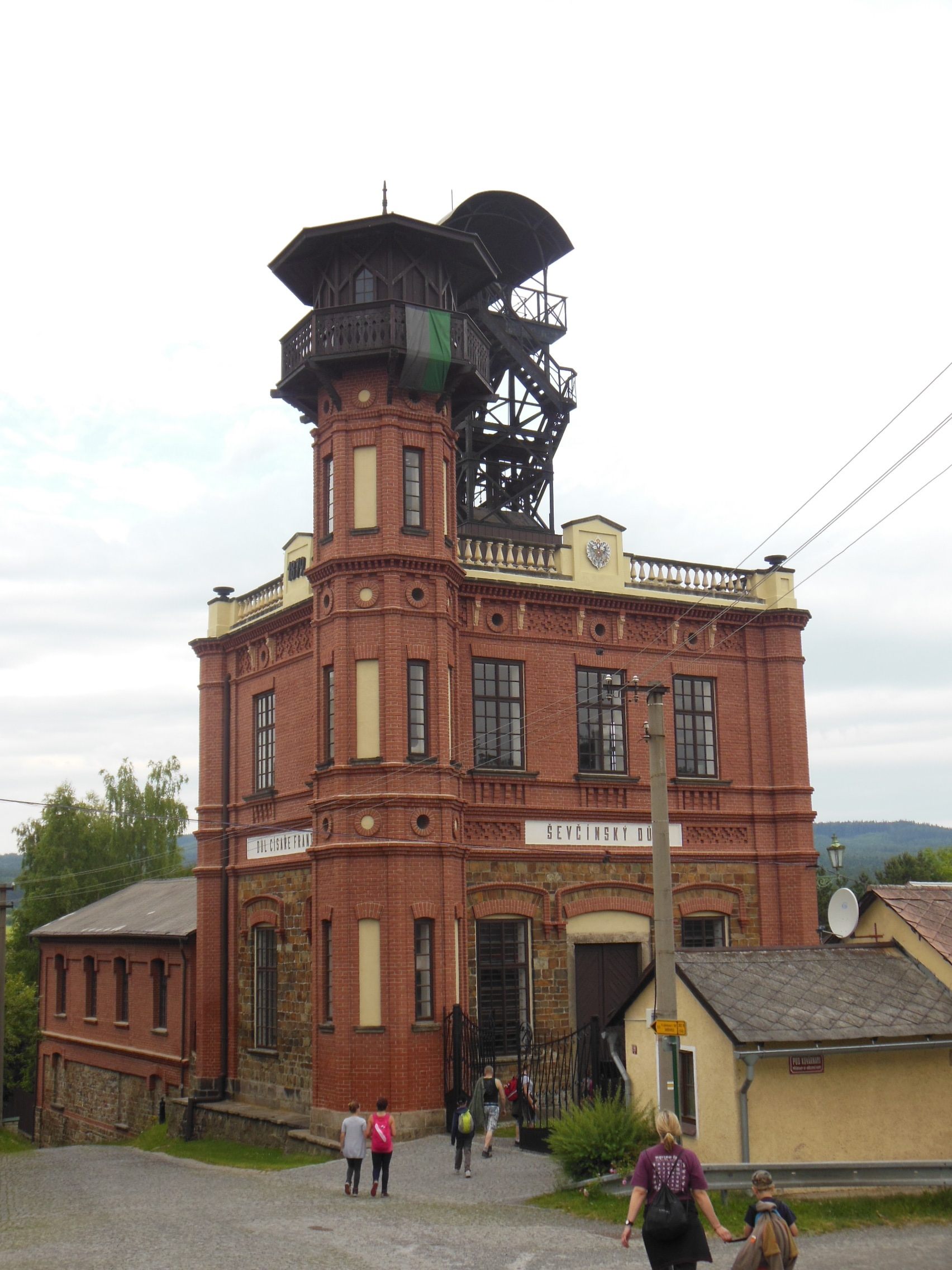
Ševčiny Mine

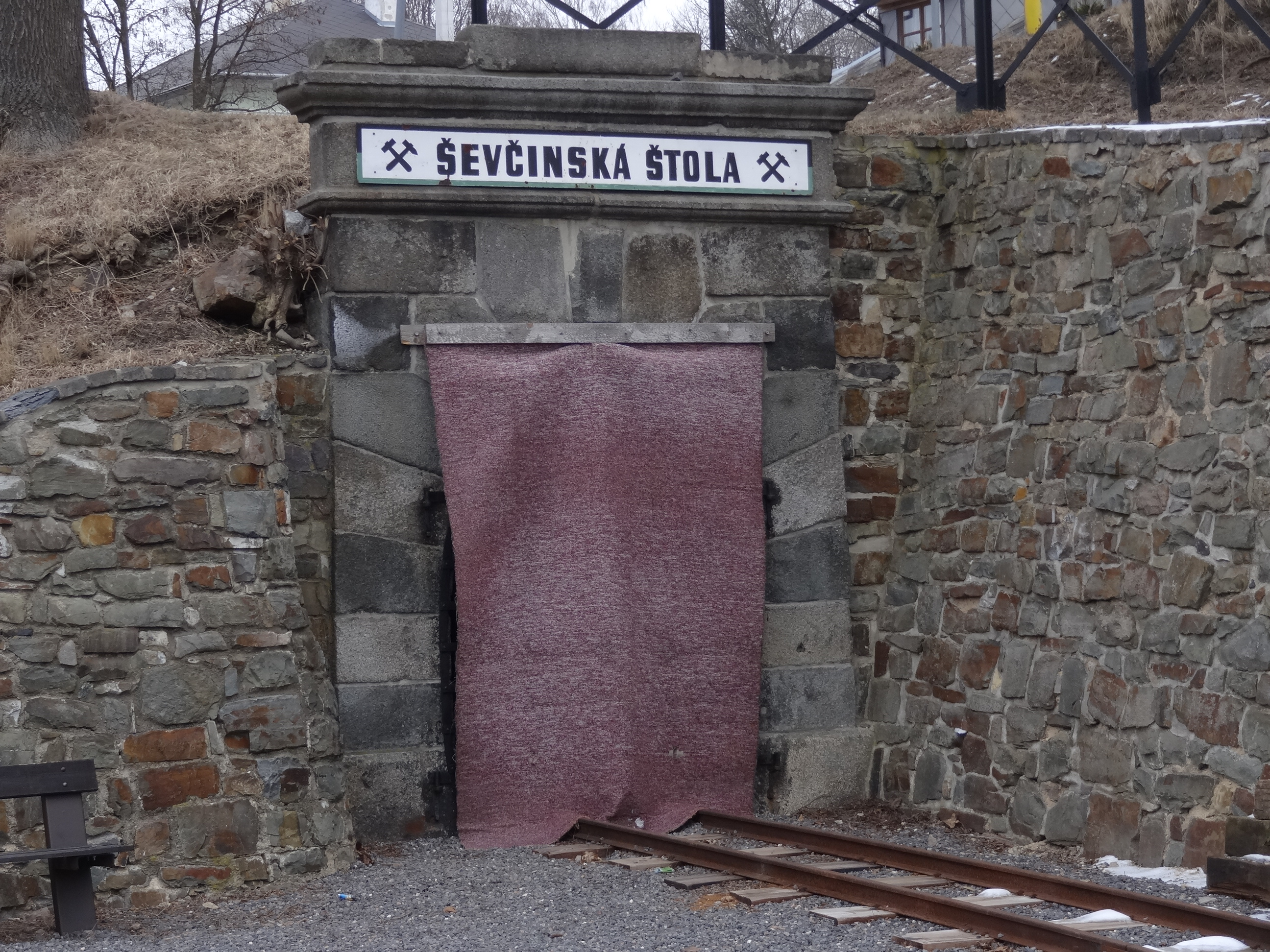
Portal of Ševčiny Adit

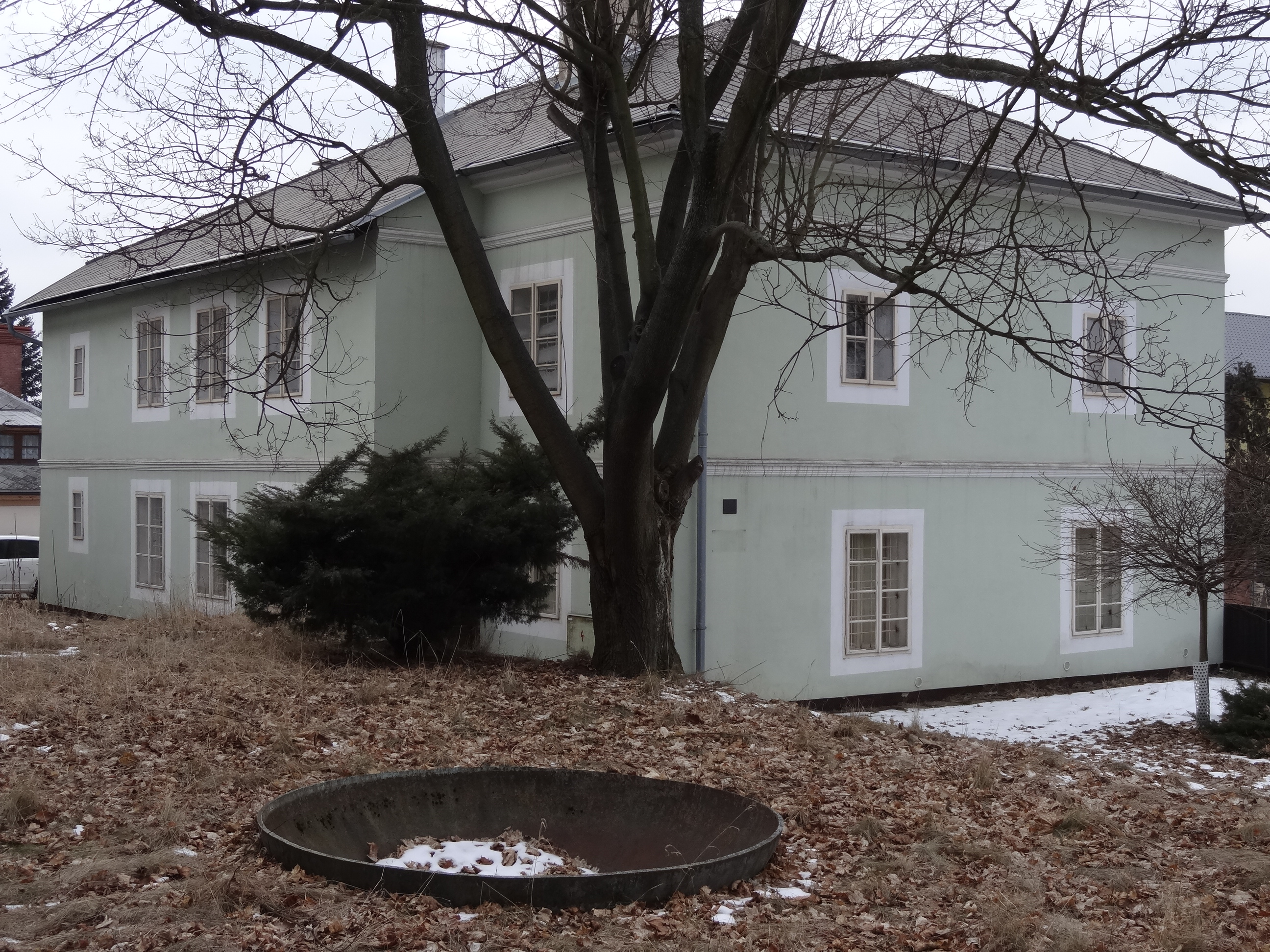
Engineering Building

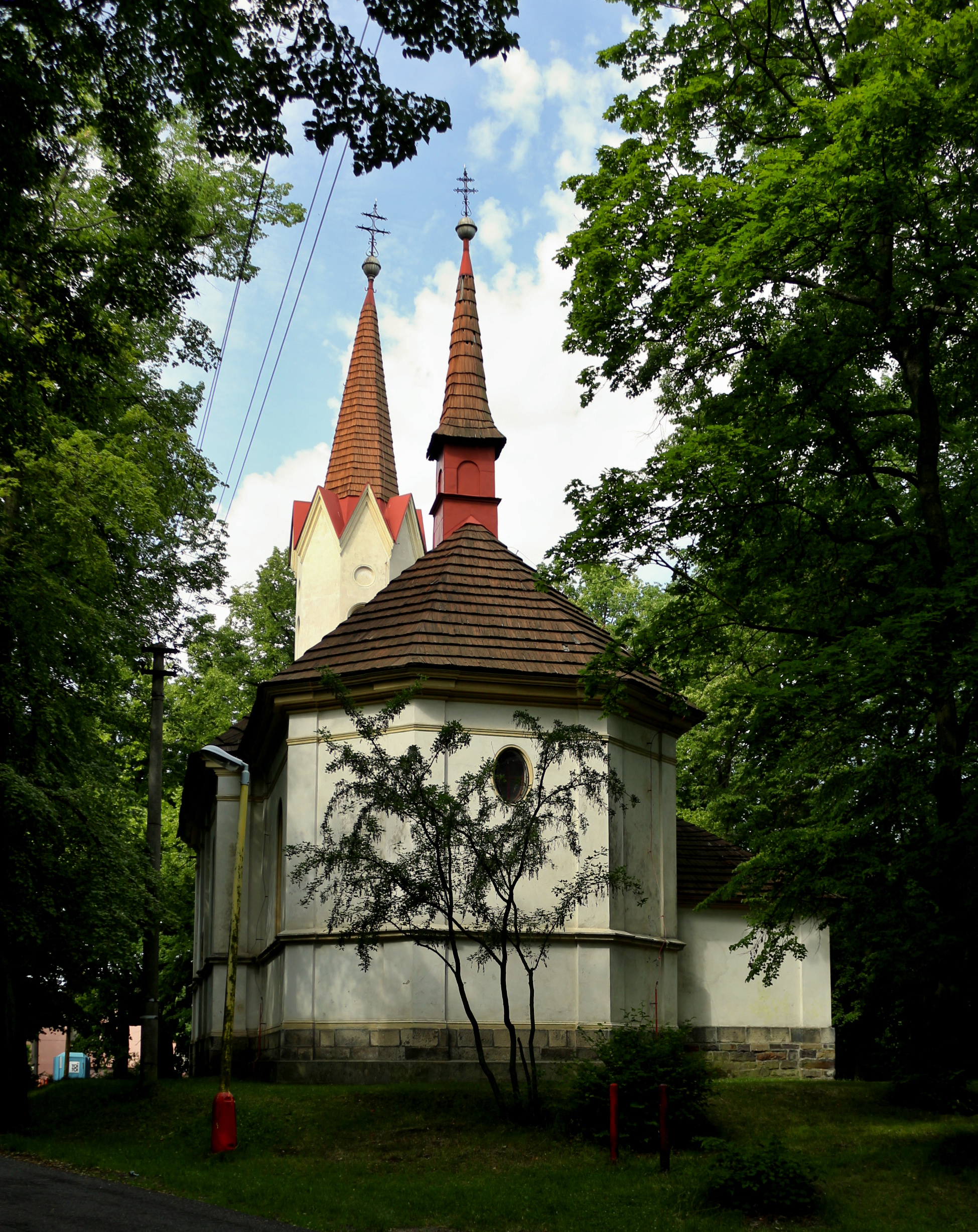
Church of St. Procopius

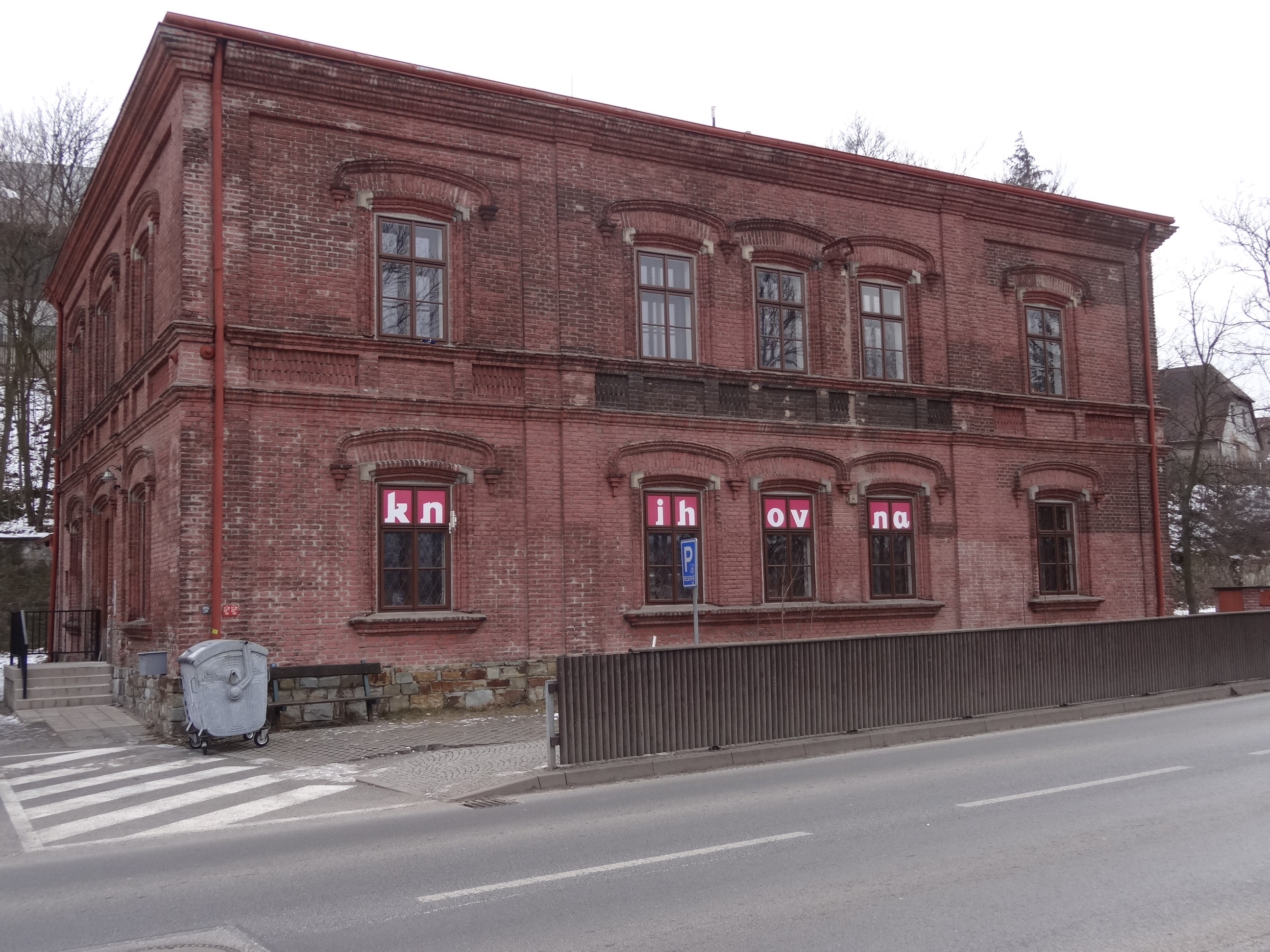
Mine Inspection Building
