= Sheridan (surname) =

Sheridan is an Irish surname. It is derived from the Irish Gaelic Ó Sirideáin 'descendant of Sirideán', a given name meaning 'to seek'. Originating in County Longford, the Sheridans were erenaghs of Granard, but in the County Cavan they served the O'Reillys.

== Notable Sheridans ==
=== A ===
- Aishling Sheridan (born 1996), Irish sportswoman
- Alan Sheridan (1934–2015), English author
- Alex Sheridan (born 1948), Scottish footballer
- Alison Sheridan, British archaeologist
- Amy Sheridan, American aviator
- Andrew Sheridan (born 1979), English rugby union footballer
- Andrew Sheridan (cricketer), Irish cricketer
- Ann Sheridan (1915–1967), American actress
- Arthur V. Sheridan (1888–1952), American engineer

=== B ===
- Beatriz Sheridan (1934–2006), Mexican actress and director
- Betsy Sheridan (1758–1837), Irish diarist
- Ben Sheridan (born 2009), Scottish actor
- Bill Sheridan (born 1959), American football coach
- Bill Sheridan (basketball) (1942–2020), American basketball coach
- Bob Sheridan (1944–2023), American boxing commentator
- Bradley Sheridan (born 1980), Australian basketball player
- Brian Sheridan, American Paralympic cyclist

=== C ===
- Carl A. Sheridan (1908–1989), American attorney
- Carl V. Sheridan (1925–1944), American soldier
- Caroline Henrietta Sheridan (1779–1851), English novelist
- Cathal Sheridan (disambiguation), multiple people
- Cecil Sheridan (1910–1980), Irish comedian
- Chris Sheridan (disambiguation), multiple people
- Cillian Sheridan (born 1989), Irish footballer
- Clare Sheridan (1885–1970), British sculptor
- Cosy Sheridan (born 1964), American singer-songwriter

=== D ===
- Dan Sheridan (1916–1963), Irish-American actor
- Dana Sheridan, American flute maker
- Danny Sheridan (1950–2016), American entertainment manager
- Darren Sheridan (born 1967), English footballer
- David Sheridan (disambiguation), multiple people
- Dick Sheridan (1941–2023), American football coach
- Dinah Sheridan (1920–2012), English-born actress
- Dixie Sheridan, American photojournalist
- Dorothy Sheridan (born 1948), British archivist

=== E ===
- Eamonn Sheridan (born 1989), Irish rugby union player
- Ed Sheridan (born 1957), American soccer player
- Eileen Sheridan (disambiguation), multiple people
- Eloise Sheridan (born 1985), Australian cricket umpire

=== F ===
- Frances Sheridan (1724–1766), Irish novelist and dramatist
- Frances Keith Sheridan (1812–1882), Australian teacher
- Frank Sheridan (disambiguation), multiple people

=== G ===
- Gail Sheridan (1916–1982), American actress
- George Sheridan (footballer) (1929–1986), English footballer
- George Sheridan (politician) (1840–1896), American politician
- Georgette Sheridan (born 1952), Canadian politician
- Greg Sheridan (born 1956), Australian journalist
- Guillermo Sheridan (born 1950), Mexican writer

=== H ===
- Harry Sheridan (born 2001), Irish rugby union footballer
- Henry Brinsley Sheridan (1820–1906), English politician
- Hugh Sheridan (born 1985), Australian actor
- Hugh Sheridan (boxer) (1920–2005), New Zealand boxer

=== J ===
- Jack Sheridan (disambiguation), multiple people
- Jake Sheridan (born 1986), English footballer
- James Sheridan (disambiguation), multiple people
- Jamey Sheridan (born 1951), American actor
- Janie Sheridan, New Zealand academic
- Jeff Sheridan (born 1948), American magician
- Jim Sheridan (born 1949), Irish film director
- Jim Sheridan (politician) (1952–2022), British politician
- Joe Sheridan (1914–2000), Irish politician
- Joe Sheridan (Gaelic footballer), Irish Gaelic footballer
- John Sheridan (disambiguation), multiple people
- Joseph Alfred Sheridan (1882–1964), Irish lawyer
- Juan Sheridan (1925–1969), Canadian football player

=== K ===
- Kailen Sheridan (born 1995), Canadian soccer player
- Kathy Sheridan, Irish journalist
- Katie Sheridan (born 1986), English actress
- Keith Sheridan (born 1971), Scottish cricketer
- Kelly Sheridan (born 1977), Canadian voice actor
- Kirsten Sheridan, Irish film director
- Kriss Sheridan (born 1989), Polish-American singer

=== L ===
- Lanto Sheridan (born 1988), British polo player
- Leisa Sheridan (born 1964), American actress
- Leo J. Sheridan (1897–1975), American ambassador
- Lionel Astor Sheridan (born 1927), American academic administrator
- Lisa Sheridan (1974–2019), American actress
- Liz Sheridan (1929–2022), American actress
- Louisa Henrietta Sheridan (1810–1841), English writer

=== M ===
- Malachy Sheridan (1966–2002), Irish bobsledder
- Margaret Sheridan (disambiguation), multiple people
- Mark Sheridan (1864–1918), English comedian
- Martin Sheridan (1881–1918), Irish-American athlete
- Mary Sheridan (1899–1978), English pediatrician
- Matt Sheridan (born 1977), Canadian football player
- Maurice Sheridan (born 1974), Irish Gaelic footballer
- Michael Sheridan (disambiguation), multiple people
- Mike Sheridan (born 1991), Danish music producer
- Mikkayla Sheridan (born 1995), Australian swimmer
- Monica Sheridan (1912–1993), Irish chef

=== N ===
- Ned Sheridan (1842–1923), Australian cricketer
- Neill Sheridan (1921–2015), American baseball player
- Niall Sheridan (1912–1998), Irish poet
- Nick Sheridan (born 1988), American football coach
- Nicolette Fay Sheridan, New Zealand academic
- Nicollette Sheridan (born 1963), British actress
- Noel Sheridan (1936–2006), Irish painter

=== P ===
- Pat Sheridan (born 1957), American baseball player
- Patrick Sheridan (1922–2011), American prelate
- Patrick Sheridan (Bishop of Cloyne) (1638–1682), Irish bishop
- Peter Sheridan (disambiguation), multiple people
- Philip Sheridan (1831–1888), American general

=== R ===
- Red Sheridan (1896–1975), American baseball player
- Richard Sheridan (disambiguation), multiple people
- Rob Sheridan (born 1979), American graphic designer
- Roberta Sheridan (1864–1918), American teacher
- Rondell Sheridan (born 1958), American actor
- Ryan Sheridan (disambiguation), multiple people

=== S ===
- Sara Sheridan (born 1968), Scottish activist
- Serena Sheridan (born 1985), New Zealand cyclist
- Sol N. Sheridan (1858–1936), American historian
- Sonia Sheridan (1925–2021), American artist
- Susan Sheridan (1947–2015), English voice actress
- Sybil Sheridan (born 1953), British writer

=== T ===
- Taylor Sheridan (born 1970), American screenwriter
- Thomas Sheridan (disambiguation), multiple people
- Tony Sheridan (disambiguation), multiple people
- Tye Sheridan (born 1996), American actor

=== W ===
- Walter Sheridan (1925–1995), American investigator
- Wes Sheridan (born 1960), Canadian politician
- Will Sheridan (born 1985), American basketball player
- William Sheridan (disambiguation), multiple people

=== Z ===
- Zoe Sheridan (born 1968), Australian television presenter

== Fictional characters ==
- Eve Sheridan, a character in the sitcom E/R
- Jack Sheridan, played by Martin Henderson, a main character in the Netflix dramatic series Virgin River
- John Sheridan (Babylon 5), a lead character on the TV series
- Lisa Sheridan, main antagonist of the 2009 film Obsessed
- Mark Sheridan, played by Wesley Snipes, as the fugitive who is chased in the 1998 film U.S. Marshals
- Marriane Sheridan, character in the Irish TV series Normal People, based on the novel Normal People
- Park Sheridan, a book character from the novel Eleanor & Park
- Donna Sheridan and Sophie Sheridan, main characters in the musical Mamma Mia! (musical) and the movie Mamma Mia! (film)

== See also ==
- Sheridan (disambiguation), a disambiguation page for "Sheridan"
- General Sheridan (disambiguation), a disambiguation page for Generals surnamed "Sheridan"
- Judge Sheridan (disambiguation), a disambiguation page for Judges surnamed "Sheridan"
- Senator Sheridan (disambiguation), a disambiguation page for Senators surnamed "Sheridan"
