= Sheridan (given name) =

Sheridan is a unisex given name of Irish origin.

== Men ==
- Sheridan Anderson (1936–1984), American cartoonist, fly fisherman, outdoorsman, illustrator, author, and sign painter
- Sheridan Barnett (born 1951), British fashion designer
- Sheridan Coakley, British interior designer
- Sheridan Comerate (1928–1973), American actor
- Sheridan Delépine (1855–1921), Swiss bacteriologist and pathologist
- Sheridan Downey (1884–1961), American lawyer and politician
- Sheridan Gibney (1903–1988), American writer and producer
- Sheridan Gilley (born 1945), Australian author and historian
- Sheridan Grosvenor (1978–2021), Barbadian footballer
- Sheridan Hamilton-Temple-Blackwood, 5th Marquess of Dufferin and Ava (1938–1988), British patron of the arts
- Sheridan N. Hegland, American politician
- Sheridan Lawrence (1870–1952), Canadian pioneer, farmer, rancher and judge
- Sheridan Le Fanu (1814–1873), Irish writer
- Sheridan F. Master (1869–1927), American politician
- Sheridan Ming (born 1965), Bermudian cricketer
- Sheridan Morais (born 1985), South African motorcycle racer
- Sheridan Morley (1941–2007), English author, biographer, critic and broadcaster
- Sheridan Peterson (1926–2021), American criminal
- Sheridan Raynor (1934–2011), Bermudian cricketer
- Sheridan Russell (1900–1991), British cellist, hospital social worker, and patron of the arts
- Sheridan Shook (d. 1899), American businessman and tax collector
- Sheridan Simove, British entertainer, author, and entrepreneur
- Sheridan Snyder (born 1936), American entrepreneur, venture capitalist, and philanthropist
- Sheridan Titman (born 1954), American professor
- Sheridan Tongue, British television and film music composer

== Women ==
- Sheridan Burge-Lopez (born 1970), Australian swimmer
- Sheridan Fenwick, American clinical psychologist
- Sheridan Gallagher (born 2002), Australian professional rugby league footballer
- Sheridan Jobbins (born 1960), Australian journalist, television presenter, and screenwriter
- Sheridan Kates, British politician
- Sheridan Keith (born 1942), New Zealand author, artist, broadcaster and curator
- Sheridan Miyamoto, American forensic nurse practitioner and researcher
- Sheridan Mortlock (born 2000), Australian model and host
- Sheridan Scott, Canadian commissioner of competition
- Sheridan Smith (born 1981), English actress and singer
- Sheridan Ure, Scottish actress, yoga teacher, and wife Midge Ure
- Sheridan Winn, British journalist and novelist

== See also ==
- Sheridan (surname)
- Sheridan (disambiguation)
- Sherridan Kirk
- Sheridon Baptiste
- Sheridon Gumbs
- Sherriden May
