= Billy Sheridan =

Billy Sheridan may refer to:

- Billy Sheridan, DJ on WSAN and WEEX
- Billy Sheridan (wrestling coach), see Gerald Leeman

== See also ==
- Bill Sheridan, American football coach
- William Sheridan (disambiguation)
