= Sheridan =

Sheridan often refers to:

- Philip Sheridan (1831–1888), U.S. Army general after whom the Sheridan tank is named
- Richard Brinsley Sheridan (1751–1816), Irish playwright (The Rivals), poet and politician
- Sheridan Smith (born 1981), English actress and singer

Sheridan may also refer to:

== Other people ==
- Sheridan (surname)
- Sheridan (given name)

== Fictional characters ==
- John, Anna and David Sheridan, characters in Babylon 5
- Sheridan Bucket, an unseen character in Keeping Up Appearances
- Sheridan Crane, in the NBC soap opera Passions
- Donna and Sophie Sheridan, in Mamma Mia!
- Sheridan Whiteside, in The Man Who Came to Dinner
- Terry Sheridan, a supporting character in Lara Croft: Tomb Raider – The Cradle of Life

== Places ==
=== United Kingdom ===
- Sheridan, County Fermanagh, a townland in County Fermanagh, Northern Ireland
- Sheridan, County Tyrone, a townland in County Tyrone, Northern Ireland

=== United States ===
- Sheridan, Arkansas
- Sheridan, California
- Sheridan, Colorado
- Sheridan, Illinois
- Sheridan, Indiana
- Sheridan County, Kansas
- Sheridan, Michigan
- Sheridan, Minneapolis
- Sheridan, Missouri
- Sheridan, Montana
- Sheridan County, Montana
- Sheridan County, Nebraska
- Sheridan, Nevada
- Sheridan, New York
- Sheridan County, North Dakota
- Sheridan, Oregon
- Sheridan, South Dakota
- Sheridan, Texas
- Sheridan, Washington
- Sheridan, West Virginia
- Sheridan, Wisconsin, Dunn County
- Sheridan, Waupaca County, Wisconsin
- Sheridan, Wyoming
- Sheridan County, Wyoming
- Sheridan station (CTA), Chicago, Illinois
- Sheridan Circle, a traffic circle in Washington, D.C.

== Other uses ==
- Sheridan (album), by Sheridan Smith, 2017
- Sheridan (automobile), a 1920s brand of American automobile
- Sheridan (brand), an Australian textile brand
- Sheridan College, in Ontario, Canada
- Sheridan College (Wyoming), in the U.S.
- M551 Sheridan, an American light tank
- USS Sheridan, a U.S. Navy ship
- Sheridan, the name of USS Stettin after she was decommissioned
- Sheridan's, an alcoholic drink
- "Sheridan" (The Bear)," an episode of The Bear TV series

== See also ==
- Sheridan High School (disambiguation)
- Fort Sheridan, Illinois
  - Fort Sheridan station
- Mount Sheridan, Yellowstone National Park, Wyoming
- Sheridan v. United States, 1988 U.S. Supreme Court case
