= William Sheridan =

William Sheridan or Will Sheridan may refer to:

- William C. R. Sheridan (1917–2005), American Episcopalian bishop of Northern Indiana
- William Sheridan (bishop of Kilmore and Ardagh) (c. 1635–1711), Irish clergyman
- William Sheridan (politician) (1858–1931), Australian politician
- William E. Sheridan (1839-1887), American actor
- Will Sheridan (born 1985), American basketball player
- Will Sheridan (cricketer) (born 1987), Australian cricketer
- Bill Sheridan, American football coach
- Bill Sheridan (basketball) (1942–2020), American basketball player and coach

== See also ==
- Billy Sheridan (disambiguation)
- Sheridan (disambiguation)
