= Michael Sheridan =

Michael or Mike Sheridan may refer to:

- Michael Sheridan (musician), Australian musician
- Michael Sheridan (Irish politician) (1896–1970), member of Fianna Fáil party
- Michael Henry Sheridan (1912–1976), U.S. federal judge
- Michael John Sheridan (1945–2022), American Roman Catholic bishop
- Michael J. Sheridan (born 1958), auto worker and former Democratic member of the Wisconsin State Assembly
- Michael Joseph Sheridan, known as Joe Sheridan (1914–2000), Irish independent politician
- Michael K. Sheridan (born 1934), U.S. Marine Corps general
- Mike Sheridan (born 1991), Danish musician
- Michael Sheridan, British journalist and author of ‘'The Gate to China: A New History of the People’s Republic and Hong Kong’'
