= Women's Army Corps =

US Army's women's branch (1942–1978)

- Branch insignia of the Women's Army Corps, depicting the head of Athena
- Active: 15 May 1942–20 October 1978
- Country: United States of America
- Branch: United States Army
- Home station: Fort McClellan, Alabama
- Branch colors: Mosstone Green and Old Gold Piping
- Engagements: World War II; Korean War; Vietnam War

Insignia
- US Women's Army Auxiliary Corps Officer Branch Insignia AKA "Walking Buzzard"

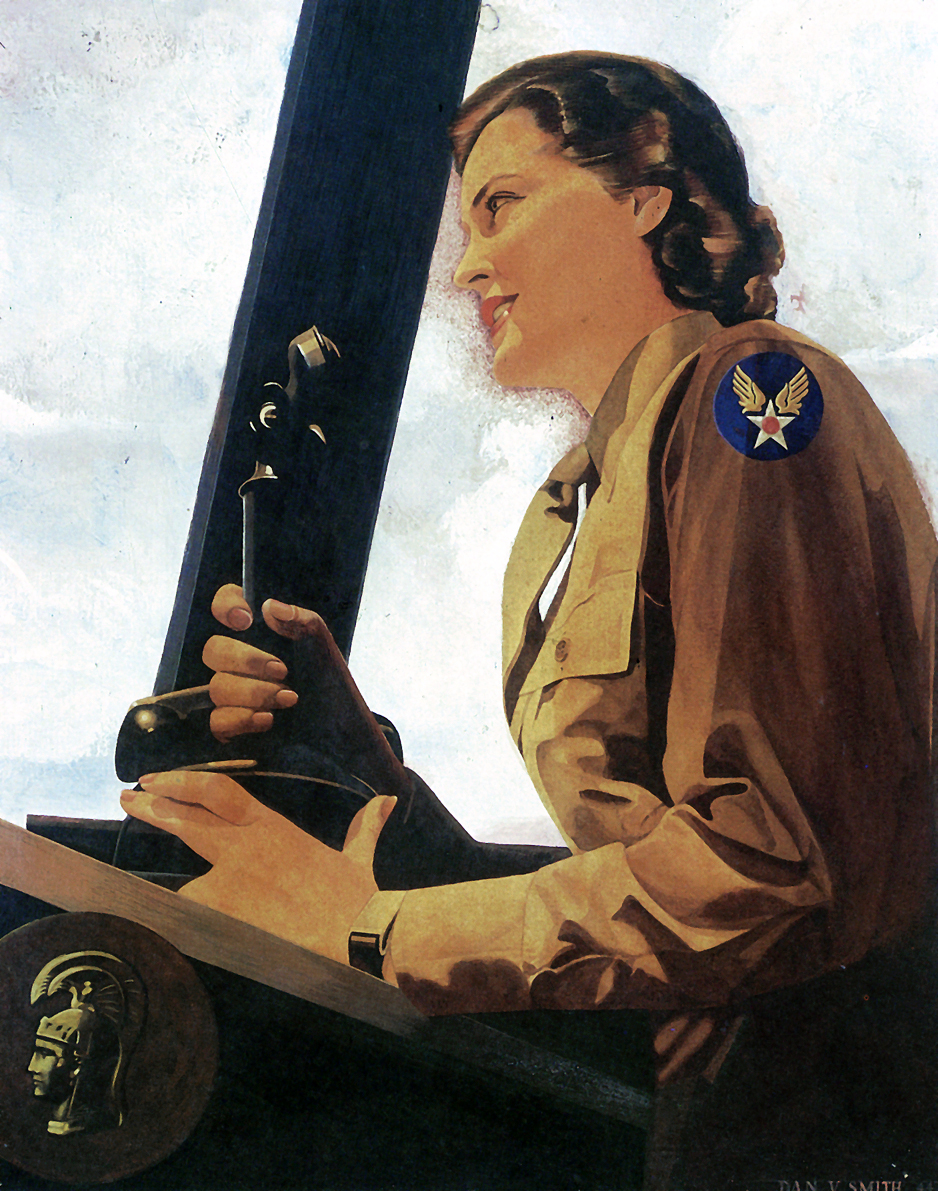
WAC Air Controller painting by Dan V. Smith, 1943

The Women's Army Corps (WAC; /wæk/) was the women's branch of the United States Army. It was created as an auxiliary unit, the Women's Army Auxiliary Corps (WAAC), on 15 May 1942, and converted to an active duty status in the Army of the United States as the WAC on 1 July 1943. Its first director was Colonel Oveta Culp Hobby. The WAC was disbanded on 20 October 1978, and all WAC units were integrated with male units.

== History ==
=== World War I ===
During World War I, the American Expeditionary Force was experiencing a manpower shortage. And various army officials, like General Pershing saw women as a solution. Women were hired as contract workers - as telegraph operations, drivers and for administrative duties. There was much criticism of how unorganized the women were, especially in comparison to the British Women's Auxiliary Army Corps. In August of 1918, Maj. Gen. James G. Harbord proposed recruiting 5,000 women and establishing a women's service corps as part of the Army Service Corps. The War Department responded that it was not feasible, but did loosen rules on hiring women for civilian employment. Similar proposals were sent by the commanders of nearly all the Army support branches. The Army was frustrated by the lack of Congressional support, especially since the Navy was enlisting female Yeomen at the time with full military status.

=== Interwar years ===
In 1920, the army created the Director of Women's Services under the Chief of Staff for Personnel and named Anita Phipps to the position. The position served mainly as liaison between the army and the families of servicemen. Phipps drew up plans to create a women’s organization within the army. She did research on the Navy and British women’s organizations during World War I. Phipps sent questionnaires to all corps areas and territorial departments and found that they felt a wartime army would need female clerks, secretaries, telephone operators, laundry workers, cooks, janitors, drivers, messengers, seamstresses and laborers. She would leave the position in 1931. The War Department stated that women in the army were not currently needed and wouldn’t be unless there was a major emergency.

At the same time, the army appointed a chief planner for a women’s corp in 1928 - Major Everett S. Hughes. He slowly gained the attention of Rep. Edith Nourse Rogers of Massachusetts. He too produced a plan that was shelved.

On 1 September 1939, Gen. George C. Marshall asked for a plan from the G-1 to study integrating women into the army, but with the caveat that women must not be given full military status and it was suggested the Civilian Conservation Corps would be the ideal model. The CCC was a uniformed military style organization, with grades of rank, under the orders of Army officers, in the Army's chain of command and under War Department regulations. The plan - like the Phipps and Hughes plans was quietly put away.

=== First steps ===
In the spring of 1941, Edith Nourse Rogers, a member of the U.S. House of Representatives from Massachusetts's 5th congressional district, informed then Chief of Staff of the Army General George C. Marshall that she intended to introduce a bill to create an all-female military branch. Within one month, her idea was accepted and the issue of the bill (H.R. 4906) planned for by the U.S. Department of War. The motives of the planners were made clear in a staff memorandum from the Assistant Chief of Staff, G-1, who wrote:

Congresswoman Edith Nourse Rogers has been determined for some time to introduce a bill to provide a women's organization in the Army. We have succeeded in stopping her on the promise that we are studying the same thing, and will permit her to introduce a bill which will meet with War Department approval.

Mrs. Roosevelt also seems to have a plan.

The sole purpose of this study is to permit the organization of a women's force along lines which meet with War Department approval, so that when it is forced upon us, as it undoubtedly will be, we shall be able to run it our way.

Initially, Colonel James Taylor and Major Robert W. Berry planned for women to be inducted into the army as civilians into a branch called the Women's Army Auxiliary Force (WAAF), in order to avoid repeating errors made during World War I. Their plan stated,

The War Department initially made no provision for the use of women in the last war with the exception of the Army Nurse Corps... However, the services of women were found to be so necessary overseas and in posts, camps and bureaus in the United States that before the World War was over, a large group of women were serving with the Army in unorganized and uncoordinated groups, hastily and inefficiently recruited, under little if any discipline, and with no military status or recognition.

The WAAF was later renamed as the Women's Army Auxiliary Corps (WAAC), to more closely match the British World War I organization.

=== Statutory origin ===
The first authorized woman's organization, other than the Army Nurse Corp., in the history of the United States was the woman's Army Auxiliary Corp, created by an Act of Congress May 14, 1942, PL 554, 77th Congress and established by executive order of the President the following day. The Act stated that the WAAC was "with" the Army rather than "in" the Army. According to the Army Officer's Guide of the time, "{to} all intents and purposes it functions much like any other branch of the service, with certain differences, however, concerning benefits, privileges, administration of well-being and discipline and, at first, of Pay"

On 28 May 1941, Rogers introduced the bill (H.R. 4906) providing for a Women's Army Auxiliary Corps. She stated:

In the beginning, I wanted very much to have these women taken in as a part of the Army....I wanted them to have the same rate of pension and disability allowance. I realized that I could not secure that. The War Department was very unwilling to have these women as a part of the army.

Major Berry and other officers of the G-1 Division planned a women's organization of 25,000 that would not be a part of the army but it would work with the army, and would be exclusive of the Army Nurse Corps.

The planners noted:

The problem in the United States is not primarily one of utilizing women in the military service for the purpose of releasing manpower, but is one of utilizing women to increase the efficiency of the Army. Both educational and technical qualifications should be set exceptionally high to make of the projected organization an elite corps; in order that it may quickly attain the highest reputation for both character and professional excellence.

Colonel John H. Hilldring, the G-1 stated in an interview after the war:

By the summer of 1941, General Marshall was intensely interested in the WAAC business. He foresaw a cycle of shortages; that of the moment was the supply shortage, in which the scarcity of supplies hindered mobilization, but he now became convinced that the bottleneck of the future would be that of manpower. He also considered the fact that war had become a complicated business which needed many civilian techniques, and that many of these were almost completely in the control of women. General Marshall asked me why we should try to train men in a specialty such as typing or telephone work which in civilian life has been taken over completely by women; this, he felt, was uneconomical and a waste of time which we didn't have. For example, the Army's telephone service had always had a reputation for being bad in spite of our superior equipment, and women operators could and did end all that. The Chief of Staff was also influenced by the fact that the ladies wanted in; he literally has a passionate regard for democratic ideals.

General Marshall wrote to Congress in April 1942:

I regard the passage of this bill at an early date as of considerable importance. In general, we have secured most of the legislation required for the complete mobilization of the Army so that we can go ahead with its development and definitely plan for the future. However, we lack Congressional authority for the establishment of a Women's Army Auxiliary Corps, and as a result can make no definite plans. Also, I am under continued pressure from many directions regarding this phase of our preparations. It is important that as quickly as possible we have a declared national policy in this matter. Women certainly must be employed in the overall effort of this nation.... We consider it essential that their status, their relationship to the military authority, should be clearly established.

Lieutenant Colonel Gillman C. Mudgett had been assigned by the War Department in December 1941 to plan to create the WAAC.

The senate approved Public Law 77-554 (H.R. 6293) on 14 May 1942 and was enacted on 15 May 1942.

=== Building the WAAC ===
The WAAC was modeled after comparable British units, especially the Auxiliary Territorial Service (ATS), which caught Marshall's attention. On 16 May 1942, Colonel Oveta Culp Hobby took oath as the director of WAAC. The training of WAAC was first conducted on 20 July 1942 at Fort Des Moines Provisional Army Officer Training School. Women studied field sanitation, first aid, military customs and courtesy, map reading, defense against chemical attack, defense against air attack, marching and drill, physical training, guard duty, company administration, army supply and mess management. On 29 August 1942 the first officer class of 436 WAAC officers graduated, including Charity Adams Earley, the first African-American female commissioned officer in the U.S. Army.

The first enlisted WAAC auxiliaries started training 17 August 1942, and the Army hoped that 450 WAACs would graduate each week freeing up that many men for combat duties.

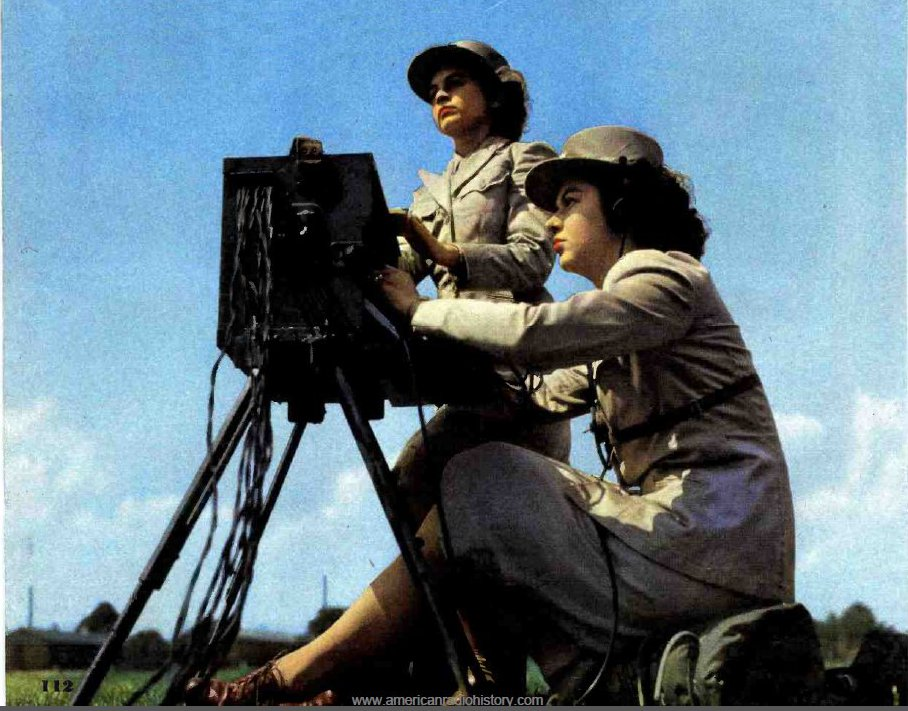
WAC Signal Corps field telephone operators, 1944

The WAAC were first trained in three major specialties based on competence. The brightest and nimblest were trained as switchboard operators. The following set of members were mechanics, who were required to have a high degree of mechanical aptitude and problem solving ability. The bakers were usually the lowest scoring recruits. The workforce was later expanded to include several other professions such as postal clerks, stenographers, and clerk-typists. WAC armourers maintained and repaired small arms and heavy weapons that they were not allowed to use. However, most of the enlisted WACs were assigned in clerical duties.

A physical training manual titled You Must Be Fit was published by the War Department in July 1943, aimed at bringing the women recruits to top physical standards. The manual begins by naming the responsibility of the women: "Your Job: To Replace Men. Be Ready to Take Over." It cited women's commitment to the war effort in Britain, Russia, Germany and Japan, and emphasized that the WAC recruits must be physically able to take on any job. The fitness manual was state-of-the-art for its day, with sections on warming up and progressive body-weight strength-building exercises for the arms, legs, stomach, neck and back. It included a section on designing a personal fitness routine after basic training and concluded with "The Army Way to Health and Added Attractiveness" with advice on skincare, make-up, and hairstyles.

Inept publicity and the poor appearance of the WAAC/WAC uniform, especially in comparison to that of the other services, handicapped recruiting efforts. A resistance by senior Army commanders was overcome by the efficient service of WAACs in the field, but the attitude of men in the rank and file remained generally negative and hopes that up to a million men could be replaced by women never materialized. The United States Army Air Forces became an early and staunch supporter of regular military status for women in the army. Nearly 40,000 WACs served in the Army Air Forces and were informally called "Air-WACs." In 1943, Major Betty Bandel was made the Air WAC Officer in charge.

In September 1945, the total strength of WAC was 86,541, among them 5,694 were officers, 60 were warrant officers and 80,787 were enlisted personnel. While the conservative opinion in the leadership of the Army was initially opposed to women serving in uniform, as was public opinion, the shortage of men necessitated a new policy.

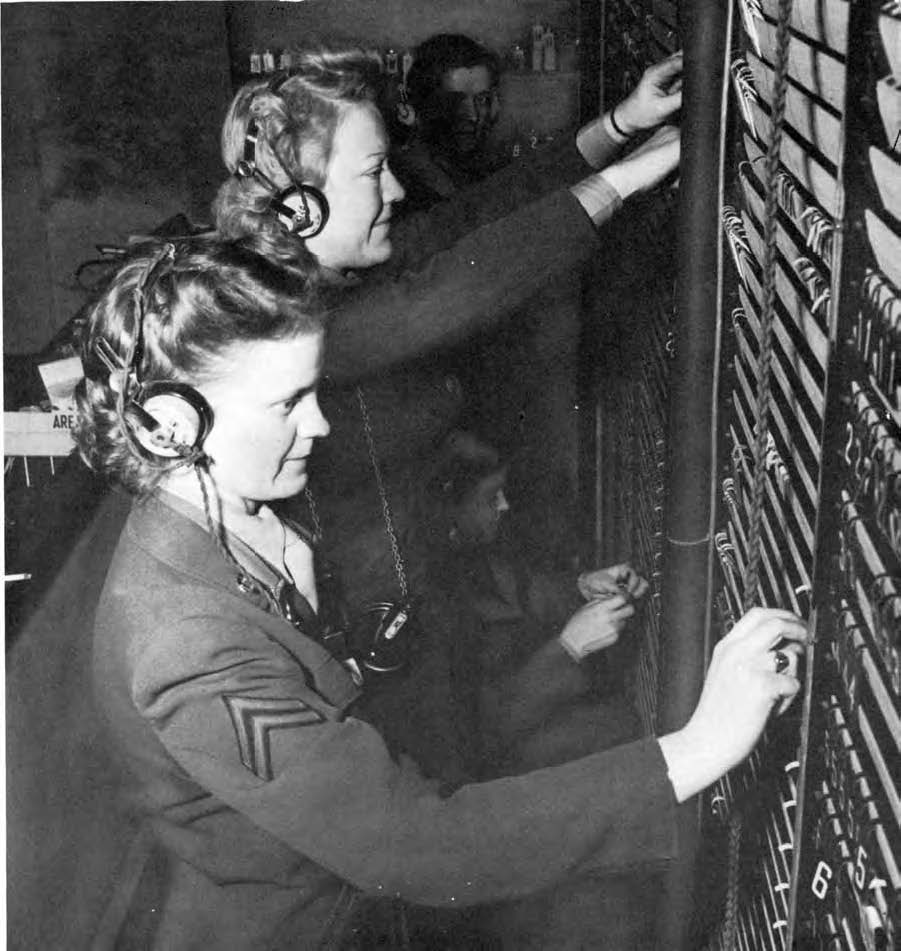
WACs working in the communications section of the operations room at an air force station.

While most women served stateside, some went to various places worldwide, including Europe, North Africa, and New Guinea. For example, WACs landed on Normandy Beach just a few weeks after the initial invasion. One of the most famous WAAC/WAC units to serve in the North African and Mediterranean theaters was the 6669th Headquarters Platoon, assigned to Lieutenant General Mark W. Clark's Fifth Army. The unit consisted of 10 telephone operators, 16 clerk-typists, 10 stenographers, seven clerks, and one administrative clerk.

=== Slander campaign ===
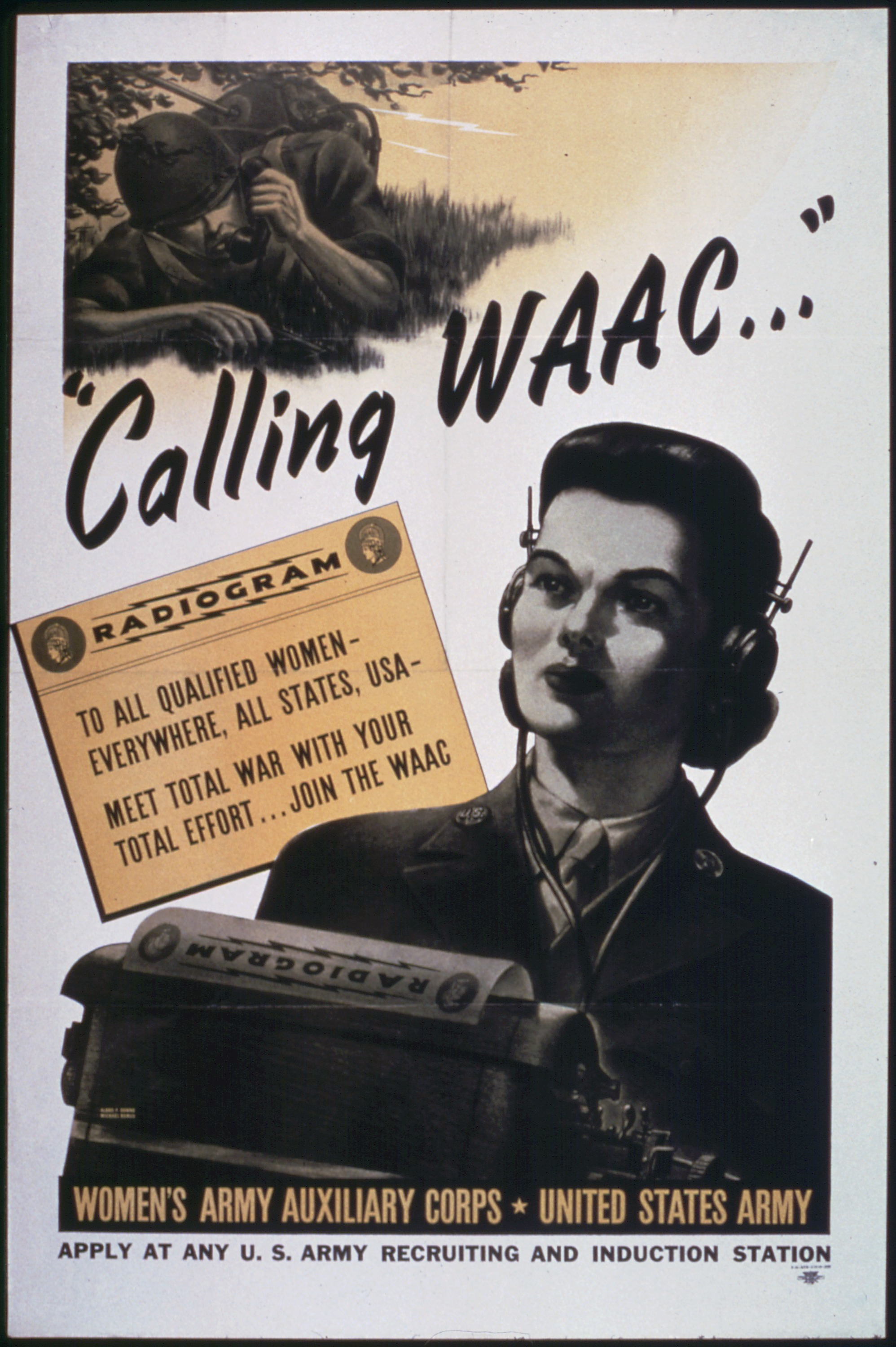
"Calling WAAC..." poster

In 1943 the recruiting momentum stopped and went into reverse as a massive slander campaign on the home front challenged the WACs as sexually immoral. Many soldiers ferociously opposed allowing women in uniform, warning their sisters and friends they would be seen as lesbians or prostitutes. Surveys found that the majority of Army enlisted soldiers thought that women of "poor quality" became WACs, and would tell sisters or girlfriends to not join; only 17% or less would tell them to become WACs. 72% of civilian women in a 1944 Gallup Poll said that Army men had influenced them to not enlist. Criticism of WACs also came from other women: Servicemen and officer's wives' idle gossip, local women who disliked the newcomers taking over "their town", female civilian employees resenting the competition (for both jobs and men), charity and volunteer organizations who resented the extra attention the WAACs received, and complaints and slander spread by disgruntled or discharged WAACs. One WAC recruiting officer said that at her post, many believed that Army women had deserted husbands and children to consort with male soldiers. Many civilians described WACs at local bases as heavy drinkers who frequently slept with men. Alternately, wanting to become a WAC was regarded as a possible proof of lesbianism, or of conversion by the WAC into such; one female reporter wrote of her surprise that Hobby looked feminine, and not "an unmarried woman with ... a Gertrude Stein haircut".

All investigations showed the rumors were false, but the belief that the Army wanted WACs as organized prostitutes (euphemistically termed as "morale boosters") was widespread among soldiers and civilians. Some Army officers explicitly stated that WACs improving soldiers' morale was more important than their official duties. While most WACs denied such rumors, some were also uncertain of their purpose. One woman soldier wrote that since "you can't change human nature", WACs could act as "a healthy source of entertainment for our gallant men, and win the war." The Army sometimes used WAC units to control male sexuality, such as Black units usually being assigned near Black male soldiers. British general Bernard Montgomery in December 1944 suggested assigning WAC and ATS units to the occupation of Germany to avoid Allied soldiers' fraternization with German women. Although WAC headquarters and European Theater of Operations WACs criticized the suggestion, one Army officer noted in a letter to a friend that the same colonel that had ordered officers to avoid prostitutes had, the next day, told them that they could date WACs.

Although several sources at the time made derogatory and offensive jokes and comments against military women, contemporaneous and historical accounts have focused on the work of syndicated columnist John O'Donnell. According to a military historian, even with its hasty retraction, O'Donnell's 8 June 1943 "Capitol Stuff" column did "incalculable damage." That column began, "Contraceptives and prophylactic equipment will be furnished to members of the WAACS, according to a super secret agreement reached by the high ranking officers of the War Department and the WAAC chieftain, Mrs. William Pettus Hobby…" This followed O'Donnell's 7 June column discussing efforts of women journalists and congresswomen to dispel "the gaudy stories of the gay and careless way in which the young ladies in uniform … disport themselves…."

The allegations were refuted, but the "fat was in the fire. The morals of the WAACs became a topic of general discussion…." Denials of O'Donnell's fabrications and others like them were ineffectual. According to Mattie Treadwell's Army History, as long as three years after O'Donnell's column, "religious publications were still to be found reprinting the story, and actually attributing the columnist's lines to Director Hobby. Director Hobby's picture was labeled 'Astounding Degeneracy' …."

=== Women of color ===
Black women served in the Army's WAAC and WAC, but very few served in the Navy. African American women serving in the WAC experienced segregation in much the same fashion as in U.S. civilian life. Some billets accepted WACs of any race, while others did not. Black women were taught the same specialties as white women, and the races were not segregated at specialty training schools. The US Army goal was to have 10 percent of the force be African-American, to reflect the larger U.S. population, but a shortage of recruits brought only 5.1 percent black women to the WAC. The first African-American officer in the WAC was Charity Adams Earley.

Other minority groups such as Asian Americans and Hispanic Americans were not segregated in the WACs in general. Corporal Ruth Chan Jang is one of the first documented Asian Americans to join the WACs and Technician 4th Grade Carmen Contreras Bozak was the first documented Hispanic Americans in the WACs. Grace Thorpe, daughter of football star Jim Thorpe, was one of the first native Americans to join the WACs.

=== Evaluations ===
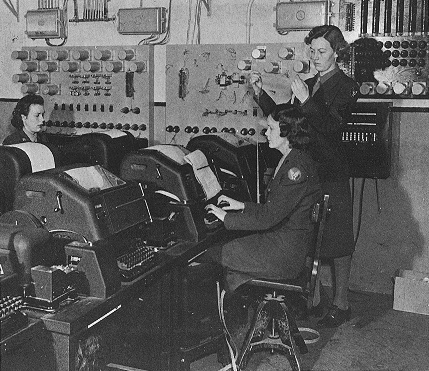
WACs operate teletype machines during World War II.

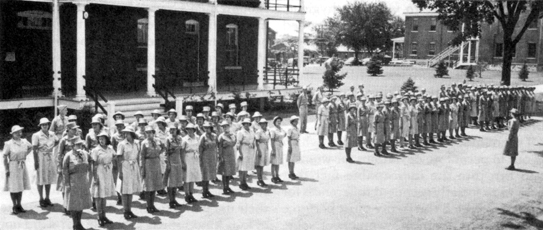
First Officer Candidate Class, WAAC Officer Training School, Fort Des Moines, Iowa, 20 July – 29 August 1942; reveille.

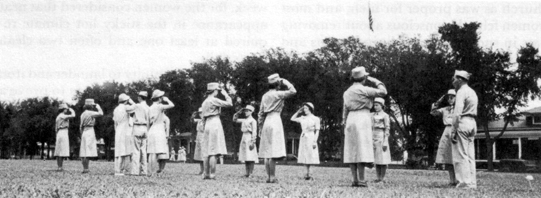
First Officer Candidate Class, WAAC Officer Training School, Fort Des Moines, Iowa, 20 July – 29 August 1942; instruction in Military Customs and Courtesy.

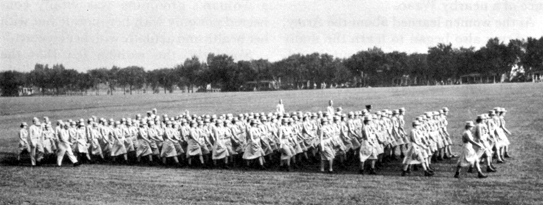
First Officer Candidate Class, WAAC Officer Training School, Fort Des Moines, Iowa, 20 July – 29 August 1942; close order drill.

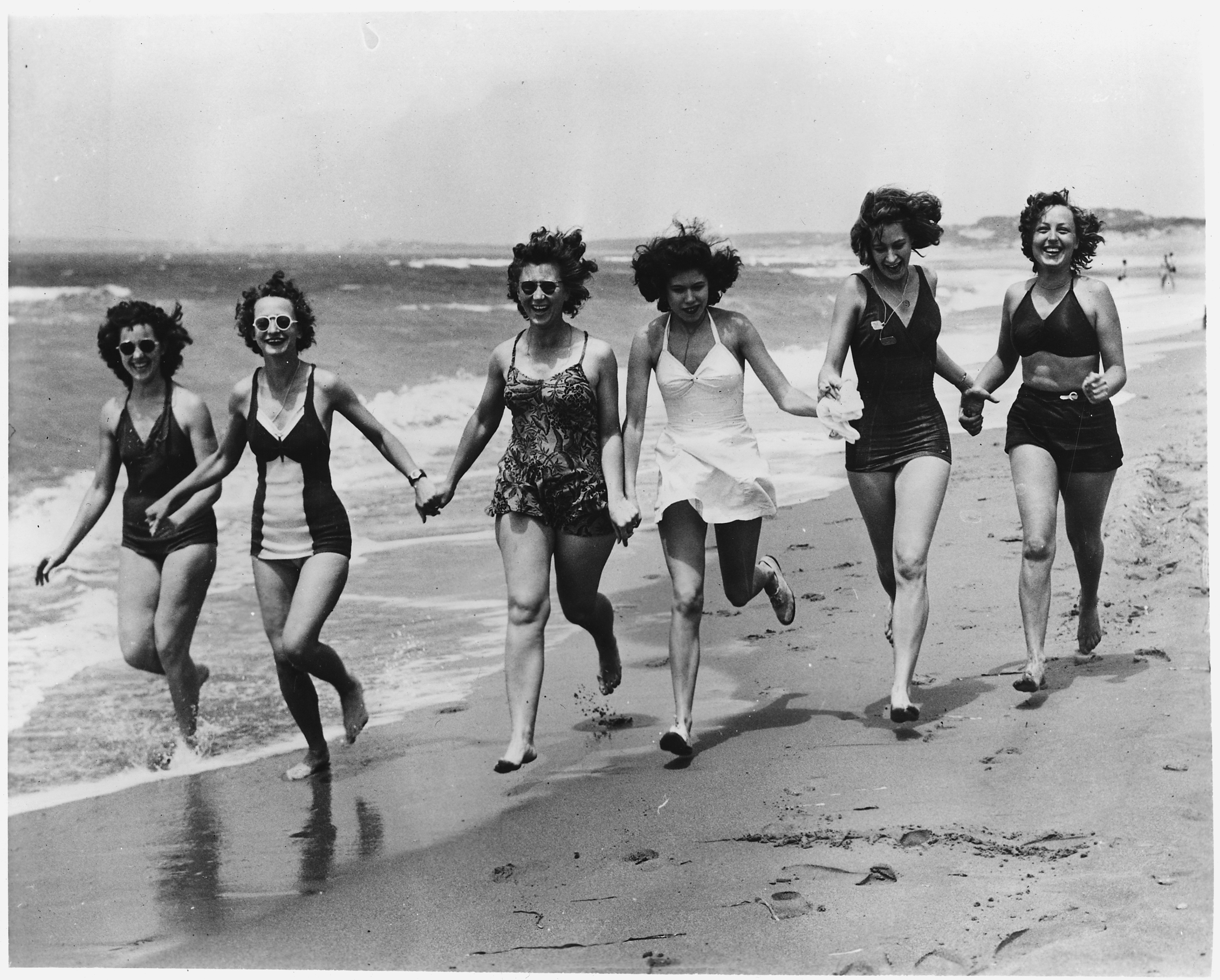
Members of the Women's Army Corps stationed in North Africa at the Mediterranean beach, 1944.

General Douglas MacArthur called the WACs "my best soldiers", adding that they worked harder, complained less and were better disciplined than men. Many generals wanted more of them and proposed to draft women but it was realized that this "would provoke considerable public outcry and Congressional opposition", and so the War Department declined to take such a drastic step. General Dwight D. Eisenhower praised the WACs by saying that, during the Second World War, women's contributions in efficiency, skill, spirit and determination were immeasurable. Nevertheless, the slander campaigns hurt the reputation of not only the WAC but other all female Corps like the Navy's WAVES; many women did not even want it known they were veterans.

During the same time period, other branches of the U.S. military had similar women's units including: the Navy's WAVES, the SPARS of the Coast Guard, United States Marine Corps Women's Reserve, and the (civil) Women Airforce Service Pilots. The British Armed Forces also had similar units including: the Women's Royal Naval Service ("WRENS"), the Auxiliary Territorial Service, and the Women's Auxiliary Air Force.

According to historian D'Ann Campbell, American society was not ready for women in military roles:

The WAC and WAVES had been given an impossible mission: they not only had to raise a force immediately and voluntarily from a group that had no military traditions, but also had to overcome intense hostility from their male comrades. The situation was highly unfavorable: the women had no clear purpose except to send men to the battlefront; duties overlapped with civilian employees and enlisted male coworkers, causing confusion and tension; and the leadership cadre was unprestigious, inexperienced and had little control over women and none over men. Although the military high command strongly endorsed their work, there were no centers of influence in the civilian world, either male nor female, that were committed to the success of the women's services, and no civilian institutions that provided preliminary training for recruits or suitable positions for veterans. WACs, WAVES, SPARS and women Marines were war orphans whom no one loved.

=== Manhattan Project ===
Starting in early 1943, a total of 422 WACs were assigned to the Corps of Engineers to work on the Manhattan Project, the secret US effort to build an atomic bomb. Major General Leslie R. Groves, director of the project, wrote: "Little is known of the significance of the contribution to the Manhattan Project by hundreds of members of the Women's Army Corps ... Since you received no headline acclaim, no one outside the project will ever know how much depended upon you."

Any women interested in positions on the project were told the following: they would be doing a hard job, would never be allowed to go overseas, attend Officer Candidate School, would never receive publicity, and would live at isolated stations with few recreational facilities. A surprising number of highly qualified women responded. It later proved possible to send WACs assigned the Manhattan Project to OCS without compromising security.

WAC units involved in the effort were awarded the Meritorious Unit Commendation; twenty women received the Army Commendation Ribbon and one, Captain Arlene G. Scheidenhelm, received the Legion of Merit. In addition, all members of the WAAC and the WAC who served in World War II received the Women's Army Corps Service Medal.

=== Demobilization ===
After the Second World War, a huge number of WACs were demobilized. In December 1946 the total number of WACs was 9,655, among them 1,189 were officers, five were warrant officers, and 8,461 were enlisted personnel.

=== Vietnam War ===
In 1964, the personnel officer at Headquarters, Military Assistance Command, Vietnam (MACV), in Saigon wrote to the director, then Colonel Gorman, that South Vietnam was organizing a Women's Armed Forces Corps (WAFC) and wanted U.S. WACs to assist them in planning and developing it. The MACV commander, then General William Westmoreland, authorized spaces for two WAC advisors. Before the requisitions arrived at the Pentagon, the MACV personnel officer, Brigadier General Ben Sternberg, wrote to Gorman, offering the advice that "The WAC officer should be a captain or major, fully knowledgeable in all matters pertaining to the operation of a WAC school and the training conducted therein. She should be extremely intelligent, an extrovert and beautiful. The WAC sergeant should have somewhat the same qualities... and should be able to type as well" Gorman replied that the WAC would "certainly try" to send women with "the qualifications you outline." Then, she added, "The combination of brains and beauty is, of course, common in the WAC."

By the time the requisitions arrived at the Pentagon in November 1964, the director had selected Major Kathleen I. Wilkes and Sergeant 1st class. Betty L. Adams to fill the positions. Both had extensive experience in WAC training, recruiting, administration, and command. On 15 January 1965, they arrived in Saigon and were met by Maj. Tran Cam Huong, director of the WAFC and commandant of the WAFC training center and her assistant, Major Ho Thi Ve.

The first WAC advisors advised the WAFC director and her staff on methods of organization, inspection, and management in recruiting, training, administering and assigning enlisted women and officer candidates. Time did not permit the first two WAC advisors to attend language school before they went to Saigon, but those who followed attended a twelve-week Vietnamese language course at the Defense Language Institute, Monterey, California. In 1968, an additional WAC officer advisor was assigned to the WAFC training center located on the outskirts of Saigon. The senior WAC advisor, then a lieutenant colonel and the NCO advisor, then a master sergeant, remained at WAFC headquarters in the city and continued to help the director of the WAFC to develop Corps-wide plans and policies. For additional training, members of the WAFC traveled to the United States. Between 1964 and 1971, 51 Vietnamese women officer candidates completed the WAC Officer Basic Course at the WAC School; one officer completed the WAC Officer Advanced Course.

Another group of WACs was assigned to Saigon beginning in 1965. That year Westmoreland requisitioned 15 WAC stenographers for MACV headquarters. Six arrived by December; the balance reported in over the next few months. Women in grades E-5 and higher with excellent stenographic skills, maturity and faultless records of deportment filled these positions for the next seven years. Peak strength reached 23 on 30 June 1970. The senior among them acted as NCO-in-charge and the senior WAC advisor to the WAFC was their officer-in-charge. Initially. the women were billeted in the Embassy Hotel, but they later moved to other hotels in Saigon. The WAC stenographers served at MACV headquarters and in support commands throughout the metropolitan area. Like everyone else, they worked six-and-a-half to seven days a week, ten to fifteen hours a day, and had little time for recreation or socializing. Nonetheless, several extended their tours in Vietnam and a few returned for second and third tours of duty.

Early in 1965, Westmoreland had also requisitioned a dozen WAC officers. They filled administrative positions at MACV headquarters, in the support commands and in the headquarters of a new command United States Army Vietnam (USARV). Major Audrey A. Fisher, the first to arrive, was assigned to the adjutant general's office. Like the enlisted women, the WAC officers lived in hotels in Saigon. They worked in personnel, administration, public information, intelligence, logistics, plans and training, and military justice. A few WAC officers served with the U.S. Army Central Support Command at Qui Nhon and Cam Ranh Bay.

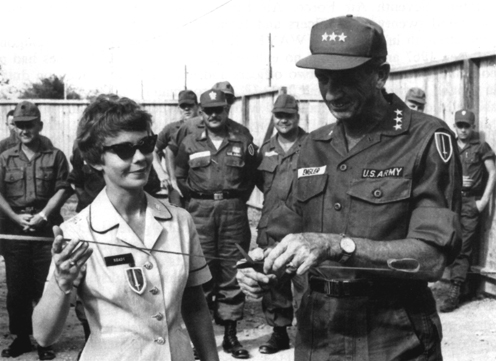
Captain Peggy E. Ready looks on as Lieutenant General Jean E. Engler, Deputy Commander, United States Army Vietnam, cuts the ribbon opening the new WAC barracks area, January 1967

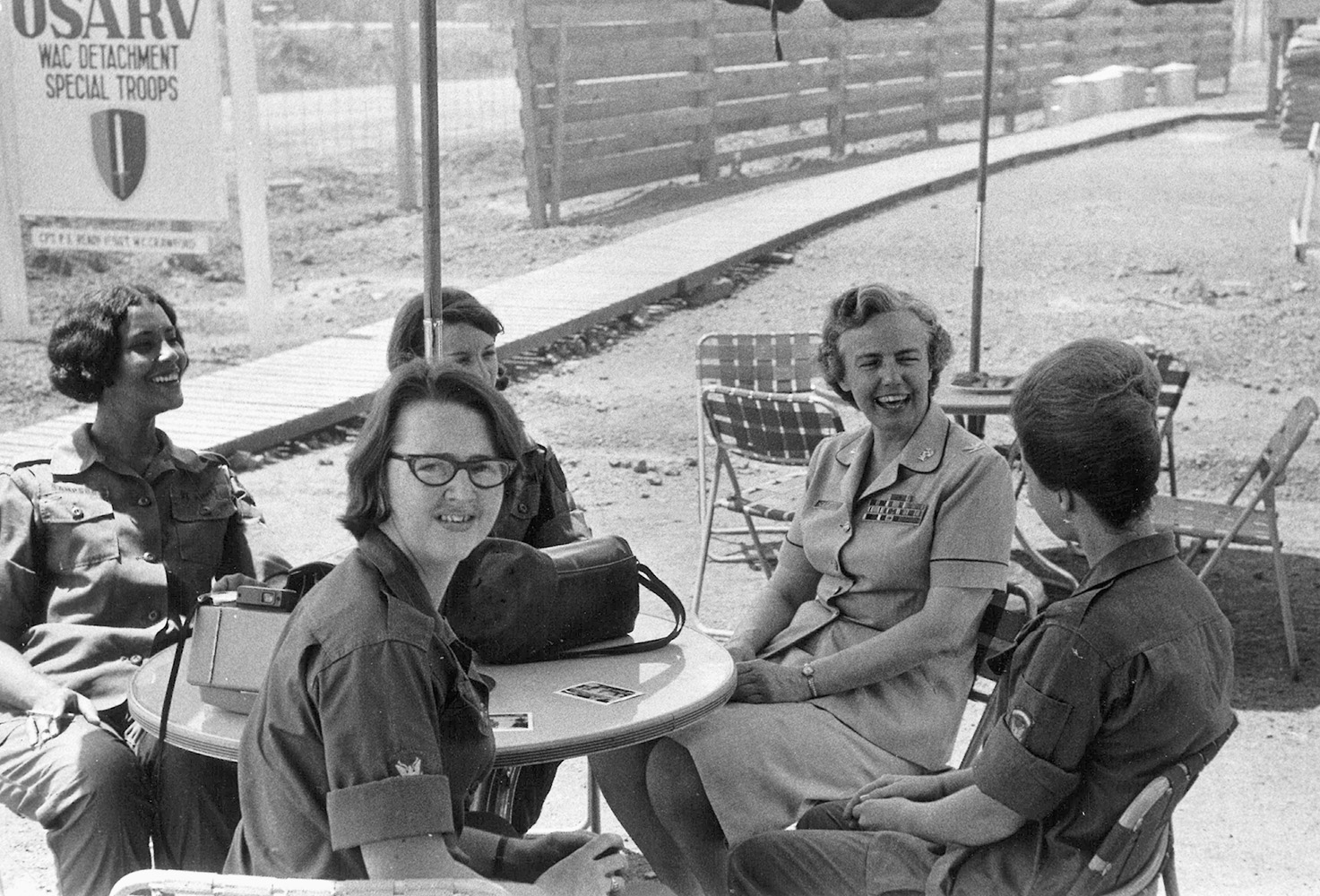
USARV Detachment WACs at Long Binh Post, October 1967

In April 1966, the USARV deputy commanding general, Lieutenant General Jean E. Engler, requested that a WAC detachment be assigned to his headquarters. He asked for 50 (later 100) clerk-typists and other administrative workers, plus a cadre section of an officer and five enlisted women to administer the unit. Some officers in USARV opposed the idea. They believed that the additional security required for women would outweigh the advantages of having the WACs serve in South Vietnam. However Engler won over the critics when he decided to house the WACs inside the U.S. military cantonment area at Tan Son Nhut International Airport rather than in the city, eliminating the need for additional guards. Engler realized that the WACs would be exposed to risk, but he did not consider it great enough to exclude WACs, and he did not request that women being assigned to USARV learn to fire weapons. However, he privately decided that if they were ever assigned to field installations there, he would recommend that they receive small weapons training. Engler's request for a WAC unit was approved by command channels in the Pacific area and at the Pentagon, including the director of the WAC, and, finally, by the chairman of the Joint Chiefs of Staff on 25 July 1966. The WAC cadre arrived in late 1966. First to arrive were 1st Sergeant Marion C. Crawford and the administrative NCO, Sgt. 1st Class Betty J. Benson. The commander, Capt. Peggy E. Ready, the supply sergeant, SSgt. Edith L. Efferson and unit clerks PFC Rhynell M. Stoabs and PFC Patricia C. Pewitt followed. They participated in a ground-breaking ceremony on 2 November for construction of the WAC barracks. Two months later, Army engineers completed eleven quonset huts, called hootches, for living quarters and unit offices. On 12 January 1967, 82 enlisted women who were to serve that first year at Headquarters, USARV, arrived. They were welcomed by the USARV band, the press, photographers, officers and enlisted men from the command. In July 1967 USARV and its component commands, including the assigned WACs, moved to Long Binh Post northeast of Saigon.

In January 1970, the WAC reached its peak strength in South Vietnam with 20 officers and 139 enlisted women. With the progress of Vietnamization and the withdrawal of U.S. forces, by the end of December 1970 the WAC detachment numbered 72; by 31 December 1971 it numbered 46 and by early 1972 it numbered only 35 enlisted women. On 21 September 1972 the Long Binh WAC detachment numbering 13 enlisted women had a standdown ceremony. At the end of December 1972 only two officers and 17 enlisted women remained at MACV headquarters or its subordinate commands and all were withdrawn by March 1973.

Approximately 700 WACs served in South Vietnam with no casualties. The Long Binh detachment received two campaign stars for the Vietnam Counter-Offensive Phase II (1 July 1966 – 31 May 1967) and the Tet Offensive Campaign (30 January 1968 – 1 April 1968).

=== Disbanded ===
In 1976, the Women's Officer Candidate School program at Fort McClellan was merged with the Officer Candidate (Branch Immaterial) program at Fort Benning. In the fall of that year the first female cadets started at West Point. The OCS program graduated the first female Army officers before the first West Point cadets graduated in 1980.

The WAC as a branch was disbanded on 20 October 1978 and all female units were integrated with male units, at that time the WAC had 52,996 members. Women serving as WACs at that time converted in branch to whichever Military Occupational Specialty they worked in. Since then, women in the US Army have served in the same units as men, though they have only been allowed in or near combat situations since 1994 when Defense Secretary Les Aspin ordered the removal of "substantial risk of capture" from the list of grounds for excluding women from certain military units. In 2015 Jeanne Pace, at the time the longest-tenured female warrant officer and the last former member of the WAC on active duty, retired. She had joined the WAC in 1972.

== Ranks ==
=== WAAC ===
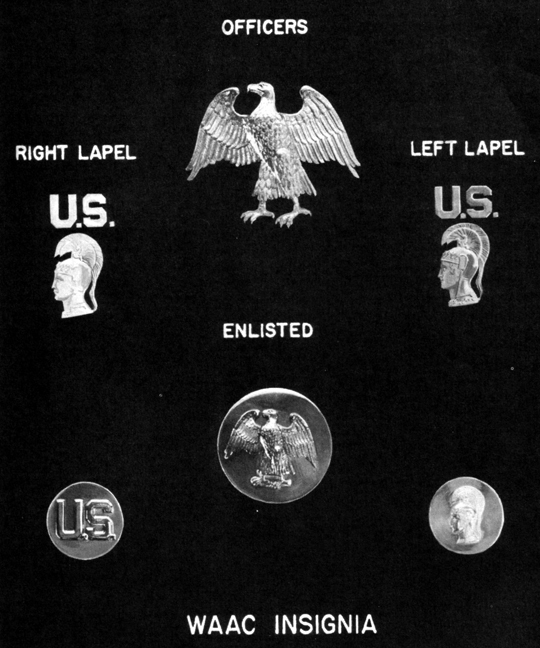
WAAC Insignia

Originally there were only four enlisted (or "enrolled") WAAC ranks (auxiliary, junior leader, leader, and senior leader) and three WAAC officer ranks (first, second and third officer). The Director was initially considered as equivalent to a major, then later made the equivalent of a colonel. The enlisted ranks expanded as the organization grew in size. Promotion was initially rapid and based on ability and skill. As members of a volunteer auxiliary group, the WAACs got paid less than their equivalent male counterparts in the US Army and did not receive any benefits or privileges.

WAAC organizational insignia was a Rising Eagle (nicknamed the "Waddling Duck" or "Walking Buzzard" by WAACs). It was worn in gold metal as cap badges and uniform buttons. Enlisted and NCO personnel wore it as an embossed circular cap badge on their Hobby Hats, while officers wore a "free" version (open work without a backing) on their hats to distinguish them. Their auxiliary insignia was the dark blue letters "WAAC" on an Olive Drab rectangle worn on the upper sleeve (below the stripes for enlisted ranks). WAAC personnel were not allowed to wear the same rank insignia as Army personnel. They were usually authorized to do so by post or unit commanders to help in indicating their seniority within the WAAC, although they had no authority over Army personnel.

WAAC ranks (May, 1942 – April, 1943)
Enrolled WAAC	US Army equivalent	WAAC officer	US Army equivalent
Senior leader	Master sergeant	Director of the WAAC	Major
Senior leader	First sergeant	First officer	Captain
Leader	Technical sergeant	Second officer	1st lieutenant
Leader	Staff sergeant	Third officer	2nd lieutenant
Leader	Sergeant		
Junior leader	Corporal		
Auxiliary first class	Private first class		
Auxiliary second class	Private		
Auxiliary third class	Recruit		

WAAC ranks (April, 1943 – July, 1943)
Enlisted WAAC	US Army equivalent	WAAC officer	US Army equivalent
Chief leader	Master sergeant	Director of the WAAC	Colonel
First leader	First sergeant	Assistant Director of the WAAC	Lieutenant-colonel
Technical leader	Technical sergeant	Field director	Major
Staff leader	Staff sergeant	First officer	Captain
Leader	Sergeant	Second officer	1st lieutenant
Junior leader	Corporal	Third officer	2nd lieutenant
Auxiliary first class	Private first class		
Auxiliary second class	Private		
Auxiliary third class	Recruit		

=== WAC ===
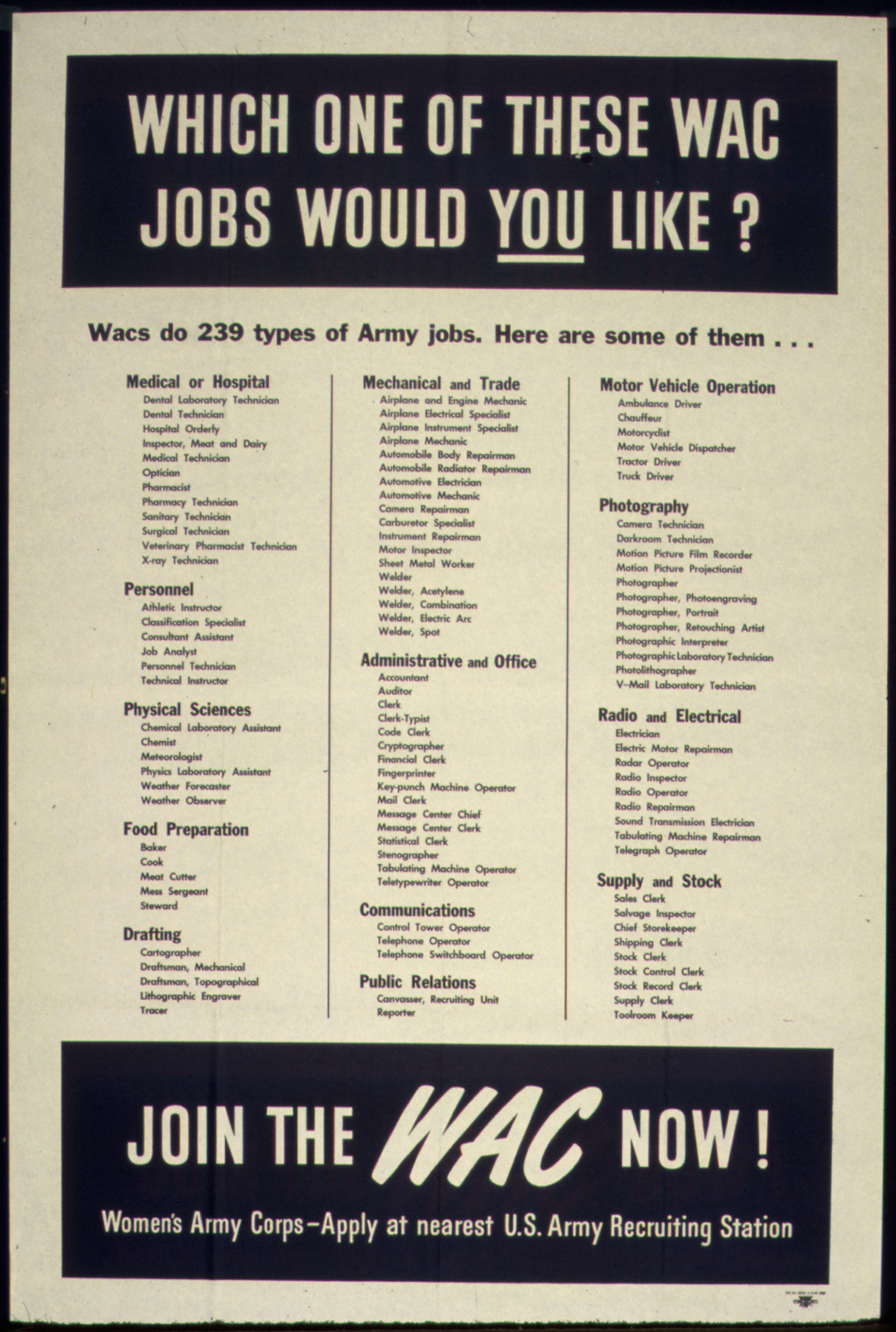
An WAC recruiting poster

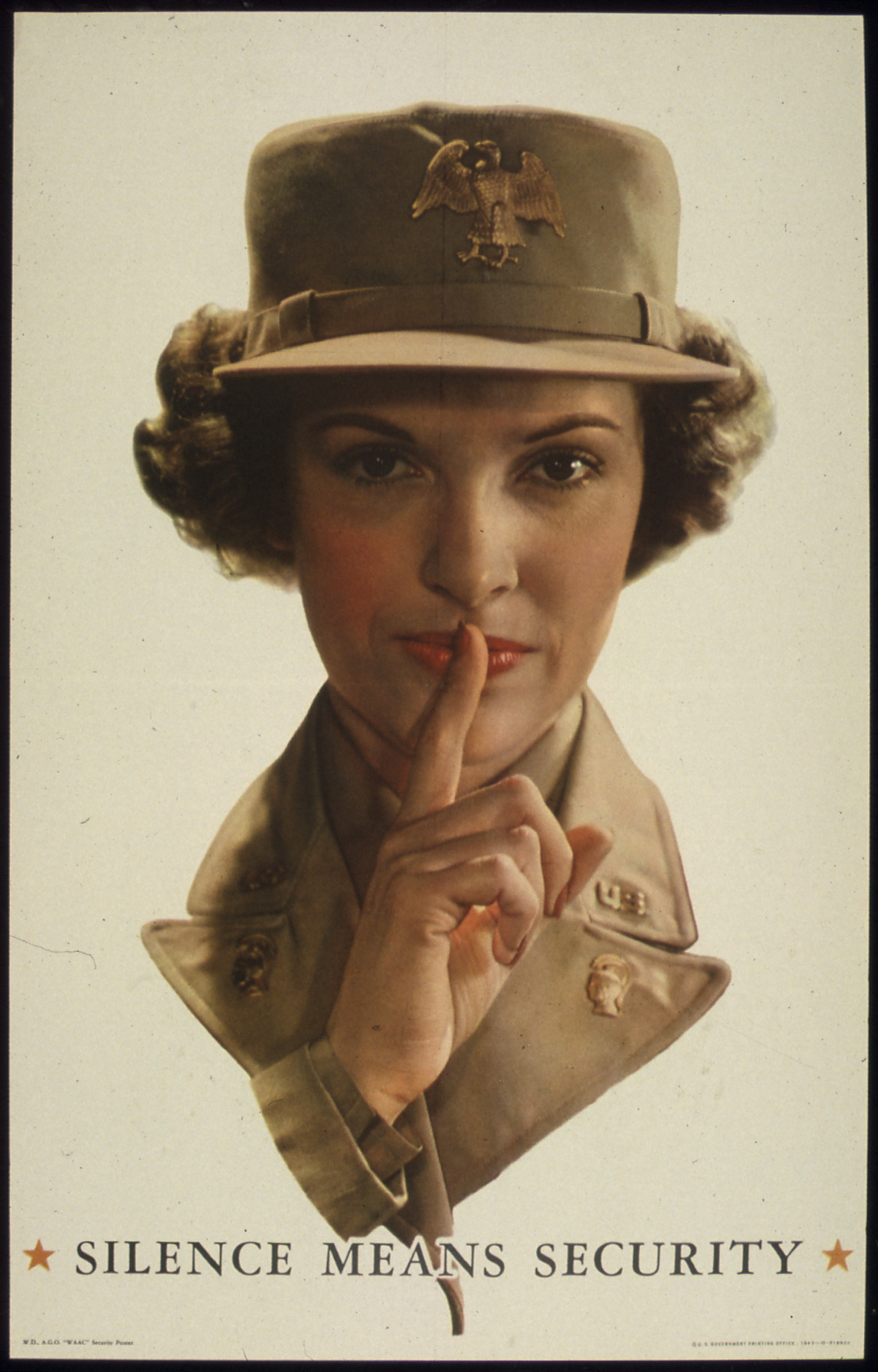
Women's Army Corps anti-rumor propaganda

The organization was renamed the Women's Army Corps in July 1943 when it was authorized as a branch of the US Army rather than an auxiliary group. The US Army's "GI Eagle" now replaced the WAAC's Rising Eagle as the WAC's cap badge. The WAC received the same rank insignia and pay as men later that September and received the same pay allowances and deductions as men in late October. They were also the first women officers in the army allowed to wear officer's insignia; the Army Nursing Corps did not receive permission to do so until 1944.

The WAC had its own branch insignia (the Bust of Pallas Athena), worn by "Branch Immaterial" personnel (those unassigned to a Branch of Service). US Army policy decreed that technical and professional WAC personnel should wear their assigned Branch of Service insignia to reduce confusion. During the existence of the WAC (1943 to 1978) women were prohibited from being assigned to the combat arms branches of the Army – such as the Infantry, Cavalry, Armor, Tank Destroyers, or Artillery and could not serve in a combat area. However, they did serve as valuable staff in their headquarters and staff units stateside or in England.

The army's technician grades were technical and professional specialists similar to the later specialist grade. Technicians had the same insignia as NCOs of the same grade but had a "T" insignia (for "technician") beneath the chevrons. They were considered the same grade for pay but were considered a half-step between the equivalent pay grade and the next lower regular pay grade in seniority, rather than sandwiched between the junior enlisted (i.e., private—private first class) and the lowest NCO grade of rank (viz., corporal), as the modern-day specialist (E-4) is today. Technician grades were usually mistaken for their superior NCO counterparts due to the similarity of their insignia, creating confusion.

There were originally no warrant officers in the WAC in July, 1943. Warrant officer appointments for army servicewomen were authorized in January 1944. In March 1944 six WACs were made the first WAC Warrant Officers – as administrative specialists or band leaders. The number grew to 10 by June, 1944 and to 44 by June, 1945. By the time the war officially ended in September 1945, there were 42 WAC warrant officers still in Army service. There was only a trickle of appointments in the late 1940s after the war.

Most WAC officers were company-grade officers (lieutenants and captains), as the WAC were deployed as separate or attached detachments and companies. The field grade officers (majors and lieutenant-colonels) were on the staff under the director of the WAC, its solitary colonel. Officers were paid by pay band rather than by grade or rank and did not receive a pay grade until 1955.

WAC ranks (September 1943 – 1945)
Pay Grade	Enlisted WAC	Monthly pay ($)	Yearly pay ($)	WAC officers	Monthly pay ($)	Yearly pay ($)
Grade 1	Master sergeant	138	1656	Colonel	333	4000
Grade 1	First sergeant	138	1656	Lieutenant colonel	291	3500
Grade 2	Technical sergeant	114	1368	Major	250	3000
Grade 3	Staff sergeant	96	1152	Captain	200	2400
Grade 3	Technician 3rd grade	96	1152	1st lieutenant	166	2000
Grade 4	Sergeant	78	936	2nd lieutenant	150	1800
Grade 4	Technician 4th grade	78	936	Chief warrant officer (Note: There were no chief warrant officer appointments in the WAC during the war because they did not meet the skill or seniority requirements for the rank. However, few servicemen did either. It required ten or more years of time in grade as either a warrant officer (junior grade) – a rank first created in 1941, staff warrant officer – a rank waitlisted since 1936, or an Army Mine Planter Service warrant officer – an Army sea auxiliary unit that was not allowed to recruit women.)	175	2100
Grade 5	Corporal	66	792	Warrant officer (junior grade)	150	1800
Grade 5	Technician 5th grade	66	792			
Grade 6	Private first class	54	648			
Grade 7	Private	50	600			

== List of directors ==
Image	Name	Start	End
	Colonel Oveta Culp Hobby	1942	1945
	Colonel Westray Battle Boyce	1945	1947
	Colonel Mary A. Hallaren	1947	1953
	Colonel Irene O. Galloway	1953	1957
	Colonel Mary Louise Rasmuson	1957	1962
	Colonel Emily C. Gorman	1962	1966
	Brigadier General Elizabeth P. Hoisington	1966	1971
	Brigadier General Mildred Inez Caroon Bailey	1971	1975
	Brigadier General Mary E. Clarke	1975	1978

== Women's Army Corps Veterans' Association ==
The Women's Army Corps Veterans' Association—Army Women's United (WACVA) was organized in August 1947. Women who have served honorably in the Women's Army Auxiliary Corps (WAAC) or the Women's Army Corps (WAC) and those who have served or are serving honorably in the United States Army, the United States Army Reserve, or the Army National Guard of the United States, are eligible to be members.

== Notable WACs ==
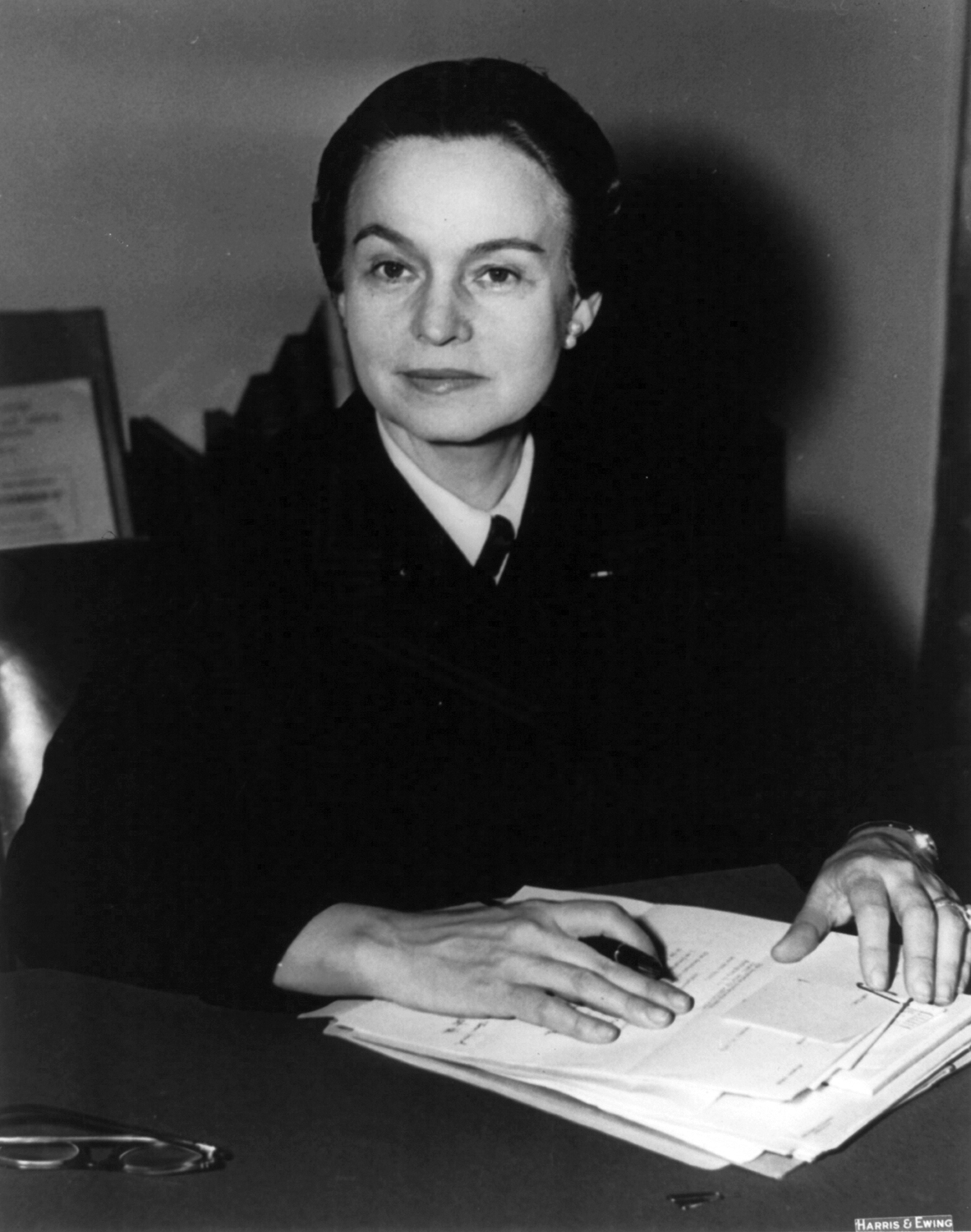
First WAC Director Oveta Culp Hobby

Colonel Geraldine Pratt May (1895–1997 [served 1942–19??). In March, 1943 May became one of the first female officers assigned to the Army Air Forces, serving as WAC Staff Director to the Air Transport Command. In 1948 she was promoted to Colonel (the first woman to hold that rank in the Air Force) and became Director of the WAF in the US Air Force, the first to hold the position.

Lt. Col. Charity Adams was the first African-American WAC officer and the second to be promoted to the rank of major. Promoted to major in 1945, she commanded the segregated all-female 6888th Central Postal Battalion in Birmingham, England. The 6888th landed with the follow-on troops during D-Day and were stationed in Rouen and then Paris during the invasion of France. It was the only African-American WAC unit to serve overseas during World War II.

Lt. Col. Harriet West Waddy (1904–1999 [served 1942–1952]) was one of only two African-American women in the WAC to be promoted to the rank of major. Due to her earlier experience serving with director Mary McLeod Bethune of the Bureau of Negro Affairs, she became Colonel Culp's aide on race relations in the WAC. After the war, she was promoted to the rank of lieutenant-colonel in 1948.

Lt. Col. Eleanore C. Sullivan [served 1952–1955] was WAC Center and WAC School commander located at Fort McClellan.

Lieutenant Colonel Florence K. Murray served at WAC headquarters during World War II. She became the first female judge in Rhode Island in 1956. In 1977 she was the first woman to be elected as a justice of the Supreme Court of Rhode Island.

Major Elna Jane Hilliard [served 1942–1946] commanded the 2525th WAC unit at Fort Myer, Virginia. She was the first woman to serve on a United States Army general court martial.

In January 1943, Captain Frances Keegan Marquis became the first to command a women's expeditionary force, the 149th WAAC Post Headquarters Company. Serving in General Eisenhower's North African headquarters in Algiers, this group of about 200 women performed secretarial, driving, postal, and other non-combat duties. An Army history called this company "one of the most highly qualified WAAC groups ever to reach the field. Hand-picked and all-volunteer, almost all members were linguists as well as qualified specialists, and almost all eligible for officer candidate school."

Louisiana Register of State Lands Ellen Bryan Moore attained the rank of captain in the WACs and once recruited three hundred women at a single appeal to join the force.

Captain Dovey Johnson Roundtree was among 39 African-American women recruited by Dr. Mary Bethune for the first WAACs officer training class. Roundtree was responsible for recruiting African-American women. After leaving the Army, she went to Howard University law school and became a prominent civil rights lawyer in Washington, D.C. She was also one of the first women ordained in the A.M.E. Church.

In February 1943 Lieutenant Anna Mac Clarke became, when a Third Officer, the first African-American to lead an all-white WAAC unit.

Chief Warrant Officer 4 Elizabeth C. Smith USAF (WAC / USAAF 1944–1947, WAF / USAF 1948–1964) was one of the first WAF warrant officers in 1948.

Chief Warrant Officer 5 Jeanne Y. Pace, was the longest-serving female in the army and the last active duty soldier who was a part of the WAC as of 2011. Her final assignment was Bandmaster of the 1st Cavalry Division where she retired after 41 years of service. She is also a recipient of the Daughters of the American Revolution Margaret Cochran Corbin Award which was established to pay tribute to women in all branches of the military for their extraordinary service with previous recipients including Major Tammy Duckworth, Major General Gale Pollock, and Lt General Patricia Horoho.

Elizabeth "Tex" Williams was a military photographer. She was one of the few women photographers that photographed all aspects of the military.

Mattie Pinette served as personal secretary to President Dwight D. Eisenhower.

CW4 Amy Sheridan was the first American woman officer to command a United States military aviation company stationed outside of the United States and the first Jewish woman to become a career aviator in the United States Armed Services.

Chief Warrant Officer 5 Tracy Garder was the last Women's Army Corps Soldier on active duty as of September 2022. Garder received the Legion of Merit in August 2022, she joined Women's Army Corps in 1978, one year before the Corps was integrated in the Army.

Private Marjory Linheart Babinetz was the first WAC to receive the Air Medal in 1944. Mildred Kelly was the first African American woman to serve as an Army sergeant major (1972) and the first female command sergeant major serving at a predominantly male Army installation (1974).

Violet Hill Gordon was a military officer and government official. She served as an officer during World War II and was among the first African-American women to be commissioned in the U.S. Army. She later became a leading figure in federal civil service and social justice advocacy.

== Popular culture ==
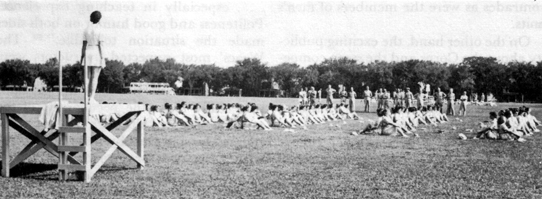
First Officer Candidate Class, WAAC Officer Training School, Fort Des Moines, Iowa, 20 July – 29 August 1942; physical training.

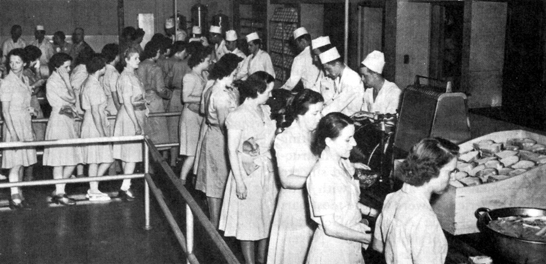
First Officer Candidate Class, WAAC Officer Training School, Fort Des Moines, Iowa, 20 July – 29 August 1942; chow line.

- During the war years, popular comic strip Dick Tracy, drawn by Chester Gould, featured a young WAC spurning the romantic advances of a villain. Likewise Tracy's sweetheart Tess Truehart was a WAC corporal who helped Tracy capture the German spy Alfred "The Brow" Brau in 1943.
- A series of cartoon postcards distributed during the war years depicted WACs hitting Adolf Hitler over the head with a rolling pin ("We're Giving Him A Big WAC!"), standing in morning formation exercises ("Don't Worry—Uncle Sam Is Keeping Us in Line!"), and window shopping for civilian-style dresses ("Just Looking...").
- The 1945 film Keep Your Powder Dry features Lana Turner joining the WACs.
- The 1949 film I Was a Male War Bride depicts Cary Grant as an amorous French officer who marries an American WAC, played by Ann Sheridan, and their escapades as he attempts to emigrate to the United States under the auspices of the 1945 War Brides Act.
- The 1951 film Love Nest features Marilyn Monroe as a driver in the WACs in Paris in World War II who subsequently moved to New York City.
- 1952 film Never Wave at a WAC stars Rosalind Russell as the daughter of a senator who enlists to be closer to her boyfriend in Paris. Her ex-husband causes problems, but she falls back in love with him.
- In Superman issue #82 (May–June 1953) Lois Lane joined the Women's Army Corps.
- The 1954 film Francis Joins the WACS stars Donald O'Connor as an officer mistakenly assigned to the Women's Army Corps. He and Francis the Talking Mule help the WACs prove their worth to a highly skeptical general.
- General Blankenship's secretary, Corporal Etta Candy (Beatrice Colen) in the first season of Wonder Woman was a WAC veteran.
- The song "Surrender" by Cheap Trick is about a baby boomer child of a former member of the WAC who served in the Philippines.
- Mare's War, a novel by Tanita S. Davis, centers around an African-American girl who joins the WAC.
- In an episode of The Looney Tunes Show, Granny tells Daffy Duck a story about when she served as a WAC and prevented the theft of the Eiffel Tower and numerous artworks from The Louvre.
- Miss Grundy, a teacher in the Archie Comics series, was a WAC.
- The Phil Silvers Show made numerous references to the WACs. Several of the supporting cast, such as Sgt. Joan Hogan (Elisabeth Fraser), are members of the WAC and many of the gags and jokes in the show revolve around women in the army.

== See also ==
- 32nd and 33rd Post Headquarters Companies
- 6888th Central Postal Directory Battalion
- Anne A. Lentz - designer of many WAAC uniform items
- Air Transport Auxiliary
- Army Women's Museum
- Nisei women translators in World War II
- Women in the military
- Women in the United States Army
- Women's Air Force (WAF)
- Women's Army Volunteer Corp
