= Mattie Pinette =

- Born: 1903
- Died: 1999 (aged 95–96)
- Alma mater: University of Maine
- Military career
- Branch: United States Army; Women's Army Corps
- Service years: 1942-1946
- Rank: Captain
- Units: Allied Force Headquarters; Supreme Headquarters Allied Expeditionary Force
- Conflicts: World War II
- Other work: United States Atomic Energy Commission

Mattie Pinette (7 Feb 1903–27 Aug 1999) graduated from the University of Maine and worked as a secretary for the National Bureau of Standards and the Civil Aeronautics Administration in Washington, DC.

In 1942 she joined the Women's Army Corps (United States Army) (WAC) and was assigned to Allied Force Headquarters (AFHQ) in North Africa. On her way to Africa the British troop ship on which she was sailing, the Strathalan, was torpedoed by a German submarine. Pinette and several other WACs spent ten hours in a lifeboat before being rescued. At AFHQ Pinette worked for Robert McClure, head of the psychological warfare office, and also assisted the U.S. delegation to the Casablanca Conference. She was later assigned to the personal staff of Dwight D. Eisenhower and served as one of his secretaries in England. She was present at his headquarters on D-Day and compiled a detailed account of the events surrounding the invasion. After the liberation of France, Pinette, who was fluent in French, was assigned to the staff of Major General John Taylor Lewis, who was head of the Supreme Headquarters Allied Expeditionary Force (SHAEF) mission to the French government.

After the end of the war she traveled to Palestine and Greece with U.S. diplomats to study local conditions. In 1946 she resigned from the Army and became a personnel officer at the United States Atomic Energy Commission, from which she retired in 1964. In later years she was active in the American Association of University Women.
