= Jack Sheridan =

Jack Sheridan may refer to:

- Jack Sheridan (footballer) (1898–1930), Australian rules footballer
- Jack Sheridan (poet) (1905-1967), American poet and orator
- Jack Sheridan (umpire) (1862–1914), American baseball umpire
- Jack Sheridan (hurler) (born 1997), Irish hurler
- Jack Sheridan (Virgin River), fictional character

== See also ==
- John Sheridan (disambiguation)
