= Elizabeth Williams (photographer) =

American photographer (born 1924)

Elizabeth "Tex" Williams
- Born: 1924; Houston, Texas, U.S.
- Education: Fort Monmouth, New Jersey, Photo School
- Known for: Photography
- Movement: Women's Army Corps, Photography

Elizabeth "Tex" Williams (born 1924) is an American photographer. She joined the Women's Army Corps in 1944 at the age of 20 as one of the few African-American women photographers in the military.

== Life and education ==
Williams was born in Houston in 1924, where she was raised in a working-class family. She served in the Women's Army Corps, where she was stationed in Iowa and Arizona. She later retired to Huachuca City, Arizona.

She was educated at Photographic Division School in New Jersey with honors and graduated as valedictorian because the army did not allow African Americans in the military's school for photography.

== Career ==
Williams worked in the Women's Army Corps as a photographer from 1944 to 1970. She was stationed at the all-black base in Iowa because the military was still segregated, a practice that endured even after the military's 1948 ending of segregation. Since the military was segregated until the Executive Order 9981, she had taken many photos of African Americans. Within and outside of the military, Williams photographed the "New Negro" that changed the stereotypical narrative of African Africans.

She photographed all things military. She took intelligence photos, medicine, defense, and ID pictures. She later worked as an intelligence photographer for defense intelligence agencies.

== Significance ==
Scholars such as Jeanne Moutoussamy-Ashe and Jacqueline Ellis describe Williams as a pioneer, whose race and gender made professional success as a photographer unlikely, let alone in the American military, which would remain segregated in practice until the 1980s, though the official policy ended in 1948. African Americans were barred from army photography schools and training programs, so she had to go to Photographic Division School in New Jersey, where she was the first woman and African American to graduate from there, which she did with honors. She was the only women to photograph the Air Force.
