= Violet Hill Gordon =

American officer

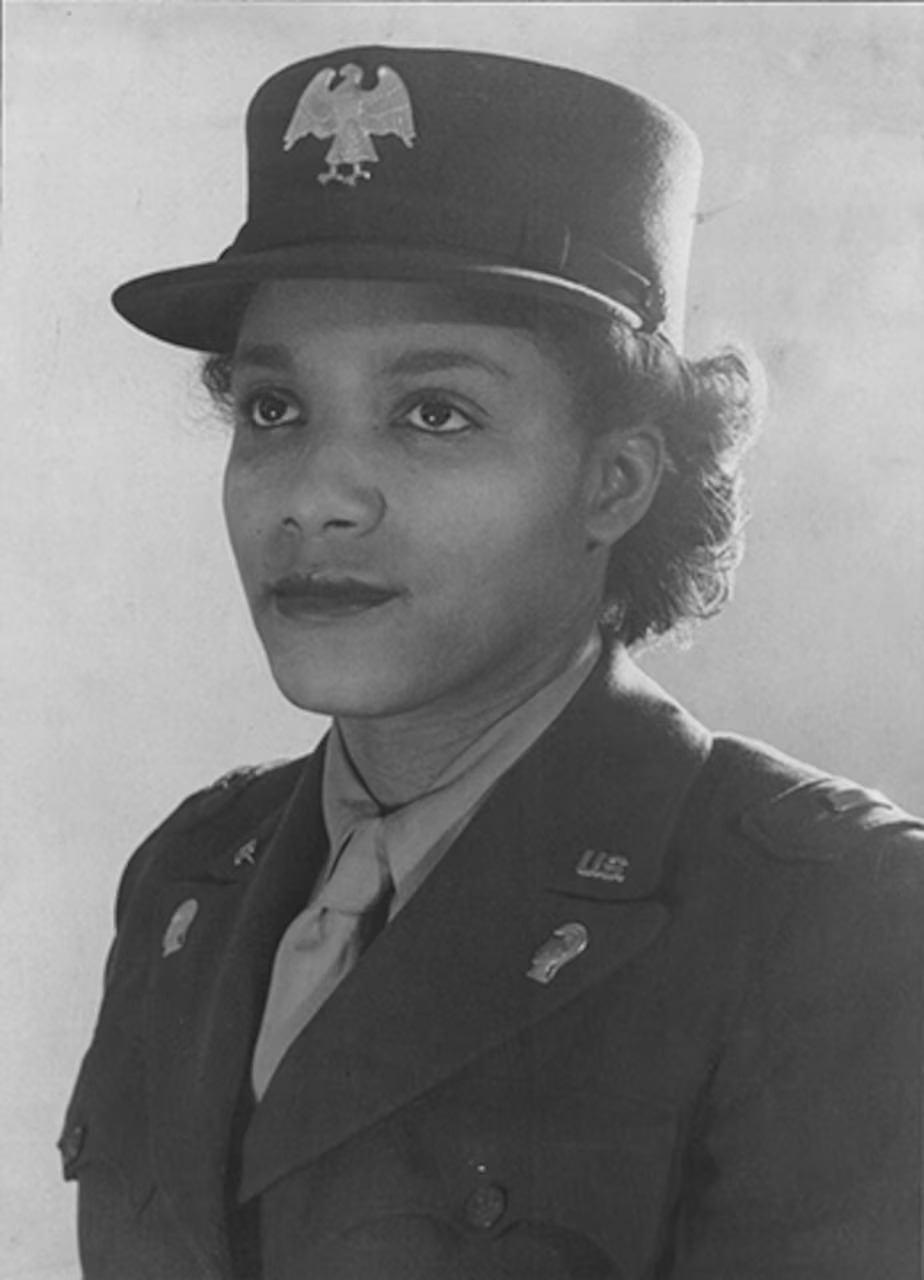
- Born: Violet Hill Askins; October 7, 1916; Washington, D.C., United States
- Died: July 18, 2018 (aged 101); Palm Coast, Florida, United States
- Military career
- Allegiance: United States
- Branch: United States Army
- Service years: 1942–1946
- Rank: Second Officer (WAC); Captain (later)
- Unit: 6888th Central Postal Directory Battalion
- Conflicts: World War II
- Other work: Sociologist, U.S. government official

Violet Hill Gordon (née Askins; October 7, 1916 – July 18, 2018) was a United States Army officer and government official. She was a member of the Women's Army Corps and served as a Second officer and later Captain during World War II. Gordon was among the first African-American women to be commissioned in the U.S. Army.

== Biography ==
Violet Hill Gordon was born on October 7, 1916, in Oklahoma. She earned a bachelor's degree from Howard University and a master's degree in social work from The Catholic University of America, both in Washington, D.C..

In 1942, Hill joined the newly formed Women's Army Auxiliary Corps (WAAC), In her history interview with Judith Kent in 2002, Hill said:

Well, I joined because my best friend Mildred Osby appeared at my house one day, all excited because she had either received information or had learned that there was going to be organized a Women's Army Corps. She wanted very much to be part of it; and, as we were very close friends she thought it would be wonderful if I also was interested and would do so. At that time, I was working in the state civil service, I was supervising a stenographic pool. I was not bored, but restless, and kind of stuck, I guess. But I wasn't that excited about entering into anything that sounded as regimented as the Army. So I didn't pick up on it initially. But she kept after me and after me and I finally said, “Well, okay.”

Gordon enlisted in the Women's Army Corps after being accepted into its first officer candidate class for women. Following her training, she was assigned to Fort Huachuca, Arizona, where the first detachment of African-American women in the WAC was stationed. She served with an African-American women’s unit that was deployed to England and later France during World War II, where she worked in military mail distribution centers handling large quantities of unsorted mail.

After the war, she pursued a career in the federal government, focusing on civil rights, public administration, and social justice.

Gordon died on July 18, 2018, in Palm Coast, Florida, at age 102.

== Legacy ==
Violet Hill Gordon is remembered as a pioneering figure among African-American women in the U.S. military. Her leadership in the 6888th Battalion and her public service career have been celebrated in retrospectives by the Department of Veterans Affairs and military history institutions.
