= General Sheridan (disambiguation) =

Philip Sheridan (1831–1888) was a Union Army major general and later General of the Army of the U.S. General Sheridan may also refer to:

- John T. Sheridan (fl. 1970s–2010s), U.S. Air Force lieutenant general
- Michael K. Sheridan (born 1934), U.S. Marine Corps brigadier general
