= Margaret Sheridan =

Margaret Sheridan may refer to:

- Margaret Sheridan (actress) (1926–1982), American actress
- Margaret Sheridan (writer) (1912–1980), British writer
- Margaret Burke Sheridan (1889–1959), Irish opera singer
