= 32nd and 33rd Post Headquarters Companies (WAC) =

- Active: 1942–45
- Country: United States
- Branch: United States Army
- Type: Headquarters
- Role: Take over post duties to free infantry for combat service.
- Size: 330
- Part of: Women's Army Corps

The 32nd and 33rd Post Headquarters Companies were two all-black units of the Women's Army Auxiliary Corps (WAAC), later becoming the Women's Army Corps (WAC). The two companies were incorporated by fall of 1942 and consisted of 330 members total. They were the first group of WAACs assigned to a military installation inside the United States during World War II. The 32nd and 33rd were assigned to Fort Huachuca, where there was an all-black division of U.S. Army men.

== History ==
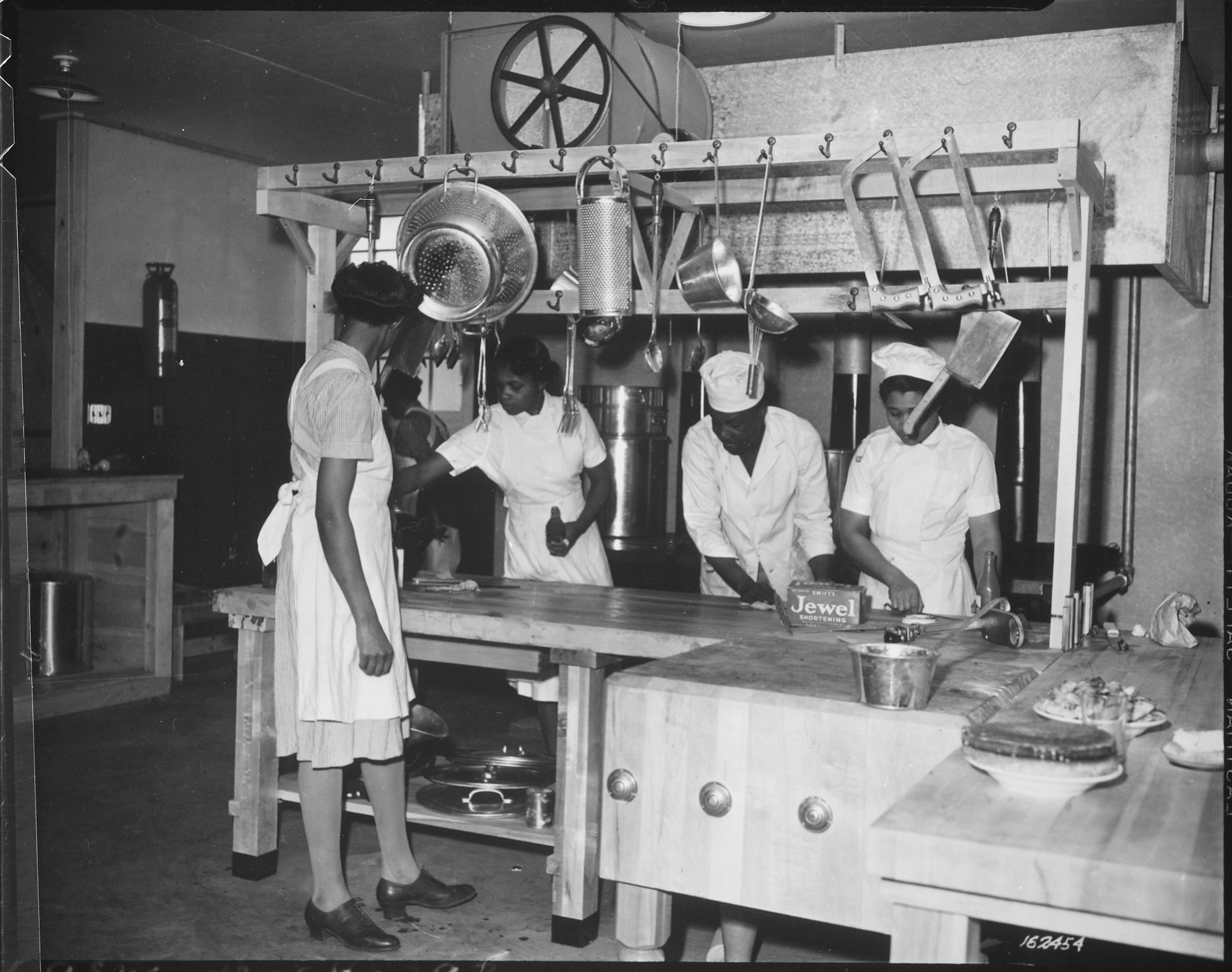
"... WAAC cooks prepare dinner for the first time in new kitchen at Fort Huachuca, Arizona.", 12 May 1942 – NARA – 531152

The 32nd and 33rd Post Headquarters Companies started out as Women's Auxiliary Army Corps (WAAC). When the WAACs changed to WAC, many of the black women who had joined stayed on as WACs.

The black women enlisted in the WAACs started out in Fort Des Moines, Iowa, for training, and where they lived in segregated conditions from the white WAACs.

The 32nd and 33rd Post Headquarters Companies arrived at Fort Huachuca, Arizona on 4 December 1942. The WAACs arrived by five Pullman cars and were greeted by approximately 10,000 welcomers at the station. A new unit, including six barracks, two mess halls, and an administration building, was built in preparation for the women's arrival. A large recreation area for the WAACs was also built. This was about 500 feet long by 60 feet wide and included a basketball court and places to play volleyball, softball and tennis. After getting off the train, the WAACs stood in formation for the post commander, Colonel Edwin N. Hardy to review the troops on the parade field.

The primary duties of the 32nd and 33rd Post Headquarters Companies were to take over post support duties at Fort Huachuca from the 93rd Infantry Division, releasing them for "possible combat assignments." Jobs that the 32nd and 33rd companies took over included working as typists, stenographers, clerks, messengers, receptionists, switch-board operators, librarians, medical technicians, photographers and postal clerks, who were also known to the male soldiers as "postal packin' mamas."

The 32nd and 33rd Post Headquarters Companies had several officers, including Corrie Sherard, Frances C. Alexander, Geraldine Bright, Vera Harrison, Natalie F. Donaldson, Mildred L. Osby, and Violet Askins. Alexander was 2nd Lieutenant, and led the 32nd company. Mary Kearney, 2nd Lieutenant was commander of the 33rd.

The companies served until late 1945, when they were disbanded.
