= Ryan Sheridan =

Ryan Sheridan may refer to:

- Ryan Sheridan (footballer) (born 2009), Irish professional footballer
- Ryan Sheridan (musician) (born 1982), Irish singer, songwriter and guitarist
- Ryan Sheridan (rugby league) (born 1975), Irish rugby league player and coach
