= Richard Sheridan =

Richard Sheridan may refer to:

- Richard Bingham Sheridan (1822–1897), Australian civil servant
- Richard Brinsley Sheridan (1751–1816), Irish playwright
- Richard Brinsley Sheridan (politician) (1806–1888), Irish politician

== See also ==
- Dick Sheridan, American football coach and college athletics administrator
