= Sheridan, West Virginia =

Unincorporated community in West Virginia, US

Coordinates: 38°14′25″N 82°11′55″W

Sheridan is an unincorporated community in Lincoln County, in the U.S. state of West Virginia.

== History ==
A post office called Sheridan was established in 1887, and remained in operation until 1947. The community was named after Philip Sheridan, a Union general in the Civil War.
