= Sheridan Winn =

British journalist and novelist

Sheridan Winn is a British journalist and novelist.

== Family ==
She was born Sheridan Ebbage in Drayton, Norfolk, the eldest of four sisters. She married and later divorced illustrator Chris Winn. They had two children.

Winn studied graphic design at Bristol Polytechnic and the University of Bristol. She earned a teaching certificate from Keswick College of Education, and worked as an art and English teacher in Norwich schools from 1979 to 1985.

Starting in 1980, she worked as the business manager for her husband Chris Winn and their company Chris Winn Associates, which produced the cartoon "Mad Gadget" for the Young Telegraph. They produced a "Mad Gadget" computer game (1993) and book (1995).

In 2008 she published the first book in her series The Sprite Sisters. The books have been translated into German; Parts 9 and 10 have so far only been published in German.

The series is popular in Germany, and has been adapted into a German-language film Vier zauberhafte Schwestern ("Four Enchanted Sisters", 2020), directed by Sven Unterwaldt Jr.

== Books ==
- Boudica's Daughters

=== The Sprite Sisters ===
1. The Circle of Power
2. The Magic Unfolds
3. The Secret of the Towers
4. The Ghost in the Tower
5. New Magic
6. The Boy With Hawk-like Eyes
7. Magic at Drysdale's School
8. The Mystery of the Locked Room
9. A Wisdom of Owls (to be published)
10. The Power of Four (to be published)
