= Senator Sheridan =

Senator Sheridan may refer to:

- John V. Sheridan (1879–1947), New York State Senate
- Thomas I. Sheridan (1890s–1960s), New York State Senate
- Upton Sheredine (1740–1800), Maryland State Senate
