= John Sheridan =

John Sheridan may refer to:

== Sports ==
- John Sheridan (footballer) (born 1964), Irish footballer
- John Sheridan (ice hockey) (born 1954), American ice hockey player
- John Sheridan (rugby league) (1933–2012), English rugby league footballer and coach
- John B. Sheridan (1870–1930), Irish American sportswriter

== Music ==
- John Sheridan (pianist) (1946–2021), American jazz pianist

== Politics ==
- John Sheridan (New Jersey government official) (1942–2014), New Jersey government official
- John Sheridan (New Brunswick politician) (1856–1932), Canadian politician in the Legislative Assembly of New Brunswick
- John Donnelly Sheridan (died 1963), Irish politician
- John E. Sheridan (politician) (1902–1987), U.S. Representative from Pennsylvania
- John V. Sheridan (1879–1947), New York politician

== Other people ==
- John Sheridan (Royal Navy officer) (c. 1778–1862), vice-admiral of the Royal Navy
- John D. Sheridan (1903–1980), Irish writer
- John Emmet Sheridan (1877–1948), American illustrator
- John F. Sheridan (1843–1908) Irish-American actor (pantomime dame) in Australia
- John T. Sheridan, US Air Force officer
- John Sheridan (editor) (1805–1858), editor of the London Morning Advertiser, migrated to South Australia 1849

== Fictional characters ==
- John Sheridan (Babylon 5), a character in the US TV science fiction series Babylon 5

== See also ==
- Jack Sheridan (disambiguation)
