= David Sheridan =

David Sheridan may refer to:

- Dave Sheridan (actor) (born 1969), American actor, comedian, and musician
- David Sheridan (Babylon 5), a fictional character in the television series Babylon 5
- Dave Sheridan (cartoonist) (1943–1982), American cartoonist
- David S. Sheridan (1908–2004), inventor of the "disposable" plastic endotracheal tube
