= Frank Sheridan =

Frank Sheridan may refer to:

- Frank Sheridan (actor) (1869–1943), American actor
- Frank Sheridan (pianist) (1898–1962), American classical pianist
