= Clare Sheridan =

English sculptor, journalist and writer

Clare Consuelo Sheridan
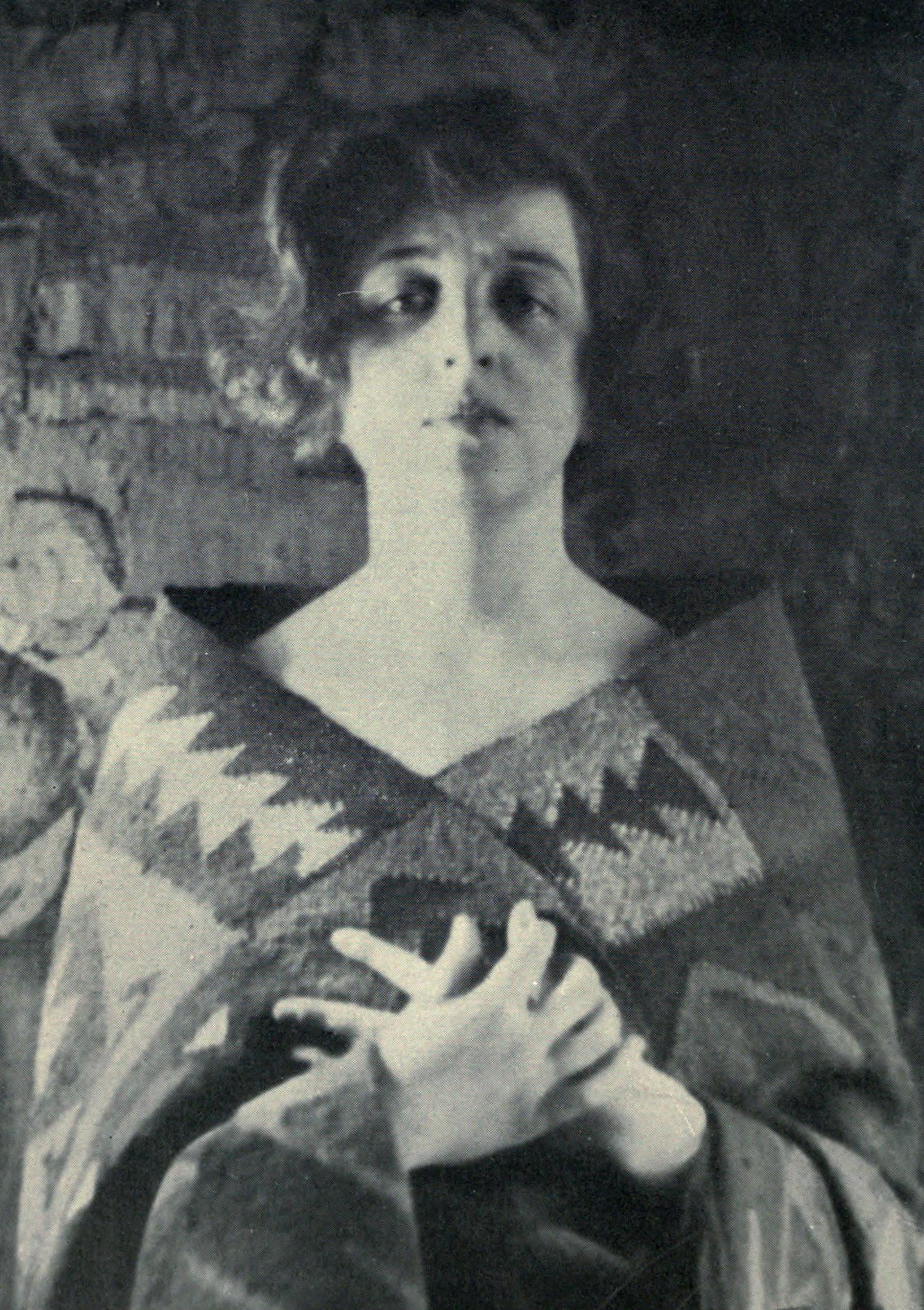
- Born: Clare Consuelo Frewen; 9 September 1885; London, England
- Died: 31 May 1970 (aged 84)
- Occupations: Sculptor and writer
- Spouse: William Frederick Temple Sheridan (m. 1910; died 1915)
- Children: Margaret Sheridan; Elizabeth Sheridan (1913–1914); Richard Brinsley Sheridan (1915–1937)
- Parent(s): Moreton Frewen; Clarita Jerome

Clare Consuelo Sheridan (née Frewen; 9 September 1885 – 31 May 1970) was an English sculptor, journalist and writer, known primarily for creating busts for famous sitters and keeping travel diaries. She was a cousin of Sir Winston Churchill, with whom she had enjoyed an amicable relationship, though her support for the October Revolution in 1917 caused them to break ranks politically. She enjoyed travelling around the world; and among her circle of friends were Princess Margaret of Sweden, Lord and Lady Mountbatten, Lady Diana Cooper, Vita Sackville-West and Vivien Leigh.

== Early life ==
Clare Consuelo Frewen was born in London, the daughter of Moreton Frewen, owner of Brede Place in Brede, East Sussex, and his American wife, the former Clarita "Clara" Jerome (1851–1935), daughter of Leonard Jerome. Her mother was the elder sister of Lady Randolph Churchill, which made Clare Frewen a maternal cousin to Winston Churchill. Her godmother and namesake was Consuelo Vanderbilt, Duchess of Marlborough. Frewen was educated by governesses at home in Sussex and at a family property in Inishannon, County Cork, before briefly attending a Paris convent school and a German finishing school. She was a debutante at the age of seventeen but turned away from that social scene to attempt to write novels. She was encouraged in this by family friends who included both Henry James and Rudyard Kipling.

She married William Frederick Temple Sheridan (1879–1915) in 1910 at St Margaret's, Westminster. They had two daughters; and, when one of them, Elizabeth, died in February 1914, Clare Sheridan made a sculpture of a small weeping angel for the child's grave. It was from this piece of art that she discovered an ability for sculpting. William Sheridan was a captain in the Rifle Brigade and was killed in the First World War while leading his men at the Battle of Loos in September 1915, a few days after the birth of the couple's third child, their son Richard. Lord Alexander Thynne, a Conservative MP and also an army officer who was killed in 1918, was reportedly a lover of Claire.

Sheridan moved from France to London to study under John Tweed and Professor Édouard Lantéri. An exhibition of her work was a success and led to a number of commissions including a bust portrait of H. H. Asquith for the Oxford Union.

== Soviet Russia ==
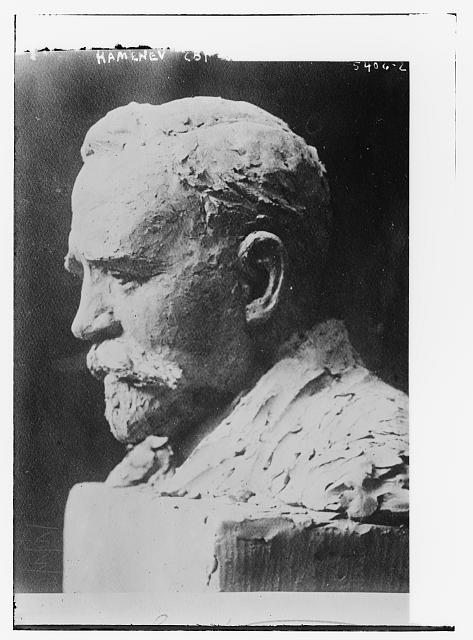
Bust of Lev Kamenev by Sheridan

In the summer of 1920, the first Soviet Russian trade delegation to visit London invited Sheridan to travel to Russia to make busts of notable revolutionaries. The British authorities refused to issue her visa but she sailed with the delegation to Stockholm where Lev Kamenev obtained an Estonian visa for her. She stayed in the Kremlin for two months, where her sculpting subjects included Vladimir Lenin, Leon Trotsky, Felix Dzerzhinsky and Kamenev. While in Russia, Sheridan is reputed to have had affairs with more than one of her sitters. Her reputed relationship with Kamenev is thought to have started the problems in his marriage to his first wife, Olga Kameneva. The author Robert Service claimed, in 2009, that there was an affair between Sheridan and Trotsky. Trotsky signed and dedicated a painting of himself to Sheridan and invited her to stay in Russia and set up a studio. During her stay, the Russian Civil War was being fought. Winston Churchill, as Secretary of State for War, was pressing for more British and allied intervention and was furious to learn of Sheridan's activities. When she returned to London, Churchill refused to see her, and after finding herself widely shunned in polite society due to her support of Bolshevism, she moved to America.

In January 1921, Sheridan and her son Richard sailed aboard the RMS Aquitania, from Southampton to New York where they arrived on 30 January 1921. Also making the crossing was Commander Hugo W. Koehler, USN, the American naval spy who was returning to America from ten months spent with the White army in the Crimea. Sheridan met Koehler on the ship, and despite her Bolshevist sympathies and his allegiance to the White Movement, they became friends. Sheridan described Koehler as "heaven sent", writing that "Koehler promised to be at my side in case of need. He was amazingly kind and put up with infinite boredom and waiting on our account." In a letter Koehler wrote in 1922, he mentioned the "famous Mrs. Sheridan at whom the Foreign Office thundered so loudly... and yet be it known (although this, of course, is closely guarded) that she was an agent for the British Intelligence Service."

== Journalism ==
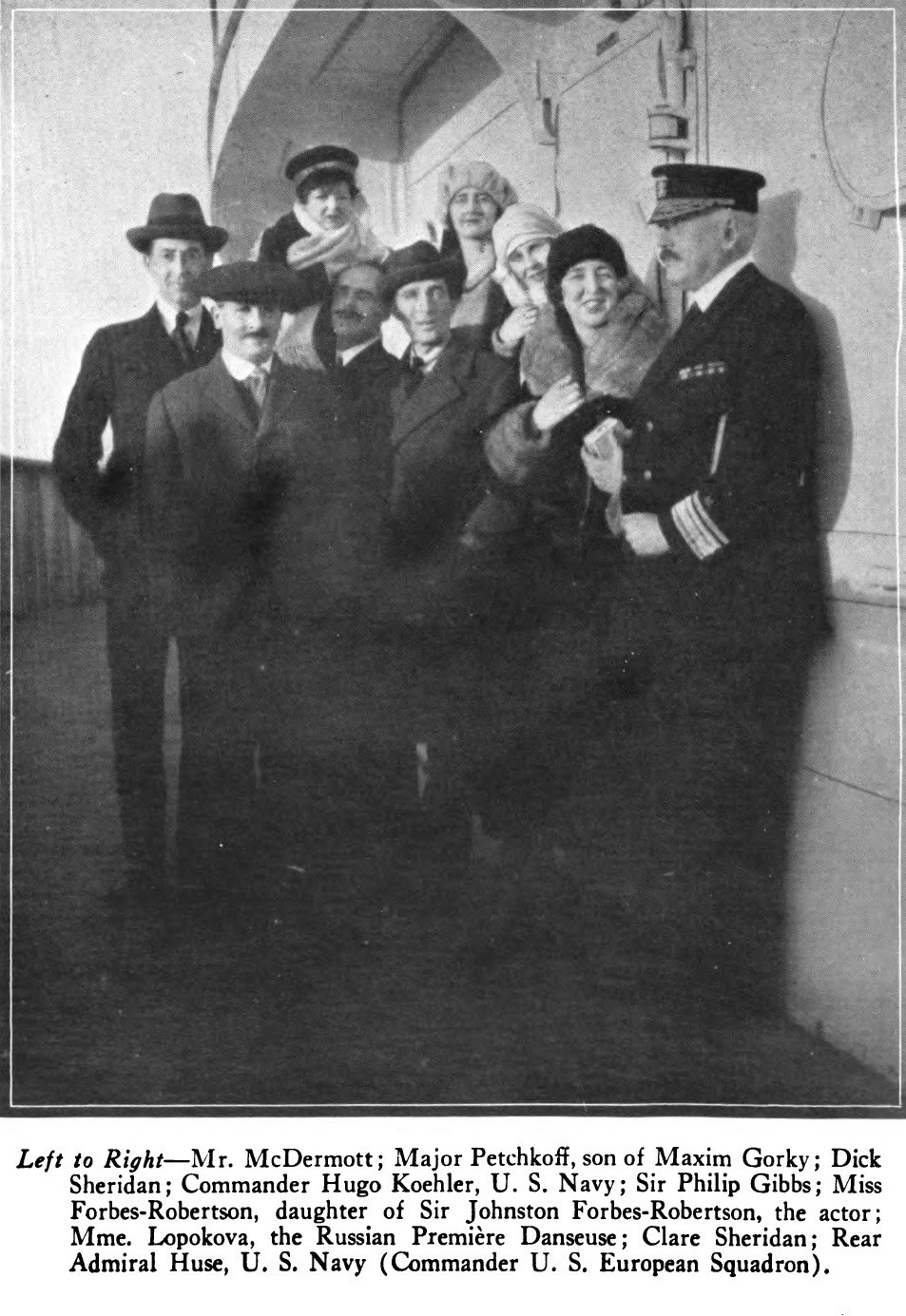
Sheridan, Hugo Koehler (holding her son, Richard) and others, aboard RMS Aquitania, January 1921

While visiting America, Sheridan had a love affair with Charlie Chaplin. She was also introduced to Herbert Swope, the editor of the New York World who, impressed by her account of her time in Russia which had been published as Russian Portraits, offered her a job as the papers' roving European correspondent. In this role she obtained a number of notable scoops for the paper. During the Irish Civil War she managed to interview both Michael Collins and Rory O'Connor. She filed vivid accounts from the occupied city of Smyrna during the Greco-Turkish War. Sheridan interviewed Aleksandar Stamboliyski in Bulgaria, Benito Mussolini in Rome and Mustafa Kemal Atatürk.

In late 1922, she turned up at the Lausanne Conference of 1922–1923 (which addressed the Greece–Turkey conflict) and embarrassed the British delegation led by Lord Curzon by attaching herself to the Italian delegation, with Italy then opposing Britain's stance. She was seen dancing with Mussolini's private secretary. As she was believed to have installed herself in a battleship under French protection at the preceding Mudania conference, with France having undermined Britain's efforts to keep the Bosphorus open, and to have had an affair with Kemal Atatürk, Curzon asked Harold Nicolson (an attending Foreign Office diplomat) to 'try and get rid of her'. Nevertheless, Vita Sackville-West (Nicolson's wife) got to hear that he 'was seeing a lot of her' and challenged him with this. She is described at this time as 'beautiful, intelligent, meddlesome, and man-mad'.

A second trip to Russia in 1923 ended in her becoming disillusioned with the course of the Revolution and she was declared 'persona non grata' in the country. Despite this, Sheridan persuaded the Soviet representative to London to issue an entry visa for her and her brother to tour the south of the country. In 1924, Sheridan and her brother, Royal Navy officer Oswald Frewen, made a then-daring long-distance motorcycle riding journey from Sussex through Europe to the USSR, ending in Odessa. The 4,226-mile (6,801 km) ride occurred between July and September 1924 with Frewen at the controls of a 799 cc, 7 hp AJS motorcycle and Sheridan in the sidecar. The AJS, nicknamed Satanella, is said to have been the first British motorcycle in the Soviet Union. Sheridan published a memoir of the journey, Across Europe with Satanella in 1925. She moved to Constantinople with her two children and gave up journalism to focus on sculpture.

Sheridan's dalliance with known Soviet agents earned her the suspicions of the Security Service. She earned an MI5 file that noted: "She has conducted herself in a disloyal manner in various foreign countries, adopting a consistently anti-British attitude." Later, in 1925, Sheridan moved to Algeria, where it was noted by MI5 that "she appeared to be comfortably off and debt-free for the first time in 10 years". She built a house on the edge of the Sahara at Biskra.

== Later life ==
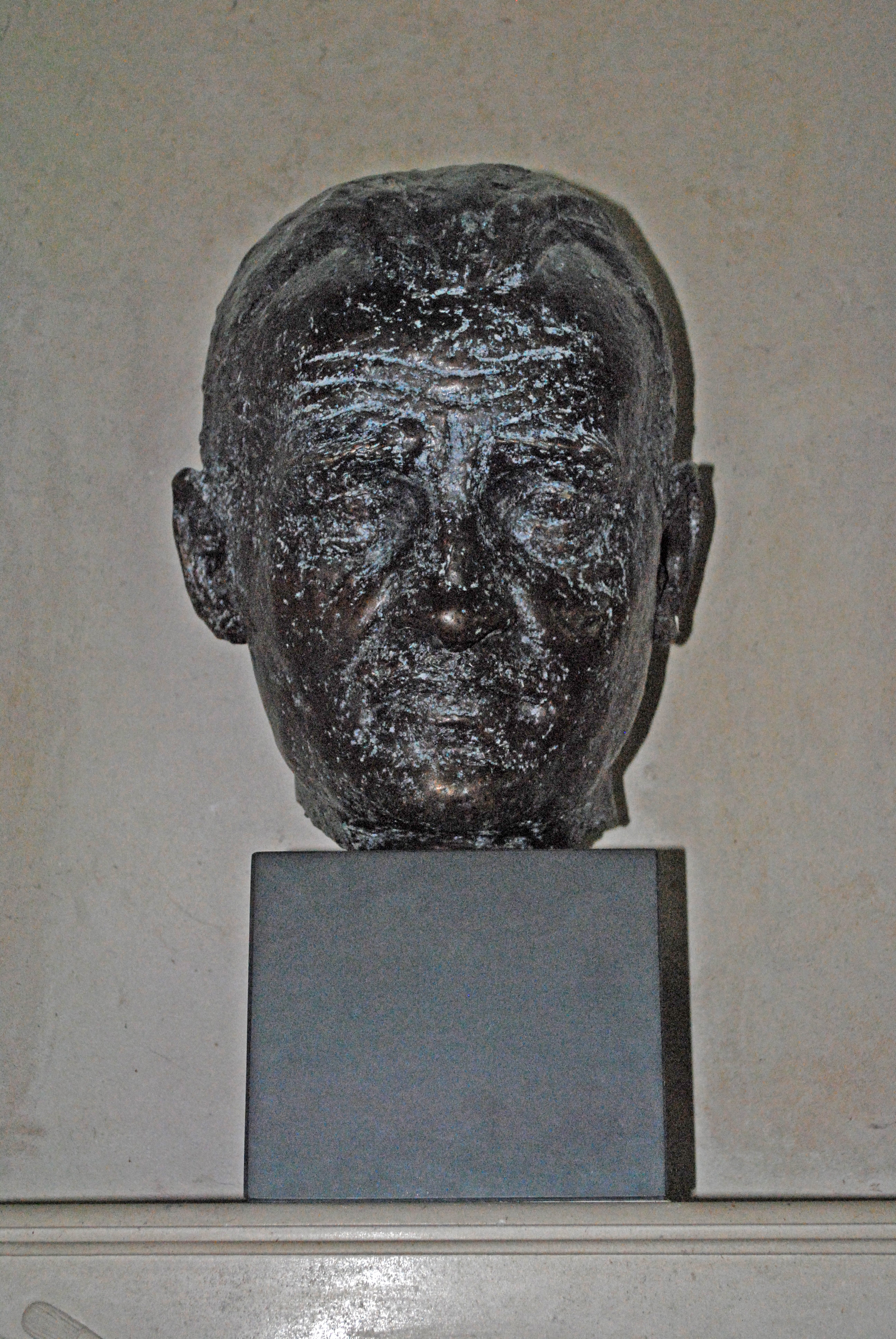
Bronze bust of Sir Oswald Birley, All Saints' Church, West Dean in East Sussex

In 1935, Sheridan’s 19-year old son, Richard Brinsley, began to make a name for himself as a writer, when he published his book Heavenly Hell: The Experiences of an Apprentice in a Four-Mast Barque, describing his ten-months in Gustaf Erikson’s windjammer Lawhill. He died of appendicitis in 1937 at Constantine in Algeria. His mother took a large oak tree from the family home, Brede Place, in Sussex and carved it into his memorial. Carving in wood seems to have given her a fresh artistic direction. In the same year, she spent a summer at the artists' colony at Glacier National Park, established by Winold Reiss, and travelled among the Blackfeet.

Sheridan had a well-received exhibition in London of the carvings she made there from tree trunks. During World War Two she and Winston Churchill put aside their political differences and she made a bust portrait of him whilst he painted her portrait. After the war she converted to Roman Catholicism, travelling to Assisi for that purpose before moving to live in a guest house run by the Franciscan convent at Hope Castle at Castleblayney in Ireland. From there, she continued to sculpt, albeit subjects and icons of religious importance before returning to live in Belmont House in Hastings, Sussex in 1956. In 1958 she sculpted a life-size figure head of a helmsman for the Hastings Fishermen's Museum.

== Death ==
She died in 1970 at the age of 84, having outlived two of her three children. She is buried in the churchyard of St George's, Brede, Sussex beside her nephew Roger Frewen [d 1972] and her great-niece Selina Frewen [d 1972] and near the memorial she had carved to her son.

== Surviving artworks ==
Sheridan's busts of her first cousin Churchill can be found at Blenheim Palace, Chartwell, Harrow School and Hastings Town Hall; the original plaster is in the possession of her great-nephew Jonathan Frewen. Some items from her large collection of Native American artefacts are on display at Hastings Museum and in the Frewen family's ancestral village of Brede in Sussex. Sheridan's sculptures are often shown at Rye Art Gallery. Several of her later works can be found in churches or churchyards, for example at Peper Harrow near Guildford, at St Catherine's in Hoogstraeten in Belgium, at the Church of Christ the King, Salthill in Galway, Ireland and at Allington Castle in Maidstone.

== Written works ==
- Russian Portraits (Cape, 1921); published in the U.S. as Mayfair to Moscow: Clare Sheridan's Diary (1921)
- My American Diary (New York, Boni and Liveright, 1922)
- In Many Places (Cape, 1923)
- West to East (1923)
- Stella Defiant (Duckworth, 1923)
- Across Europe with Satanella (Dodd, Mead and Company, 1925)
- The Thirteenth (Duckworth, 1925)
- A Turkish Kaleidoscope (Duckworth, 1926)
- Nuda Veritas (Butterworth, 1927); published in the US as Naked Truth (New York, Harper & Brothers, 1928)
- Green Amber (1929)
- The Substitute Bride (1931)
- Arab Interlude (1936)
- Redskin Interlude (1938)
- Without End (1939)
- My Crowded Sanctuary (Methuen, 1945)
- To the Four Winds (1957)
