= Cathal Sheridan =

Cathal Sheridan may refer to:

- Cathal Sheridan (dual player), Irish player of Gaelic football and hurling
- Cathal Sheridan (rugby union), Irish rugby union player
