= Jack Sheridan (footballer) =

Australian rules footballer

Personal information
- Full name: John Barber Sheridan
- Born: 18 September 1898; Geelong, Victoria
- Died: 15 August 1930 (aged 31); Elsternwick, Victoria

Playing career^{1}
Years	Club	Games (Goals)
1918	Geelong	1 (0)
- ^{1} Playing statistics correct to the end of 1918.

John Barber Sheridan (18 September 1898 – 15 August 1930) was an Australian rules footballer who played with Geelong in the Victorian Football League (VFL).
