= Tony Sheridan (disambiguation) =

Tony Sheridan (1940–2013) was a musician.

Tony Sheridan may also refer to:

- Tony Sheridan (footballer)
- Tony Sheridan, on the List of mayors of Wyong Shire
