= Sheridan Delépine =

Swiss bacteriologist

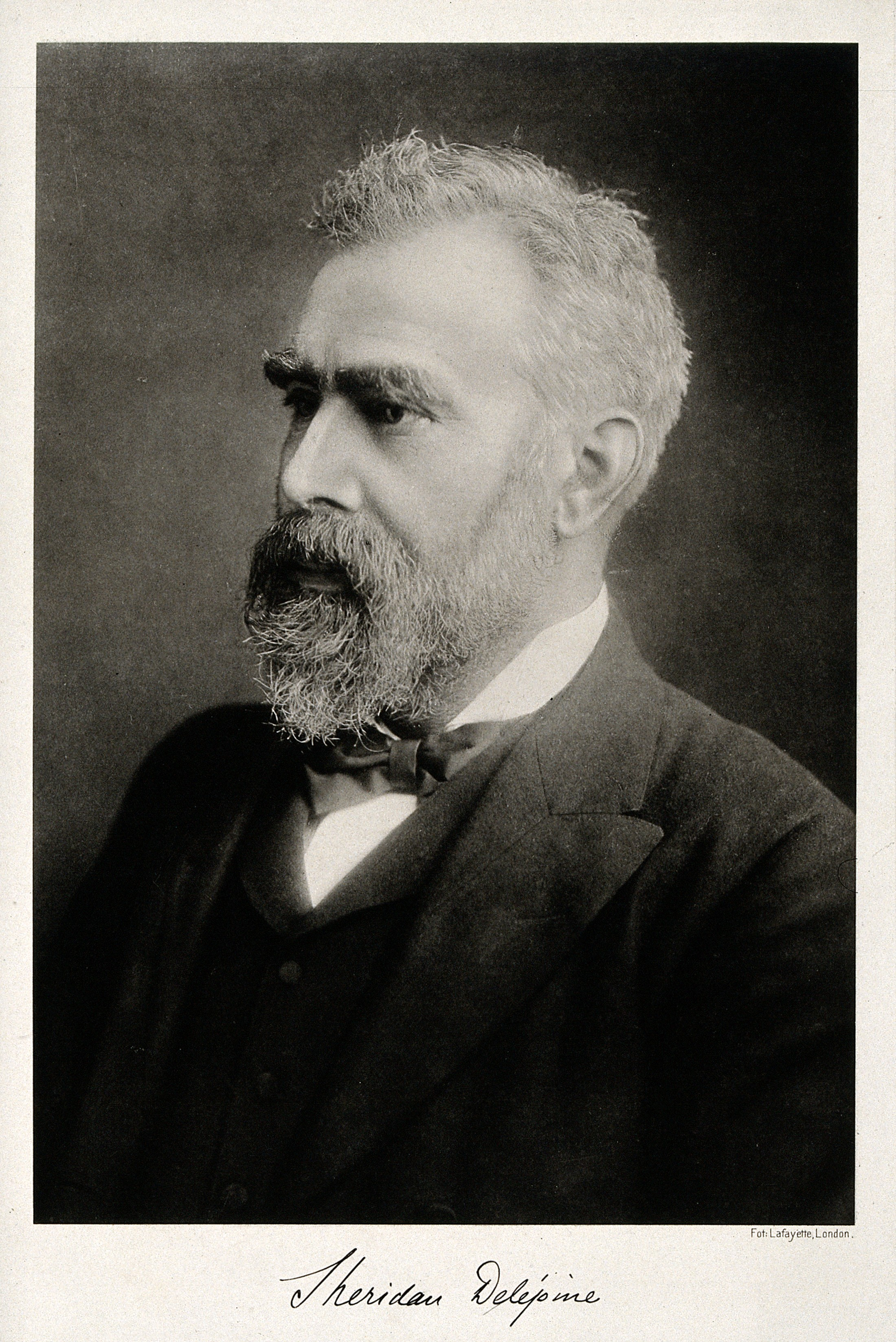
- Born: 1855
- Died: 1921 (aged 65–66)
- Organization(s): Owens College, Manchester

A. Sheridan Delépine (1855-1921) was a Swiss bacteriologist and pathologist.

== Early life and education ==
He was born in Perroy to a French father and Swiss mother. He graduated with a B.Sc. from the University of Geneva in 1872, followed by medical studies at the University of Edinburgh Medical School, where he earned his M.B., C.M. in 1882, and in 1905 was awarded an M.Sc. by the Victoria University of Manchester.

== Career ==
He was professor of pathology and bacteriology at Owens College, Manchester and then at the Victoria University of Manchester. Delépine was appointed when Julius Dreschfeld moved from pathology to a chair in the principles and practice of medicine in 1891; Delépine became the first Procter professor of pathology and morbid anatomy. His Swiss accent made understanding his lectures rather hard, but his reputation among the students was high. He organized the work of his department with great energy and then organized and opened a public health laboratory in 1891. This laboratory contributed much to the investigation of public health and problems of sanitation. Medical students were taught practical hygiene and bacteriology in the laboratory and could obtain a diploma in public health. Delépine was from 1891 to 1910 professor of comparative pathology and bacteriology (he also taught pathology 1891–1904), during this time he was elected to the membership of Manchester Literary and Philosophical Society on 6 March 1894 later professor of public health and bacteriology from 1910 to 1921.

== Selected publications ==
- Delepine, AS (1897). "The Technique of "Serum Diagnosis," with Special Reference to Typhoid Fever". Br Med J. 1 (1894): 967–70. doi:10.1136/bmj.1.1894.967. PMC 2433442. PMID 20756933.
- Delépine, AS (1896). "An Address Delivered at the Opening of the Section of Pathology". Br Med J. 2 (1858): 309–12. PMC 2510180. PMID 20756379.
- Delépine, S (1901). "The Communicability of Human Tuberculosis to Cattle". Br Med J. 2 (2130): 1224–6. PMC 2507352. PMID 20759853.
- A. Sheridan Delépine and E.J. Sidebotham. On the "sero-diagnosis" of typhoid fever (1896)

== See also ==
- November 1900#November 17, 1900 (Saturday)
