= Chris Sheridan =

Chris Sheridan is the name of:

- Chris Sheridan (director), Canadian filmmaker
- Chris Sheridan (writer) (born 1967), American screenwriter, producer, and voice actor
- Chris Sheridan (sportswriter) (born 1965), sportswriter, formerly for ESPN
- Chris Sheridan (guitarist/musician), guitarist for Simplified
