= Margaret Sheridan (writer) =

British writer (1912–1976)

Mary Margaret Motley Sheridan, Comtesse de Renéville (6 January 1912 – 15 July 1976) was a British-French writer who wrote under the name Mary Motley. She was the daughter of sculptor Clare Sheridan.

== Life ==
Born in 1912, her father, Captain Wilfred Sheridan was killed at the Battle of Loos on 25 September 1915. A sister died in infancy. She accompanied her mother to live in America in her early years.

Sheridan spent some time in Biskra, Algeria, where, in 1937, her brother Richard died of appendicitis, aged twenty-one, and she travelled extensively in the Saharan region. In 1935 she married Comte Guy de Renéville, an officer in the French army, and later Chef de Cabinet Militaire to the Governor General of French Equatorial Africa.

She wrote autobiographies about her time in Algeria and the French Congo. Her mother died in 1970, and by then she lived in the South of France. When Margaret died in 1976 her copyrights reverted to Jonathan Frewen, who had inherited her mother's copyrights in 1972 from his father Roger Frewen, who was Clare Sheridan's nephew.

== Bibliography ==
- Devils in Waiting (1959)
- Morning Glory (1961)
- Home to Numidia (1964)
