= Thomas Sheridan =

Thomas Sheridan may refer to:

- Thomas Sheridan (divine) (1687–1738), Anglican divine
- Thomas Sheridan (actor) (1719–1788), Irish actor and teacher of elocution
- Thomas Sheridan (soldier) (1775–1817/18)
- Thomas B. Sheridan (born 1931), American engineer
- Thomas Sheridan (politician) (1640s–1712), Chief Secretary for Ireland
- Tommy Sheridan (born 1964), Scottish socialist politician
- Sir Thomas Sheridan (Jacobite), advisor in the Jacobite rising of 1745
- Tom Sheridan (handballer), Gaelic handball player
- Tom Sheridan (footballer) (born 1993), Australian rules footballer
- Thomas I. Sheridan (c. 1890 – c. 1962), American lawyer and politician from New York
- Thomas Sheridan (anthropologist) (born 1951), anthropologist of Sonora, Mexico
