= James Sheridan =

James or Jim Sheridan may refer to:

- Jim Sheridan (politician) (1952–2022), Scottish Labour Party politician
- James Sheridan (footballer) (1882–1960), Irish footballer in England
- James Sheridan (Medal of Honor) (1830–1893), American Civil War sailor
- James E. Sheridan (1922–2015), professor of history and author
- Jim Sheridan (born 1949), Irish film director
- Jamey Sheridan (James Patrick Sheridan, born 1951), American actor
- James Joseph Sheridan (1951–2014), Irish pianist, composer, arranger and music historian
