= Sheridan High School =

Sheridan High School is a common school name in the United States:

- Sheridan High School (Arkansas) — Sheridan, Arkansas
- Sheridan High School (Colorado) — Sheridan, Colorado
- Sheridan High School (Indiana) — Sheridan, Indiana
- Sheridan High School (Montana) — Sheridan, Montana
- Sheridan High School (Thornville, Ohio) — Thornville, Ohio
- Sheridan High School (Oregon) — Sheridan, Oregon
- Sheridan High School (Wyoming) — Sheridan, Wyoming
