= Eileen Sheridan =

Eileen Sheridan may refer to:

- Eileen Sheridan (model) (1936–2018), British beauty pageant contestant
- Eileen Sheridan (cyclist) (1923–2023), English cyclist
