= Amy Sheridan =

CW4 Amy Sheridan was the first American woman officer to command a United States military aviation company stationed outside of the United States and the first Jewish woman to become a career aviator in the United States Armed Services.

== Biography ==
Sheridan was born in Newton, Massachusetts. She began her aviation training by working for a flight school in exchange for flight lessons.

In 1976, Sheridan joined the Women's Army Corps which was incorporated into the regular United States Army in 1978. She started her military career as a crew member at Fort Benning and by 1977 rose to crew chief.

Sheridan attended Warrant Officer Flight Training at Fort Rucker's Army Aviation Center. She became an officer and aviator after completing her training in December 1979 making her the first American Jewish woman to gain aviator status in any branch of the Armed Services. Other Jewish women including Selma Cronan had previously been aviators and members Women's Airforce Service Pilots, but were considered volunteers and not official members of the military.

Sheridan piloted helicopters and airplanes in the Western Hemisphere, Europe, and Asia for more than twenty years. She commanded helicopters for the VII Corps Aviation Company in Stuttgart, Germany making her the first woman to command an aviation company stationed outside of the United States. She was also aircraft commander of the United States Military's first all-woman reconnaissance flight crew while stationed in Korea.

In 1999, Sheridan retired from the Army as a Chief Warrant Officer 4 and became a teacher and school counselor.

She was injured in an automobile accident caused by a drunk driver in 2004 and is no longer able to fly.
