= Peter Sheridan (disambiguation) =

Peter Sheridan (born 1952) is an Irish playwright, screenwriter and director.

Peter Sheridan may also refer to:

- Peter Sheridan (police officer), charity executive and former police officer in Northern Ireland
- Peter G. Sheridan (born 1950), United States federal judge
