= Judge Sheridan =

Judge Sheridan may refer to:

- Michael Henry Sheridan (1912–1976), judge of the United States District Court for the Middle District of Pennsylvania
- Peter G. Sheridan (born 1950), judge of the United States District Court for the District of New Jersey
