= Michael K. Sheridan =

United States Marine Corps general

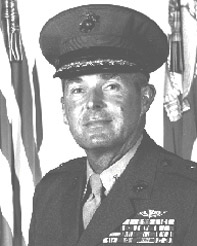
- Brigadier General Michael Sheridan
- Born: September 26, 1934 (age 92); Chicago, Illinois, U.S.
- Military career
- Allegiance: United States of America
- Branch: United States Marine Corps
- Rank: Brigadier General
- Commands: Headquarters Marine Corps
- Conflicts: Korean War; Vietnam War
- Awards: Defense Superior Service Medal; Legion of Merit; Meritorious Service Medal; Joint Services Commendation Medal

Michael K. Sheridan (born September 26, 1934) is a retired Brigadier General in the U.S. Marine Corps. His last post was to serve as the Director of Policies and Operations Department, Headquarters Marine Corps in Washington, D.C.

Prior to that position he served as Director of Facilities and Services Division at Headquarters Marine Corps. Sheridan also served as Deputy Commanding General for the Marine Corps Recruit Depot, located at Parris Island, South Carolina.

== Education ==
Sheridan received a bachelor's degree in geology from Florida State University in 1956. He earned a master's degree in management from George Washington University in 1966.

== Awards and decorations ==
General Sheridan has been awarded the following, along with numerous unit, service and campaign awards:

Legion of Merit
Meritorious Service Medal
Defense Superior Service Medal
Joint Services Commendation Medal
