= Bill Sheridan =

American football coach (born 1959)

Jacksonville Jaguars
- Title: Senior defensive assistant

Personal information
- Born: January 27, 1959 (age 67); Detroit, Michigan, U.S.

Career information
- High school: Detroit (MI) De La Salle
- College: Grand Valley State

Career history
- Shrine Catholic HS (MI) (1981–1984) Assistant coach; Michigan (1985–1986) Graduate assistant; Maine (1987–1988) Linebackers coach; Cincinnati (1989–1991) Linebackers coach; Army (1992–1995) Linebackers coach; Army (1996–1997) Defensive backs coach; Michigan State (1998–2000) Linebackers coach; Notre Dame (2001) Safeties coach & special teams coordinator; Michigan (2002–2004) Linebackers coach & defensive line coach; New York Giants (2005–2008) Linebackers coach; New York Giants (2009) Defensive coordinator; Miami Dolphins (2010–2011) Linebackers coach; Tampa Bay Buccaneers (2012–2013) Defensive coordinator; Detroit Lions (2014–2017) Linebackers coach; Boston College (2018) Linebackers coach; Boston College (2019) Defensive coordinator & linebackers coach; Air Force (2020–2021) Defensive line coach; Belleville HS (MI) (2022) Defensive coordinator; Arlington Renegades (2023–2024) Linebackers coach; Jacksonville Jaguars (2025–present) Senior defensive assistant

Awards and highlights
- Super Bowl champion (XLII); XFL champion (2023)
- Coaching profile at Pro Football Reference

William Sheridan (born January 27, 1959) is an American football coach who is a senior defensive assistant for the Jacksonville Jaguars of the National Football League (NFL). He was previously the defensive coordinator for the Tampa Bay Buccaneers and was also a coach for a number of college teams, including Notre Dame, Army, and Michigan State. From 2005 to 2008 he was the linebackers coach for the NFL's New York Giants. In 2009, he was the defensive coordinator for the New York Giants. He had stints with the Miami Dolphins, Tampa Bay Buccaneers and Detroit Lions before returning to NCAA football at Boston College in 2018. After two years there, he was hired by Air Force to be their new defensive line coach beginning in 2020. He also recently served as the linebackers coach for the Arlington Renegades of the United Football League (UFL)

== Coaching career ==
Sheridan's coaching career began in 1981 in Shrine High School in Royal Oak, Michigan, where he was the football coach until 1984. In 1987, he moved to the college level and became the linebacker coach for Maine, followed by Cincinnati and Army. In 1996, he shifted to defensive line coach at West Point. He had been on Lloyd Carr's staff at the University of Michigan the previous three years before his stint with the Giants, serving as both the linebackers coach and then as coach of the defensive line.

Prior to being the defensive coordinator he was the Giants linebackers coach. Sheridan replaced Steve Spagnuolo after he left to take the head coaching position with the St. Louis Rams. Sheridan had been the linebackers coach for the Giants for the previous four seasons after his hiring in 2005. Giants head coach Tom Coughlin promoted Sheridan over secondary coach Peter Giunta. He was fired on January 4, 2010, after the Giants defense slipped as the team dropped 8 of their last 11 games and allowed 40 points on five different occasions, a franchise record.

On January 19, 2010, Sheridan was hired by the Miami Dolphins to coach their inside linebackers.

On February 17, 2012, the Tampa Bay Buccaneers hired Sheridan as their defensive coordinator. He was relieved of his duties on January 2, 2014.

On January 1, 2014, Sheridan agreed to become the linebackers coach for the Detroit Lions.

In June, 2016, Sheridan was named to Sports Illustrated's Dream Coaching Team for the NFL for Linebackers.

In 2018, Sheridan became a coach for Boston College, beginning as a defensive backs coach and ending as their defensive coordinator.

In 2020, Sheridan was named defensive line coach for Air Force Falcons.

On February 22, 2022, Sheridan was named the inside linebackers coach for the Wisconsin Badgers. He resigned in May 2022 after coming under investigation by the NCAA for recruiting violations during his tenure at Air Force.

On September 13, 2022, Sheridan was officially hired by the Arlington Renegades.
