= Women in the United States military =

Women in the United States military can refer to:

- Women in the United States Armed Forces
  - Women in the United States Army
  - Women in the United States Marine Corps
  - Women in the United States Navy
  - Women in the United States Air Force
  - Women in the United States Space Force
  - Women in the United States Coast Guard

== See also ==
- Women in the military
- Women in the military by country
- Women in the military in the Americas
