= Women in the United States Marine Corps =

There have been women in the United States Marine Corps since 1918, and women continue to serve in the Corps today.

== History ==
Note that some minor wars women served in have been omitted from this history.

=== Prior to World War I ===
Lucy Brewer (or Eliza Bowen, or Louisa Baker) is the pen name of a writer who purported to be the first woman in the United States Marines, serving aboard the USS Constitution as a sharpshooter in the 1800s while pretending to be a man named George Baker. Brewer's adventures were probably written by Nathaniel Hill Wright or Wright's publisher, Nathaniel Coverly. No one by the name of Lucy Brewer (or that of her other pseudonyms, or that of her husband) can be found in historical records; in addition, it is highly unlikely a woman could have disguised herself for three years on the Constitution, as the crew had little to no privacy. (For example, no toilet facilities or private quarters existed on the ship, and physical examinations were thorough in the Marines.) In addition, Brewer's book The Female Marine's identifying details of the Constitution's travels and battles are nearly verbatim to accounts published by the ship's commanders in contemporary newspapers.

=== World War I ===
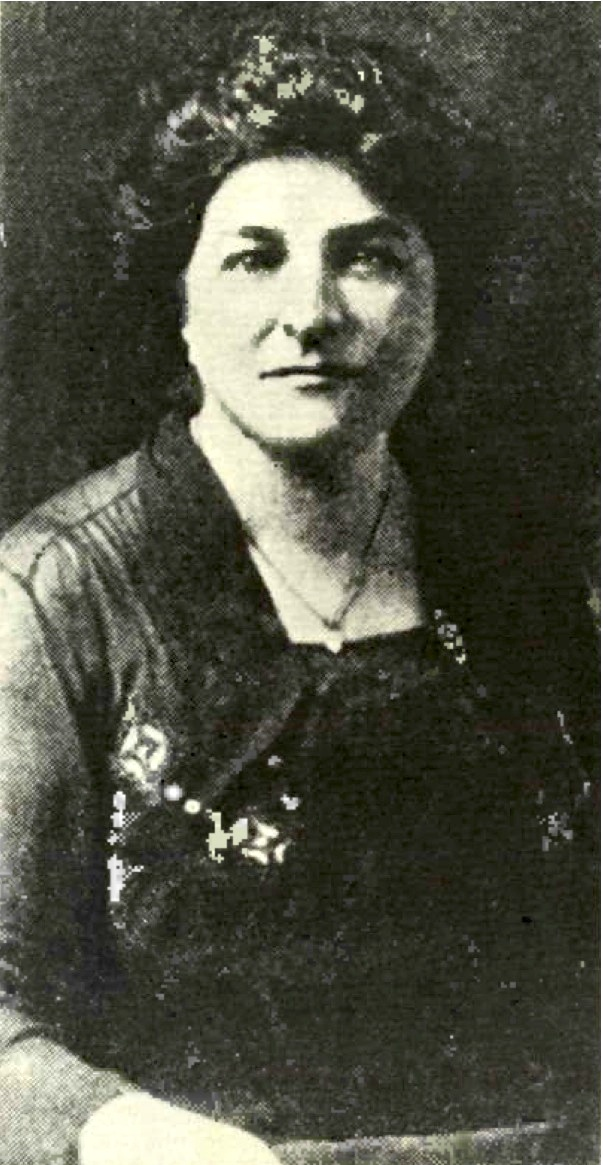
Opha May Johnson was the first known woman to enlist in the Marines. She joined the Marine Corps Reserve in 1918, officially becoming the first female Marine.

Opha May Johnson was the first known woman to enlist in the Marines. She joined the Marine Corps Reserve on August 13, 1918, during America's involvement in World War I, officially becoming the first female Marine. From then until the end of World War I, 305 women enlisted in the Marines. They were often nicknamed "Marinettes", and helped with the office duties at the Headquarters Marine Corps, so the men who usually worked the administrative roles could be sent to France to help fight in the war.

=== World War II and the late 1940s ===
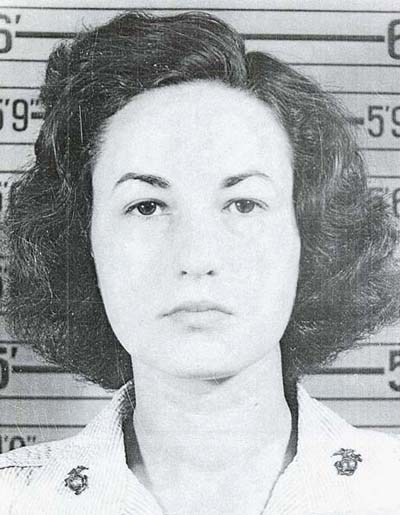
Bea Arthur's U.S. Marine Corps photo; she served during World War II.

The Marine Corps created the Marine Corps Women's Reserve in 1943, during America's involvement in World War II. Ruth Cheney Streeter was its first director. Over 20,000 women Marines served in World War II, in over 225 different specialties, filling 85 percent of the enlisted jobs at Headquarters Marine Corps and comprising one-half to two-thirds of the permanent personnel at major Marine Corps posts.

The demobilization plan for the Marine Corps Women's Reserve called for mandatory resignation or discharge of all Reserve members by 1 September 1946. However, by August 1946, some 300 women had been asked by the Marine Corps to stay on, even as the last of the Reserve's barracks was being closed. For the next two years, these women served the Marine Corps in an undetermined status. In 1948, the Women's Armed Services Integration Act gave women permanent status in the Regular and Reserve forces of the Marines.

=== Korean War ===
During the Korean War the number of women Marines serving peaked at 2,787. Most of them served as part of the clerical and administrative staff, in an effort to free male Marines of stateside duties so those men could join overseas combat.

=== Vietnam War ===
In 1967, Public Law 90-130 was signed into law; it removed legal ceilings on women's promotions that had kept them out of the general and flag ranks, and dropped the two percent ceiling on officer and enlisted strengths for women in the armed forces.

Also in 1967, Master Sergeant Barbara Dulinsky became the first female Marine to serve in a combat zone in Vietnam.

At the peak of the Vietnam War, there were approximately 2,700 women Marines on active duty, serving both stateside and overseas.

=== Middle East conflicts ===
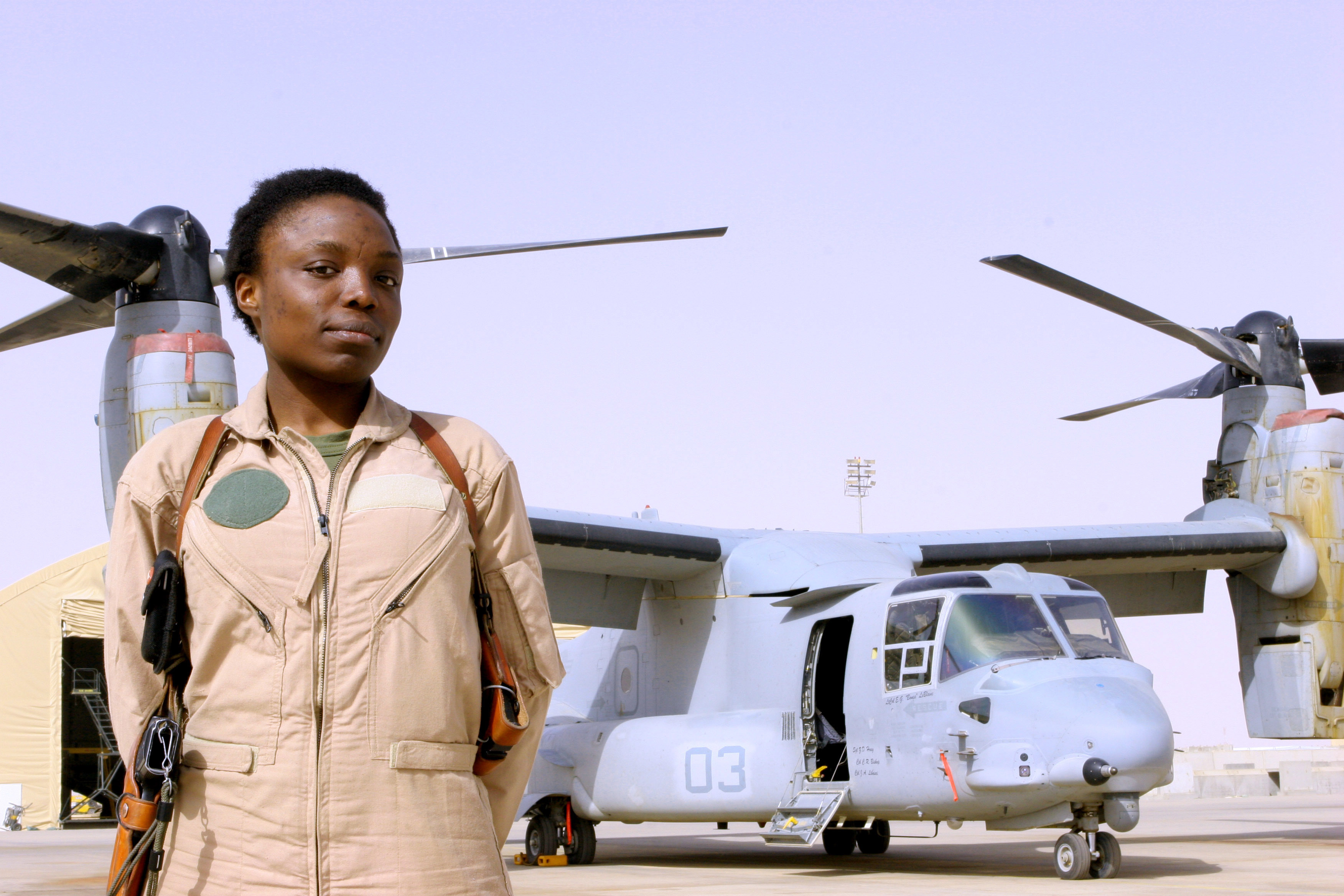
Captain Elizabeth A. Okoreeh-Baah, the first female MV-22 Osprey pilot, stands on the flight line in Al Asad, Iraq after a combat operation on March 12, 2008.

One thousand female Marines were deployed for Operation Desert Storm (1990) and Operation Desert Shield (1990–1991).

Female Marines served in the Iraq War from 2003 until 2011.

Female marines also served in the Afghanistan War that began in 2001 and ended in 2021, and the American-led combat intervention in Iraq that began in 2014 and ended in 2021.

=== Other ===
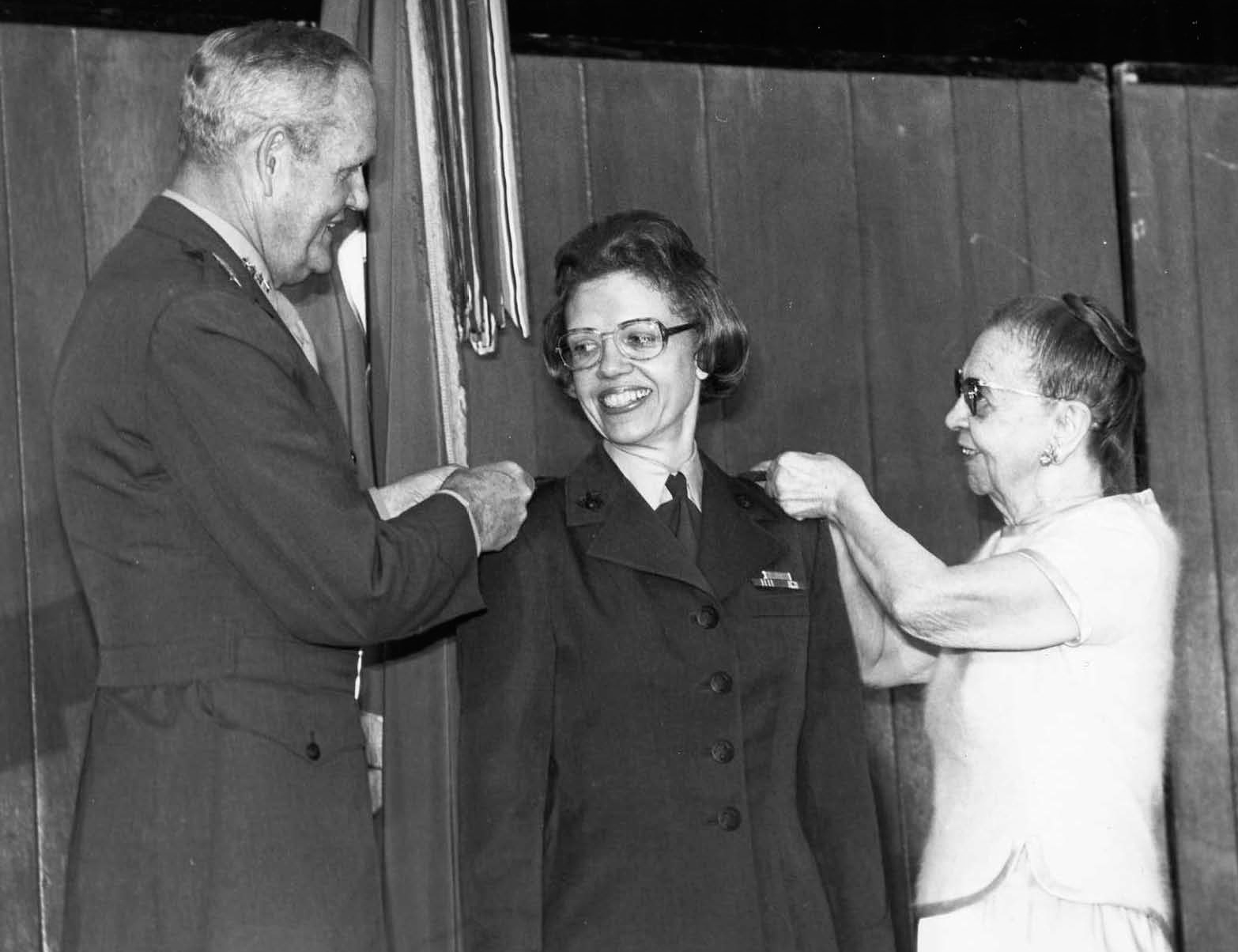
Margaret A. Brewer's promotion ceremony to the rank of brigadier general, on May 11, 1978.

On May 11, 1978, Margaret A. Brewer became the first female general officer in the Marine Corps.

In December 2020, Marine Corps Recruit Depot San Diego agreed to join Marine Corps Recruit Depot Parris Island in accepting female recruits, with 60 female recruits starting their boot camp training at the San Diego depot in February 2021. By February 2021, both the San Diego and Parris Island depots had female drill instructors training female recruits. 53 of the 60 recruits would successfully graduate from boot camp in April 2021 and become Marines.

Susan Livingstone served as the first female Acting United States Secretary of the Navy from January 24 to February 7 of 2003. Although this is a civilian position, it is included in this article because the Secretary of the Navy is the civilian leader of the Marine Corps (and the Navy).

As of 2020, women made up 8.9% of total active duty Marines.

== Diversity of women in the Marine Corps ==
Marine Commandant Gen. Robert Neller said accessions of female and minority officers into the service reached 33 percent in the fiscal year of 2016, an increase of about ten percentage points from previous years. Additionally, a 2016 study of enlisted recruits showed that in the Marine Corps, while nearly seventy percent of enlisted recruit females were white, this was followed by Hispanic women, who accounted for twenty percent.

In early 2018, Col. Lorna M. Mahlock became the first Black woman to be nominated as a Brigadier general (one star) in the United States Marine Corps. In December 2022, she received her second star and became the first Black female Major General in the U.S. Marine Corps.

== Issues for women within the Corps ==
=== Combat exclusions and women in combat (1993–present) ===
On April 28, 1993, combat exclusion was lifted from aviation positions by Les Aspin, permitting women to serve in almost any aviation capacity.

In 1994, the Pentagon declared:

Service members are eligible to be assigned to all positions for which they are qualified, except that women shall be excluded from assignment to units below the brigade level whose primary mission is to engage in direct combat on the ground.

That policy also excluded women being assigned to certain organizations based upon proximity to direct combat or "collocation" as the policy specifically referred to it. According to the Army, collocation occurs when "the position or unit routinely physically locates and remains with a military unit assigned a doctrinal mission to routinely engage in direct combat."

In 2013, former Secretary of Defense Leon Panetta removed the military's ban on women serving in combat, overturning the 1994 rule. Panetta's decision gave the military services until January 2016 to seek special exceptions if they believed any positions must remain closed to women. The services had until May 2013 to draw up a plan for opening all units to women and until the end of 2015 to actually implement it. In 2015 Joseph Dunford, the commandant of the Marine Corps, recommended that women be excluded from competing for certain front-line combat jobs. That year a U.S. official confirmed that the Marine Corps had requested to keep some combat jobs open only to men. However, in December 2015, Defense Secretary Ash Carter stated that starting in 2016 all combat jobs would open to women. In March 2016, Ash Carter approved final plans from military service branches and the U.S. Special Operations Command to open all combat jobs to women, and authorized the military to begin integrating female combat soldiers "right away."

Also in 2016, a female lance corporal in the Marines requested a lateral move into an infantry "military occupational specialty," making her the first female Marine to sign up for the infantry.

In 2017, there were several women breaking combat-related barriers in the Marine Corps. On the enlisted side, PFC Maria Daume, who was born in a Siberian prison and later adopted by Americans, became the first female Marine to join the infantry through the traditional entry-level training process. On the officer side, First Lt. Marina A. Hierl became the first woman to graduate from the infantry officer course of the Marine Corps, and Second Lt. Mariah Klenke became the first female officer to graduate from the Marines' Assault Amphibian Officer course.

=== Sexism and sexual harassment ===
Frontiero v. Richardson, 411 U.S. 677 (1973), was a landmark Supreme Court case (Note: Technically, the case was decided under the Fifth Amendment's Due Process Clause, not under the Equal Protection Clause of the Fourteenth Amendment, since the latter applies not to the federal government but to the states. However, because Bolling v. Sharpe, through the doctrine of reverse incorporation, made the standards of the Equal Protection Clause applicable to the federal government, it was for practical purposes an addition not to due process, but rather to equal protection jurisprudence.) which decided that benefits given by the military to the family of service members cannot be given out differently because of sex.

In 1991 the Tailhook scandal occurred, in which Marine Corps (and Navy) aviators were accused of sexually assaulting 83 women (and 7 men) at the Tailhook convention in Las Vegas.

In early 2017 a nude photo scandal occurred; initially it was reported that the scandal was contained to only the Marine Corps, but the scandal later involved the rest of the U.S. military. The scandal caused the Corps to ensue multiple investigations on over 80 Marine personnel, as well as addressing the culture of sexual harassment within the Marine Corps.

In the 2017 annual report on sexual assault in the United States military, there were 998 reported cases of sexual assault in the Marine Corps, up 14.9% from the year before. Pentagon officials said that the increased percentage was due to the greater awareness of administrative and legal options given to victims, giving them more confidence to speak out.

=== Sexual orientation and gender identity policy ===
Before the "Don't Ask Don't Tell" policy was enacted in 1993, lesbians and bisexual women (and gay men and bisexual men) were banned from serving in the military. In 1993 the "Don't Ask Don't Tell" policy was enacted, which mandated that the military could not ask service members about their sexual orientation. However, until the policy was ended in 2011 service members were still expelled from the military if they engaged in sexual conduct with a member of the same sex, stated that they were lesbian, gay, or bisexual, and/or married or attempted to marry someone of the same sex.

According to scholars, since at least as early as 1960, Executive Order 10450 was applied to ban transgender individuals from serving in the United States military. On May 17, 1963, gender transitioned or transitioning individuals were officially prohibited from the United States military by Army Regulation 40-501. This policy reasoned transgender people were medically unqualified to serve because their mental state was considered unfit. Later, after varying restrictions over the years, there stopped being restrictions on people serving in the military due to their being transgender when President Joe Biden signed the "Executive Order on Enabling All Qualified Americans to Serve Their Country in Uniform" on January 25, 2021. However, Executive Order 14183, titled "Prioritizing Military Excellence and Readiness", an executive order issued by President Donald Trump on January 27, 2025, again banned transgender people from military service. In March 2025, a federal judge blocked the Executive Order; but in May of that year the Supreme Court allowed the Trump administration to reinstate the ban while legal challenges continue in the Ninth Circuit.

== Female Marines in fiction ==
- Marine Corps Yumi, a manga and webcomic illustrated by Takeshi Nogami about the lives of four female Marines, based on the former Marine author Anastasia Moreno‘s experiences.

== See also ==
- Women in the military
- Women in the United States Marine Corps Reserve
- Women in the United States Army
- Women in the United States Navy
- Women in the United States Air Force
- Women in the United States Coast Guard
- Women in the United States Space Force
