= Olga Kokovtseva =

Russian soldier

Margarita Romanovna Kokovtseva, generally named in English sources as Olga Kokovtseva, was a female soldier in an Imperial Russian Army cavalry unit during World War I. Wounded in combat and decorated for bravery, she appears to have been involved with establishing a hospital for injured servicemen.

English-language sources state that she rose to the rank of captain or even colonel in the 6th Ural Cossack Regiment, but this may be through confusion with Mme. Col. Alexandra Kudasheva, the female commanding officer of that unit.

== Sources ==
- Russian version of her biography (in Russian)
- English version.
- Scholarly article mentioning Margarita Kokovtseva. (login required)
