= Barbara Dulinsky =

United States Marine

- Born: Barbara Jean Dulinsky; 18 October 1928; San Francisco, California, U.S.
- Died: 28 March 1995 (aged 66) Kent, Washington, U.S.
- Allegiance: United States of America
- Branch: United States Marine Corps
- Service years: 1950–1970
- Rank: Master Sergeant
- Commands: States Marine Corps
- Conflicts: Vietnam War

Master Sergeant Barbara Jean Dulinsky (18 October 1928 – 28 March 1995) was a member of the United States Marine Corps who, in 1967, became the first female United States Marine to serve in a combat zone in Vietnam. She served at Military Assistance Command, Vietnam (MACV) Headquarters in Saigon. She died in 1995.
