= Marine Corps Yumi =

Japanese manga series

- Cover of manga volume 7

まりんこゆみ (Marinko Yumi)
- Genre: Comedy
- Manga
- Written by: Anastasia Moreno
- Illustrated by: Takeshi Nogami
- Published by: Seikaisha
- Magazine: Saizensen
- Original run: 2012 – 2017
- Volumes: 7 volumes, 193 chapters
- icon

Marine Corps Yumi (Japanese: まりんこゆみ, Hepburn: Marinko Yumi) is a manga about life in the United States Marine Corps, written by former Marine Anastasia Moreno and illustrated by Takeshi Nogami. It is published in Japan by Seikaisha, both in print and digitally through its webcomic platform Saizensen, in Japanese and English.

== Plot ==
Yumi Nagumo is a carefree Nipponian (in-universe version of Japan) high school girl who dreams of going to the United States of Amerigo (in-universe version of the United States of America) and becoming its president. She managed to arrive in the US during summer vacation. After befriending some elderly veterans, she becomes convinced that joining the United States Marine Corps is the best way to move her dream forward and enlisted. The story follows Yumi and her friends in the Marines, starting from their experiences in boot camp to their daily lives as Marines stationed in Okinawa.

== Background ==
Anastasia Moreno, nicknamed Ana, was a US Marine of Japanese and Filipino American descent. She served for the United States Forces Japan as part of the United States Marine Corps in Japan from 1999 to 2004. After finishing active duty, she went on to become a civilian translator for the federal government, as well as a manga translator for Seven Seas Entertainment, translating licensed titles such as Strawberry Panic!, Girls und Panzer, and Girl Friends.

She started writing Marine Corps Yumi in part because of the lack of female Marine representation in the media. She drew from her own experiences as a Marine, as well as her understanding of Japanese people and culture thanks to her Japanese ancestry from her mother's side. She collaborated with Takeshi Nogami, who is known for his work on Strike Witches and the aforementioned Girls und Panzer, among other titles.

After a long affliction with cancer, Moreno died on July 12, 2015. The series was continued by Nogami as he was given the whole plot by Moreno before her death and the English translation will be continued by Dan Kanemitsu.

On June 20, 2017, Takeshi announced that he had finished all the stories of Marine Corps Yumi for a total of seven volumes containing 193 chapters. As of December 2017, 77 chapters have been officially translated to English and are available at the archived official website.

== Characters ==
=== Yumi Nagumo ===
Yumi Nagumo (南雲弓, Nagumo Yumi) is an 18-year-old Nipponian high school graduate who dreams of becoming the President of the United States. Because of her small stature and protruding strands of hair (ahoge), the drill instructors at Barris Island (in-universe version of Marine Corps Recruit Depot Parris Island) gave her the nickname "Antenna Midget". Despite being Nipponian, she had no difficulty enlisting after the recruiter learned that she was born in Hawaii, which makes her a natural-born US citizen.

Her Military Occupational Specialty (MOS) is CBRN Defense (57xx). She also serves as a Nipponese interpreter and translator, which might qualify her for Japanese Linguist (2739). Both had been Moreno's occupations when she was on active duty.

She is the first among the main characters to be promoted to Corporal. Later, she enrolls in officer school with King, and by the end of the story is starting training as an aviator.

=== Linda Crawford ===
Former diner waitress who enlisted together with Yumi, both to look after Yumi and to improve her own standing in life. She adores her older brother who owns an auto repair shop. Her MOS is Motor Transport (35xx). She later gets married with a fellow Marine.

=== Rita Fernandez ===
A military brat who was born and raised in Okinawa and is the fourth generation of Marine in her family. Her father is a Marine Sergeant Major. Her MOS is Intelligence (02xx). At the end of the story, she has risen to the rank of Sergeant Major like her father.

=== Donna King ===
An MBA graduate who turned down a job offer from Boldman Suchs to forge her own path in life, despite her privileged background. Has a strong interest in yaoi fiction, and finds an abundance of inspiration in the male-dominated Marine environment. Her MOS is Administration (either 01xx or 30xx).

She later enrolled in officer school with Yumi.

=== Takemi Sawa ===
Takemi Sawa (澤猛美, Sawa Takemi) is an NCOIC in the Nippon Ground Self-Defense Force with the rank of Staff Sergeant (二等陸曹, nisō), who is a Liaison Officer to the III Marine Operational Force in which the main characters serve. She was initially assigned to mentor Yumi in formal Japanese to improve her skills as interpreter. They became friends through working on assignments together and Yumi indulging Sawa's interest in US military uniforms. Her commanding officer mentioned that she went to an elite high school, which implies a privileged upbringing and explains her proficiency in formal Japanese.

== Accuracy ==
Since it was written from first-hand experience, the depiction of the military in the manga is generally accurate. In the (now inactive) official website, the writers provided explanations of the liberties taken in the story. These include country names, modifications to Marine insignia (e.g. the Eagle, Globe, and Anchor), military terms such as Marine Air Ground Operating Force (Marine Air-Ground Task Force), and exaggerated physical contact during boot camp for comedic effect.

Based on Yumi's birth year of 1984, the timeline of the main story most likely starts in 2002 or 2003, while the manga was published in the 2010s; some aspects of the story are current at the time of publication rather than the supposed time period. For example, Yumi visualizes Barack Obama as the US president, even though he entered office in 2009. A female character is also portrayed as lesbian, even though the Don't Ask, Don't Tell policy was still in effect during the story's time frame, and was only effectively repealed in 2011.

== Reception ==
Erica Friedman of the yuri review blog, Okazu, praised the manga's depiction of women teaming up, getting stronger and overcoming great odds, particularly during boot camp and the final Crucible tasks. She also noted the racial diversity of the main cast, which is relatively rare in manga. Members of the Women Marines Association have also embraced the manga and described it as "nostalgic".

== See also ==
- United States Armed Forces
- United States Marine Corps
- United States Forces Japan
- Women in the United States Marines
