= Alexandra Kudasheva =

Russian sportswoman and soldier

Polkovnik Alexandra Kudasheva (c. 1873–1921?) was a Russian sportswoman and female soldier, notable both for her endurance riding feats, and for commanding of one of the first fully integrated combat units during World War I.

== Biography ==
Kudasheva was a daughter of a soldier in the Orenburg Cossack Host. One source says that she was born during the campaign against Khiva in 1873, orphaned at a young age, and grew up among soldiers; another mentions qualifications in both medicine and veterinary medicine, travels in India, and knowledge of several Asian languages, including fluent Kazakh. Sources do not record her maiden name, and it is even unclear whether her father's name was Gerasim or Georgiy.

She married a cavalry officer, a member of the princely family of Kudachev (a lineage of Tatar origin descended from Genghis Khan) who eventually held the rank equivalent to lieutenant-colonel (voiskovoi starshina) in the 6th Ural Cossack Regiment. When her husband died in the early years of the twentieth century, the widowed Mme. Kudasheva decided to ride solo across Eurasia to present herself to the Tsar and demonstrate the physical capabilities of the female Cossack - although she had to delay her expedition until her children had grown up and left home.

She eventually departed from Harbin in May 1910. Her only equipment consisted of her traditional Cossack saddle, uniform and weapons, and what she could carry in her saddlebags (total weight of 98.3 kg); her only companions were her Mongolian horse Mongolka (height 129 cm) (Монголка, "Mongol") and her St. Bernard, Farab (Фараб, apparently named for he abandoned city of Otrar). The dog proved unable to keep up the pace, and was left behind in Chita. Having been fêted by several Cossack regiments along the route, and attracting increasing media attention, she passed through Moscow in June 1911 and arrived in St Petersburg in August 1911. The length of her journey was said to have been 12,000 versts, or around 8,000 miles.

The expedition made her something of a celebrity. In 1913-14 she undertook a second ride from Vladivostok back to the capital, this time riding the Tsar's own Arabian horse, Kret (Крит, "Crete"), in order to test the comparative qualities of the two breeds. She published a diary of her treks, and also wrote poetry.

When World War I broke out in 1914, Mme. Kudasheva enlisted in her husband's old regiment as a volunteer. Some sources record that she had already fought alongside her husband in the Russo-Japanese War, but her bravery in East Prussia won her the Order of St. George and a lieutenant's commission. By 1915, she had risen to command the regiment, a force of 600 light cavalry, and her "boys and girls" included other female troopers and officers, notably Olga Kokovtseva, with whom she is sometimes confused; by 1917, they were said to comprise approximately half the regiment.

In 1917, she was traveling incognito through Central Asia, perhaps on espionage duty. She may have been the Alexandra Gerasimova Kudachev who was executed by the Cheka in 1921 in what is now Kazakhstan.

== Sources ==
- Excerpts from newspaper reports and memoirs concerning Alexandra Kudasheva (in Russian).
- Biographical entry in the Great Soviet Encyclopedia (in Russian).
- Biography with photograph (in Russian).
- Another biography with additional information (in Russian).
- English-language newspaper report from 1915 on Colonel Kudasheva's First World War career.
- Memoir of her First World War service, based on her own letters and writings.
- 1917 news report mentioning her regiment.
