= Women in the military =

Women participating in military activities

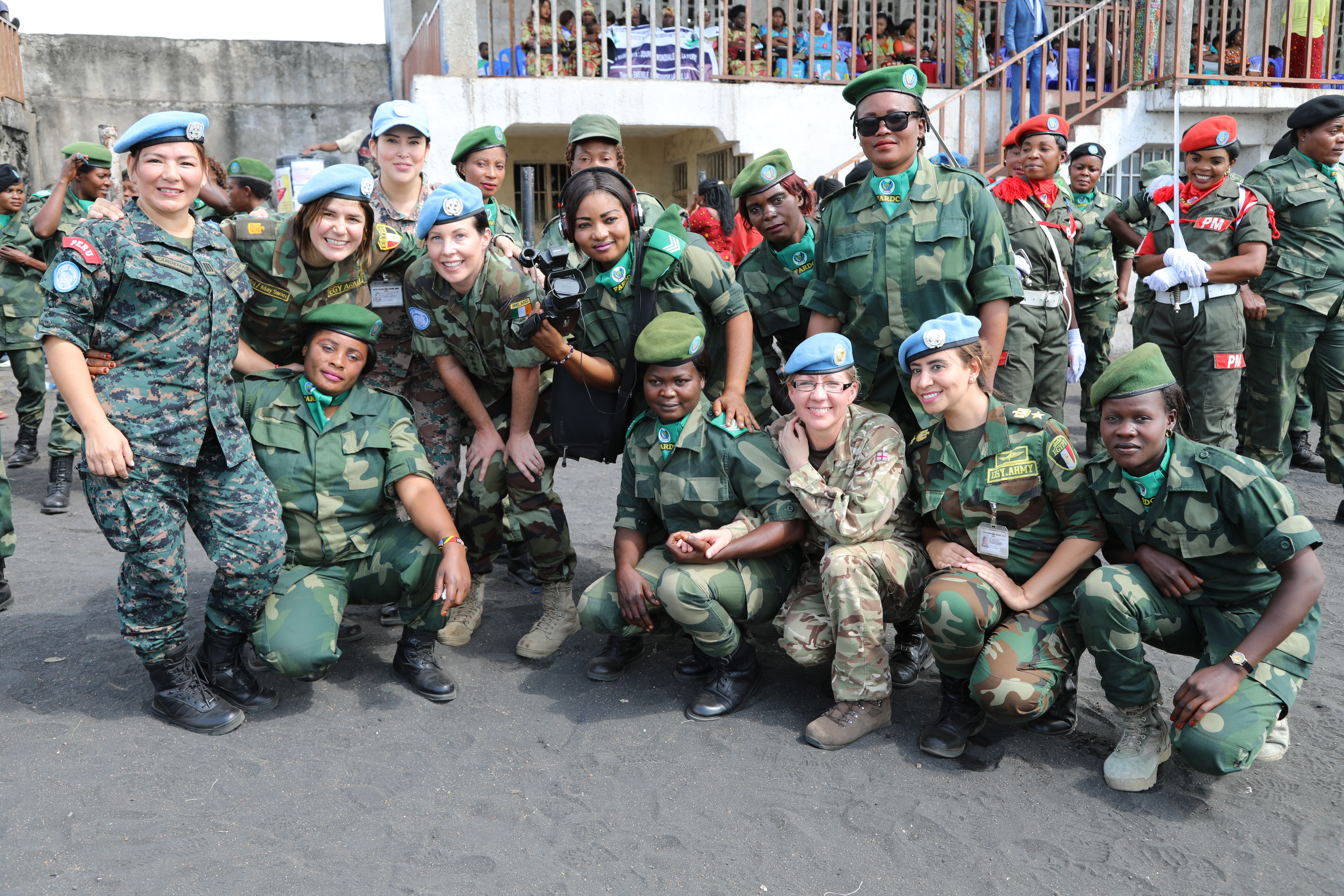
Female personnel of the FARDC and MONUSCO in the Democratic Republic of the Congo.

Possibility or obligation of women to serve in their countries' military. (2024) Service voluntary for both men and women Conscription for both men and women Selective conscription for both men and women Conscription for men, women may volunteer Selective conscription for men, women may volunteer No data, no military, or no women allowed.

Women have been serving in the military since the inception of organized warfare, in both combat and non-combat roles, including leading armies. Their inclusion in combat missions has increased in recent decades, often serving as pilots, mechanics, and infantry officers. Women's service in the military is often optional, while men are more likely to be subject to conscription.

Since 1914, women have been conscripted in greater numbers, filling a greater variety of roles in Western militaries. In the 1970s, most Western armies began allowing women to serve on active duty in all military branches.

As of 2025, twelve countries (China, Denmark, Eritrea, Israel, Libya, Malaysia, the Netherlands, North Korea, Norway, Peru, Sweden, and Taiwan) conscript women into military service. Of these countries, only four conscript women and men on the same formal conditions: Denmark, the Netherlands, Norway, and Sweden. A few other countries have laws allowing for the conscription of women into their armed forces, though with some differences such as service exemptions, length of service, and more.

== History by war ==
=== World War I ===
==== Russia ====
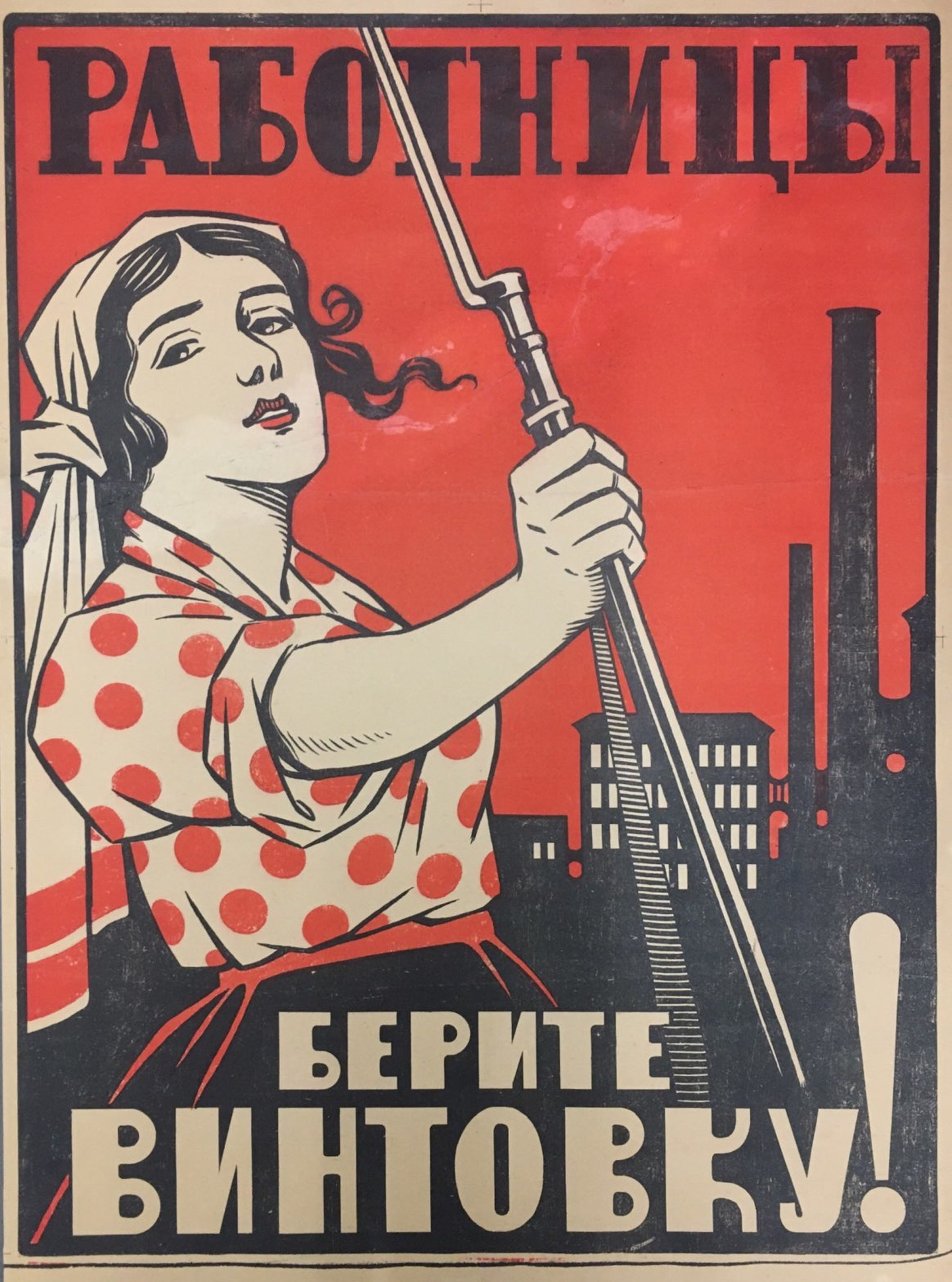
Russian poster from Russian Civil War years

Russia is the only nation to deploy female combat troops in substantial numbers, up until the end of the Cold War. Historically, female recruits either joined the military in disguise or were tacitly accepted by their units. Perhaps the most prominent was a contingent of front-line light cavalry in a Cossack regiment commanded from 1915 to 1917 by a female colonel, Alexandra Kudasheva (1873–1921?). This cavalry regiment fought in WWI and also during the Russian Revolution and may have been the first gender-integrated regiment in Russian history. She was also noted for her endurance riding feats.

Others included Maria Bochkareva, who was decorated three times and promoted to senior NCO rank, while The New York Times reported that a group of twelve schoolgirls from Moscow had enlisted together disguised as young men. In 1917, the Provisional Government raised a number of "Women's Battalions", with Maria Bochkareva given an officer's commission in command. They were disbanded before the end of the year. In the later Russian Civil War, they fought both for the Bolsheviks (infantry) and the White Guard. Natalie Tychmini was a Russian woman who disguised herself as a man in order to fight. She received the Cross of St. George for fighting the Austrians in Opatów in 1915. Her sex was discovered when she was wounded, and she was sent back to Kiev.

==== Others ====
In Serbia, some women played key military roles. Scottish doctor Elsie Ingles coordinated a retreat of approximately 8,000 Serbian troops through Romania and revolutionary Russia, up to Scandinavia, and finally onto transport ships back to England. Milunka Savić enlisted in the Serbian army in place of her brother. She fought throughout the war, becoming one of the most decorated women in military history.

In 1917, Loretta Walsh became the first woman in the United States to enlist openly as a woman. In the 1918 Finnish Civil War, more than 2,000 women fought in the Women's Red Guards.

=== Spanish Civil War ===
During the Spanish Civil War, thousands of women fought in mixed-gender combat and rearguard units, or as part of militias.

=== Second Sino-Japanese War ===
Several women's battalions were established in China during the Second Sino-Japanese War. These included the Guangxi Women's Battalion, the Yunnan Women's Battlefield Service Unit, Zhejiang Women's Guerrilla Band, Hunan War Service Corps, and others.

=== World War II ===
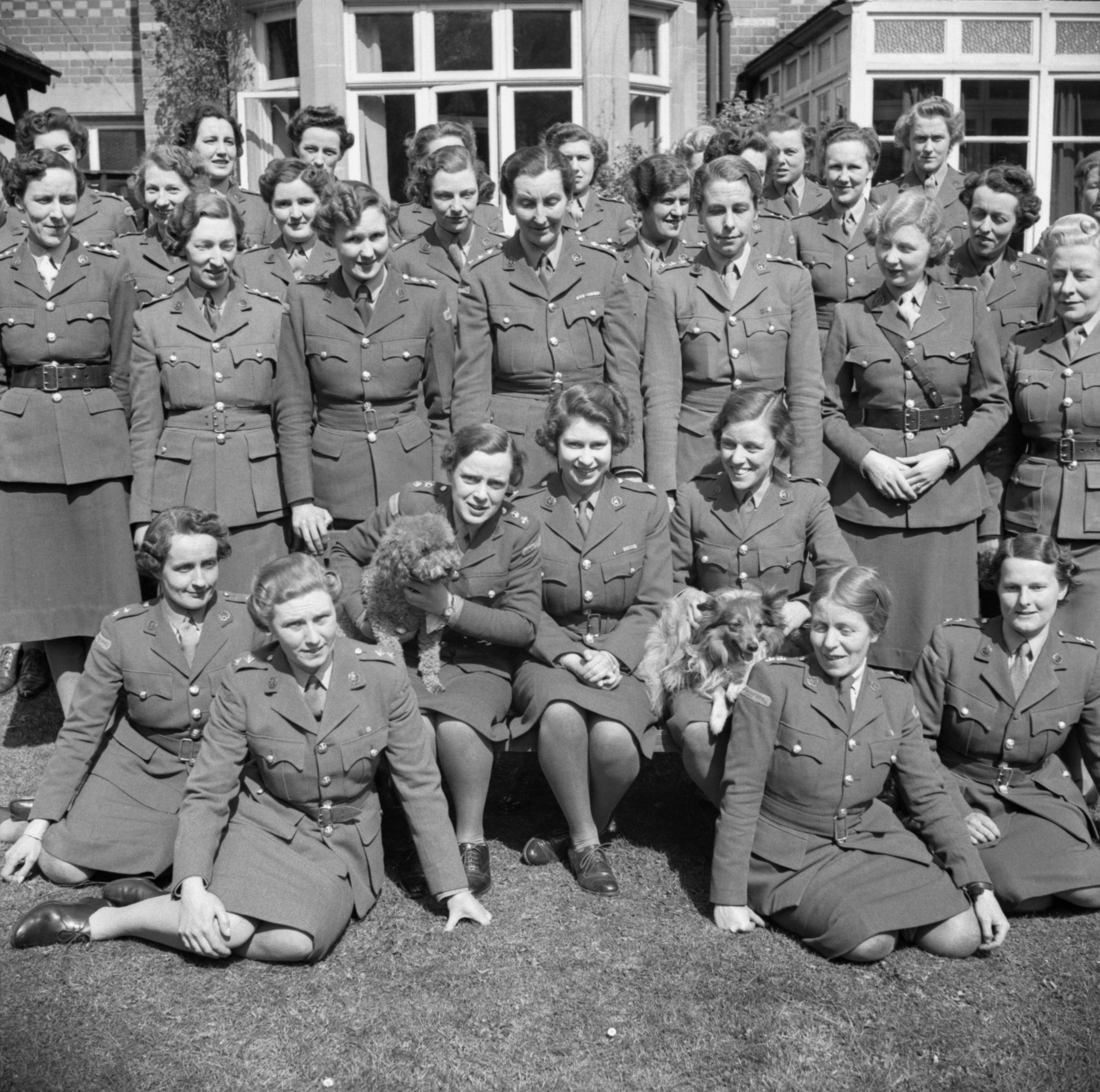
Then-Princess Elizabeth (centre) served in the British Army, during the 1940s.

All the major participating nations in World War II enlisted women. The majority served in nursing and clerical or support roles. More than 500,000 women had combat roles in anti-aircraft units in Britain and Germany, as well as front-line units in the Soviet Union.

==== Soviet Union ====
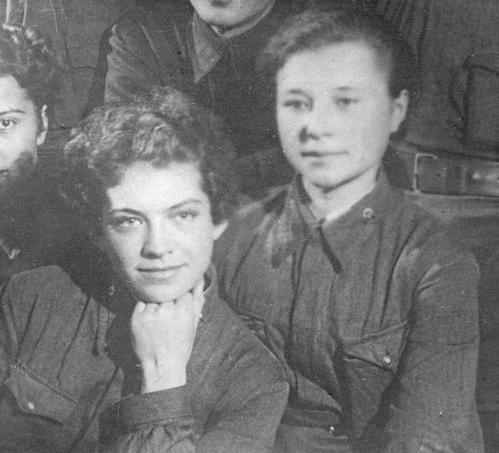
Snipers Natalya Kovshova and Mariya Polivanova became posthumous Heroines of the Soviet Union after committing suicide in battle to avoid capture by German forces.

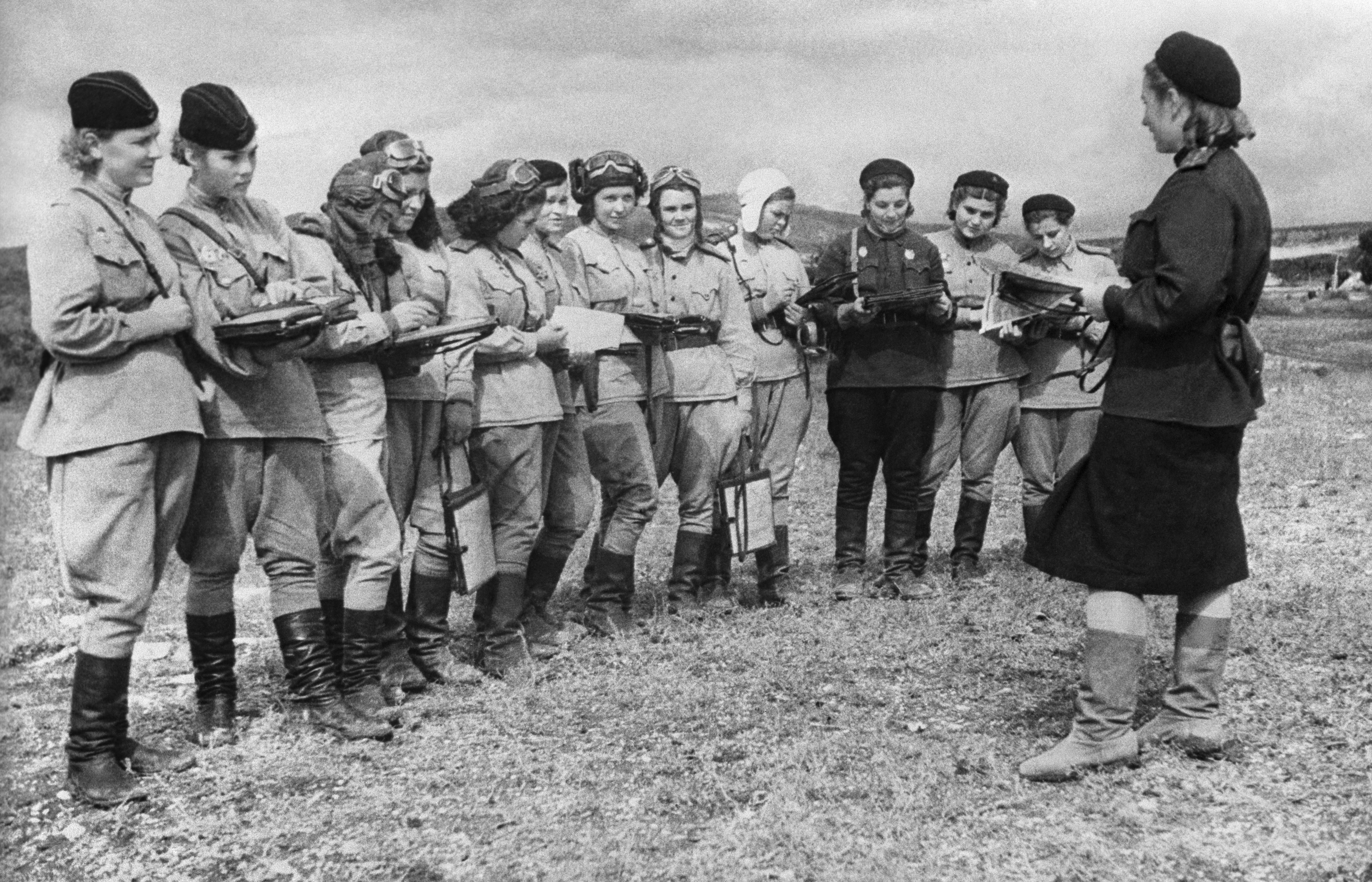
Soviet aviators of the all-female 46th Guards Night Bomber Regiment ("Night Witches"), 1943

In most countries during the Second World War women tended to serve mostly in administrative, medical and in auxiliary roles. But in the Soviet Union women fought also in front line roles. More than 800,000 women served in the Soviet armed forces in World War II, mostly as medics and nurses, which is more than 3 percent of total personnel; nearly 200,000 of them were decorated. 89 of them eventually received the Soviet Union's highest award, the Hero of the Soviet Union, they served as pilots, snipers, machine gunners, tank crew members and partisans, as well as in auxiliary roles. Few of these women, however, were promoted to officers.

==== United States ====
During World War II, more than 350,000 women served in the United States Armed Forces as members of the Army's Women's Auxiliary Army Corps (later renamed the Women's Army Corps), the Army Nurse Corps, the Navy's WAVES (Women Accepted for Volunteer Emergency Service) and the Marine Corps' Women's Reserve. Of these, 432 were killed and 88 were taken prisoner.

During the war, many Japanese-American women lost their jobs because they were sent to relocation camps. Despite this, many of them volunteered to serve in the Women's Auxiliary Army Corps. These women were subject to racism as well as sexism when they joined WAAC; despite this, they made significant contributions to the war effort. Many women were hired as interpreters, translators, and interrogators in the Military Intelligence Service.

==== India ====
In 1942, the Indian National Army (Azaad Hind Fauj) established Rani of Jhansi Regiment, India's first all-women regiment to fight for Indian independence under the leadership of Subash Chandra Bose, with Japanese assistance. It is estimated that more than 1,000 women served in the regiment.

==== United Kingdom ====
In 1938, the British established uniformed services for women (small units of nurses had long been in service). In late 1941, Britain began conscripting women, sending most into factories and some into the military, especially the Auxiliary Territorial Service (ATS) attached to the army. The ATS began as a women's auxiliary in 1938. In 1941, the ATS was granted military status, although women received only two-thirds of male pay. Women had a well-publicized role in handling anti-aircraft guns against German planes and V-1 missiles. Prime Minister Winston Churchill's daughter was there, and he said that any general who saved him 40,000 fighting men had gained the equivalent of a victory. By August 1941, women were operating fire-control instruments; although they were never allowed to pull the trigger, since killing the enemy was considered too masculine. By 1943, 56,000 women were in Anti-Aircraft Command, mostly in units close to London where they faced a risk of death, but not of capture. The first death of a woman in Anti-Aircraft Command occurred in April 1942.

==== Germany ====
Nazi Germany had similar roles for women. The SS-Helferinnen were regarded as part of the SS if they had undergone training at a Reichsschule SS. All other female workers were contracted to the SS and chosen largely from concentration camps. Women served in auxiliary units in the navy (Kriegshelferinnen), air force (Luftnachrichtenhelferinnen) and army (Nachrichtenhelferin).

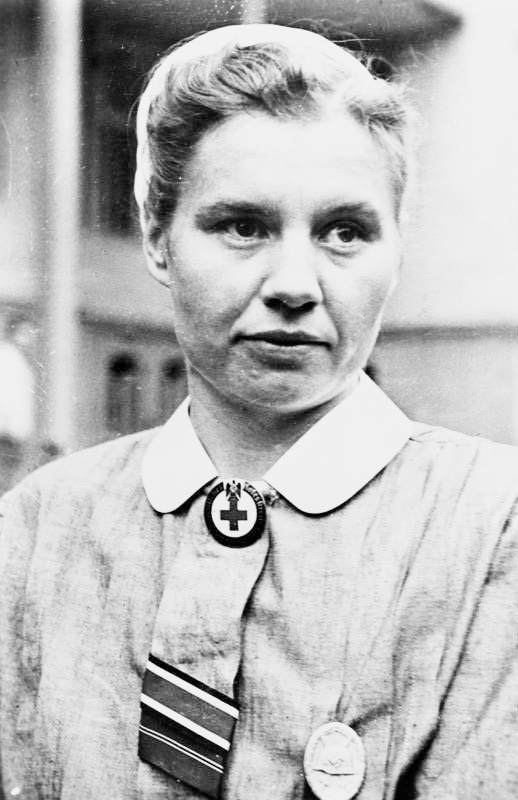
Second woman to win the Iron Cross, nurse Elfriede Wnuk

In 1944–45 roughly 500,000 women were volunteer uniformed auxiliaries in the German armed forces (Wehrmacht). Approximately the same number served in civil aerial defense. 400,000 volunteered as nurses and many more replaced drafted men in the wartime economy. In the Luftwaffe, women served in combat roles helping to operate anti-aircraft systems to shoot down Allied bombers. By 1945, German women held 85% of the billets as clerics, accountants, interpreters, laboratory workers and administrative workers, together with half of the clerical and junior administrative posts in high-level field headquarters.

The German nursing service consisted of four main organizations: one for Catholics, one for Protestants, the secular DRK (Red Cross), and the "Brown Nurses" for committed Nazi women. Military nursing was primarily handled by the DRK, which came under partial Nazi control. Front line medical services were provided by male medics and doctors. Red Cross nurses served widely within the military medical services, staffing the hospitals close to the front lines and at risk of attack. Two dozen nurses were awarded the Iron Cross for heroism under fire. Brown Nurses were forced to look away while their incapacitated patients were murdered by war criminals.

Hundreds of women auxiliaries (Aufseherinnen) served in the SS in the camps, the majority of which were at Ravensbrück. Members of the SS-Gefolge were civilians who served the SS but were not formally a part of the SS.

On the home front, women were increasingly mobilized for war production as the war turned against the Nazis. Nazi ideology had sought to exclude women from public life outside of "Kinder, Küche, Kirche" (Children, Kitchen, Church), but labour shortages made this untenable, in spite of the widespread use of slave labour. Nazi policies encouraged reproduction by women belonging to the putative "Aryan race", with the goal of producing future workers and soldiers for the Volksgemeinschaft.

Women also fought in the Volkssturm near the end of World War Two. Girls as young as 14 years were trained in the use of small arms, panzerfaust, machine guns, and hand grenades from December 1944 through May 1945.

==== Italy ====
In Italy, during the second world war, the Female Auxiliary Service (Italian: Servizio Ausiliario Femminile, SAF) was a women's corps of the armed forces of the Italian Social Republic, whose components, all voluntary, were commonly referred to as auxiliaries. The commander was the Brig. Gen. Piera Gatteschi Fondelli.

==== Yugoslav Partisans ====
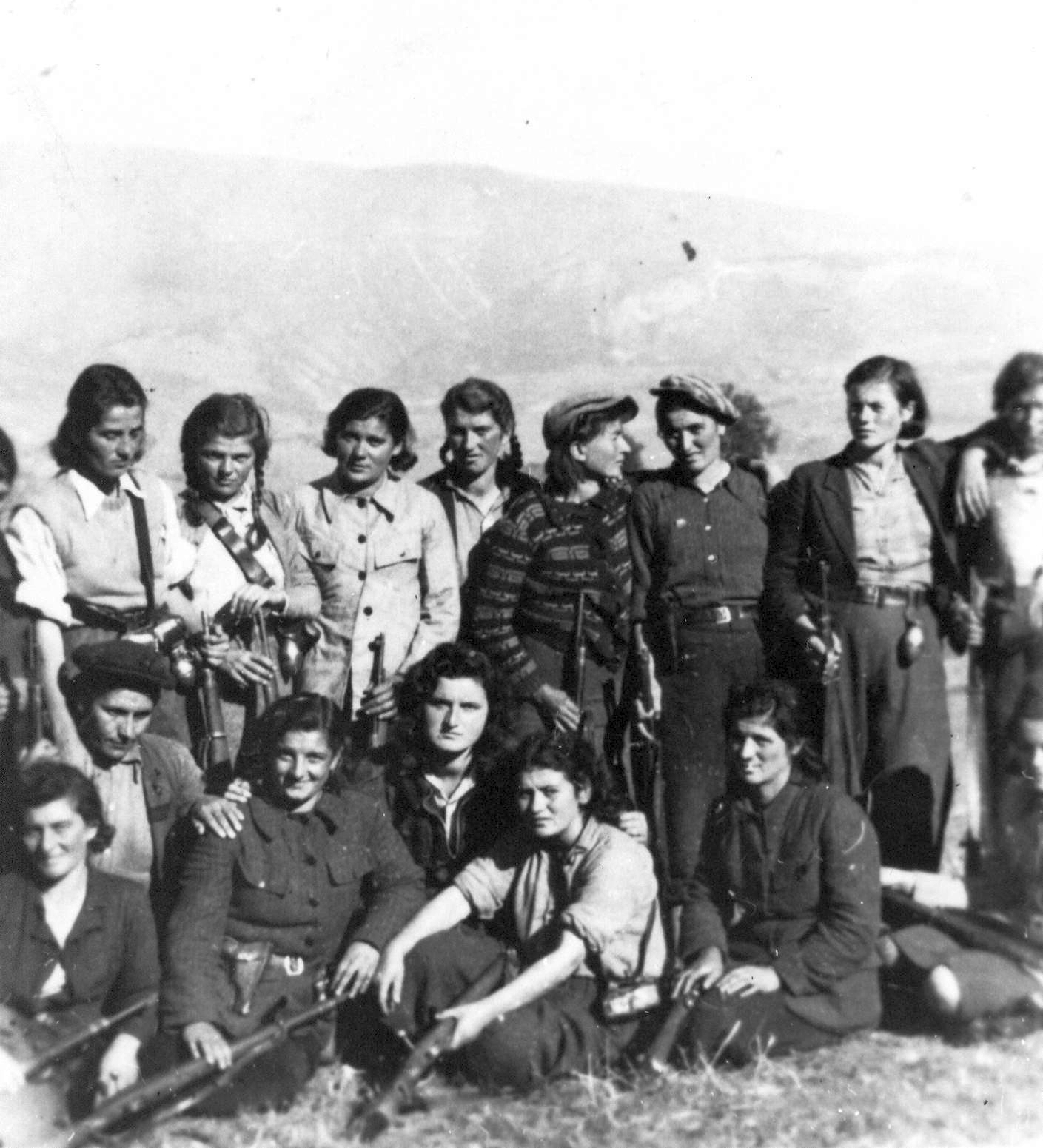
Partisan women in occupied Yugoslavia, July 1942

The Yugoslav National Liberation Movement had 6,000,000 civilian supporters; its two million women formed the Antifascist Front of Women (AFŽ), in which the revolutionary coexisted with the traditional. The AFŽ managed schools, hospitals and local governments. About 100,000 women served with 600,000 men in Tito's Yugoslav National Liberation Army. It stressed its dedication to women's rights and gender equality and used the imagery of folklore heroines to attract and legitimize the fighters. After the war, although women were relegated to traditional gender roles, Yugoslavia's historians emphasized women's roles in the resistance. After Yugoslavia broke up in the 1990s, women's contributions to the resistance were forgotten.

==== Jewish Parachutists of Mandate Palestine ====
The Jewish Parachutists of Mandate Palestine were a group of 250 Jewish men and women from the Yishuv communities in Mandatory Palestine. The group members would go to missions run by British organisations MI9 and the Special Operations Executive (SOE) involving parachuting into German-occupied Europe. The group had both women and men, and one of the most known members were Chana Senesh and Haviva Reik whom were subsequently executed.

A Congolese female para-commando during jump training at capital Leopoldville in 1967

== History by country ==
=== Democratic Republic of the Congo ===
The Democratic Republic of the Congo began training an initial 150 women as para-commandos for the Armée Nationale Congolaise in 1967. Many more were trained subsequently, over a period of years. The women received parachute and weapons training, although it is unclear to what extent they were actually integrated into the combat units of the Congo.

Currently, women are among the soldiers that make up the Wazalendo, a network of armed militias aligned with the DRC government opposed to rebel insurgents.

=== Eritrea ===
In 1999, the BBC reported that about a quarter of the Eritrean soldiers in the Eritrean–Ethiopian War were women.

Since 2003, both boys and girls are conscripted to serve a minimum of 12 months in the military. Technically, the minimum age is 18, but in practice, many are younger and some conscripts have been forced to serve for decades. As of 2015, rape and sexual assault of female conscripts was considered "pervasive," with up to 90% reporting suffering sexual abuse.

=== Israel ===
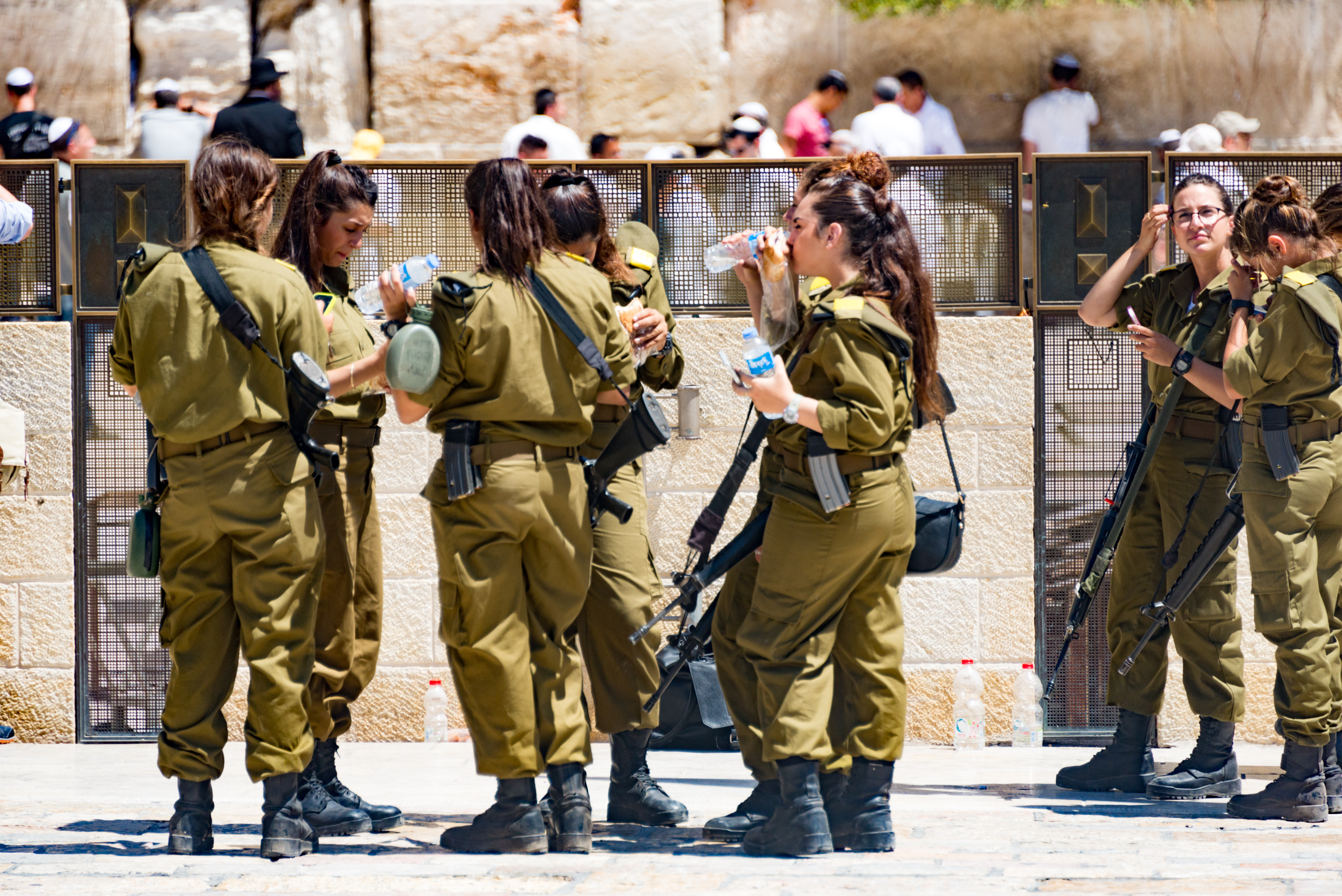
Female Israeli soldiers in Jerusalem, 2014

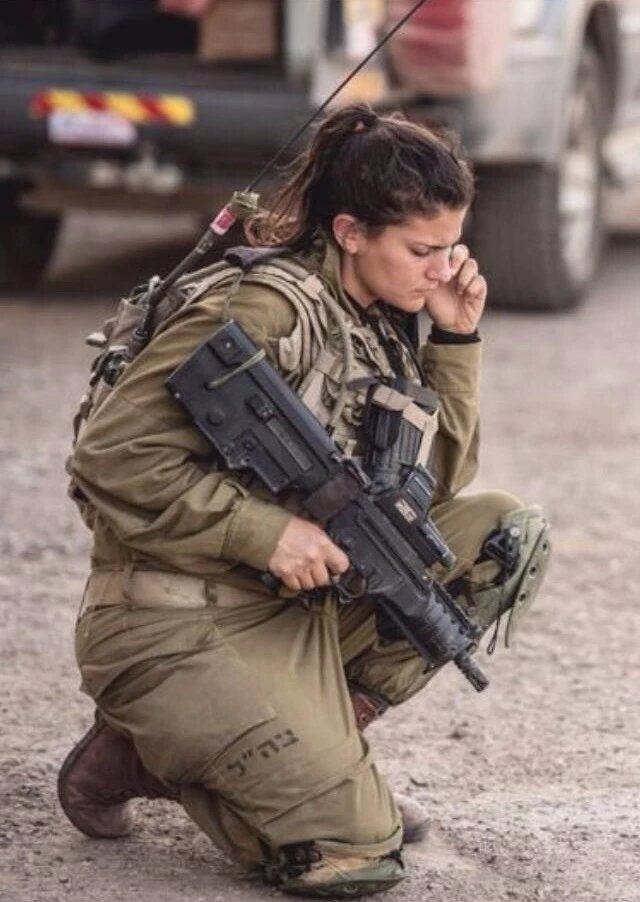
Or Ben Yehuda, commander of Caracal Battalion

Mandatory conscription for single and married women without children began in 1948. Initially, women conscripts served in the Women's Army Corps, serving as clerks, drivers, welfare workers, nurses, radio operators, flight controllers, ordnance personnel, and instructors. Roles for women beyond technical and secretarial support began opening up in the late 1970s and early 1980s.

In 2000, the Equality amendment to the Military Service law granted equal opportunities in the military to women found physically and personally suitable for a job. Women started to enter combat support and light combat roles in a few areas, including the Artillery Corps, infantry units and armored divisions. A few platoons named Carakal were formed for men and women to serve together in light infantry. Many women joined the Border Police.

Despite these changes, as of 2014, fewer than 4 percent of women service members were in combat positions such as infantry, crew of tanks or other armored vehicles, artillery guns service, fighter pilots, etc. Rather, they are concentrated in "combat-support".

In 2023, the mostly-female Caracal battalion was involved in intense fighting in the October 7 attacks. The female soldiers battled militants for nearly four hours as part of the broader effort to repel the incursion. By some accounts, they played a decisive part in the clashes, with estimates that the unit killed around 100 Hamas members. None of the female combat soldiers were killed during the engagement, which has been characterized as a validation of their abilities. The unit's performance in real-world combat against Hamas is also seen as proof that women can execute infantry missions effectively when given the requisite training.

=== United States ===
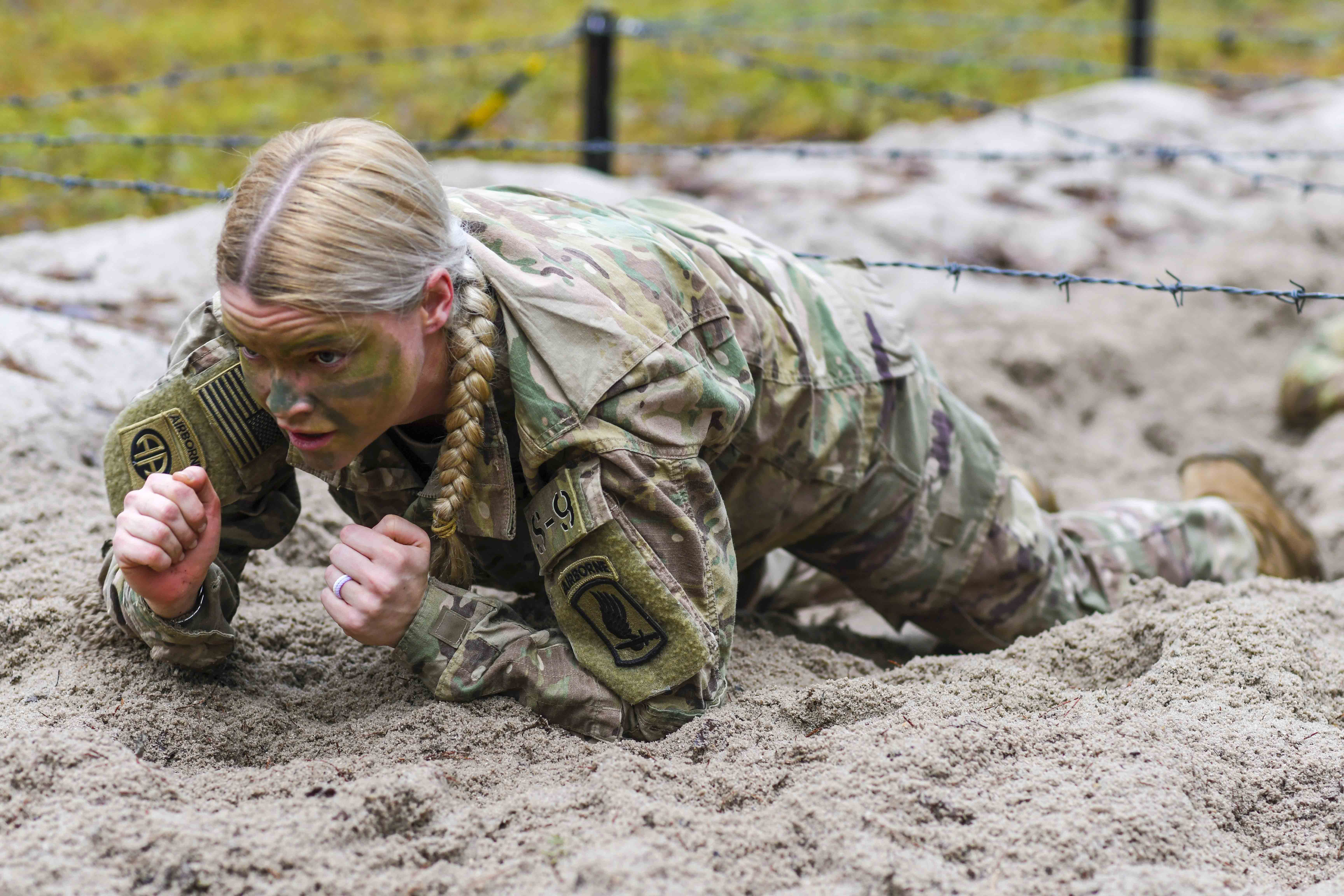
US Army officer completes barbed wire training in 2021

Women have been involved in the U.S. military since 1775, originally in the civilian fields of nursing, laundering, mending clothing and cooking.

Deborah Sampson was one of the first women to serve in the American military. She was unhappy with her limited role in the American Revolution, and she enlisted in the Continental Army disguised as a man under the name Robert Shirtliff. She served in a light infantry unit, fighting in many battles. After 17 months of service, including suffering a serious leg injury, she fell ill and unconscious. Her secret was discovered in the hospital by the doctor. Soon after, Sampson revealed her secret, through a letter written by the doctor, to her commanding officer, General John Paterson. He discharged her, thanked her for her service, and sent her home.

==== Civil War ====
Many women contributed to the American Civil War, through nursing, spying, and fighting on the battlefield. For example, Belle Boyd began her career as a spy and messenger at age 17. By age 20, she became famous in the United States and was dubbed the Cleopatra of the Confederacy. As a spy, she provided confederate leaders with valuable information. She was arrested multiple times and imprisoned. Eventually, she was banished from federal soil and was told she would receive a death sentence if she were caught on federal soil again.

Those who fought in the war disguised themselves as men and went by male aliases. These women were better able to conceal their true identities because soldiers showered separately and were fully clothed the majority of the time.Sophronia Smith Hunt disguised herself as a man and served in the Union Army at the Battle of Jenkins' Ferry. She fought alongside her husband, who was wounded in the battle and later died.

Most commonly, women's identities were revealed if they were injured. Other disguised women were uncovered by chance. Sarah Collins enlisted alongside her brother; she cut her hair short and dressed in men's apparel. Her identity was discovered because of the manner in which she put on her shoes. Sarah was then sent home while her brother went to war.

It is difficult for historians to estimate the true number of women who fought in the war because of their disguises and aliases, as well as their desire for discretion. Women joined the fray of the Civil War for similar reasons as men: the promise of a steady wage, innate sense of patriotism, or the thrill of an adventure. Some women also followed their loved ones into battle.

==== 20th century ====
In 1917, Loretta Walsh became the first woman to enlist openly as a woman when she joined the Navy.

In 1948, prior the Korean War, the United States passed the Women's Armed Services Integration Act which allowed women to serve in the permanent, regular members of the U.S. military. The law limited the percentage of enlisted women to 2% of the enlisted number, the number of officers to 10% of the number of enlisted women, and capped the rank a woman could achieve at O-5 (lieutenant colonel/commander), with an exception of O-6 for the chief of a women's component.

In November 1967, Public Law 90-130 was enacted, which removed the 2% ceiling on the number of women allowed on active duty, and lifted the rank ceiling, opening promotions to general and flag ranks for women.

In 1976, the first group of women (Class of 1980) — 119 in all — was admitted into a U.S. military academy.

===== Vietnam War =====
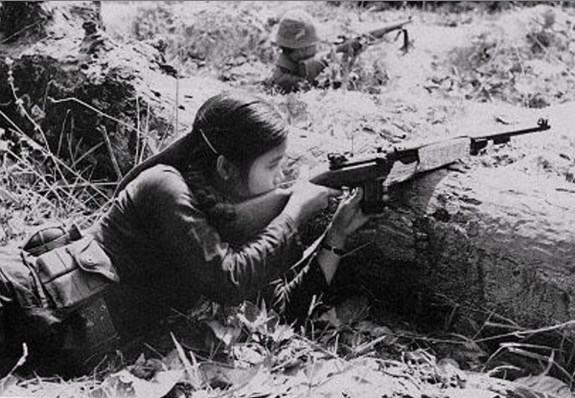
A Viet Cong guerilla

Though relatively little official data exists about female Vietnam War veterans, the Vietnam Women's Memorial Foundation estimates that approximately 11,000 military women were stationed in Vietnam during the conflict. Nearly all of them were volunteers, and 90 percent served as military nurses, though women also worked as physicians, air traffic controllers, intelligence officers, clerks and other positions in the U.S. Women's Army Corps, U.S. Navy, Air Force and Marines and the Army Medical Specialist Corps. In addition to women in the armed forces, an unknown number of civilian women served in Vietnam on behalf of the Red Cross, United Service Organizations (USO), Catholic Relief Services and other humanitarian organizations, or as foreign correspondents for various news organizations.

In addition to the U.S. military women who served in Vietnam, the exact number of female civilians who willingly gave their services on Vietnamese soil during the conflict is unknown; an estimate by American scholar Marilyn B. Young said that altogether, between 33,000 and 55,000 women worked in Vietnam during the war. Many of them worked on behalf of the American Red Cross, Army Special Services, United Service Organizations (USO), Peace Corps, and various religious groups such as Catholic Relief Services.

Aside from the perspective of the United States, more than a million Vietnamese women served in varying military positions in North Vietnam; women were often engaged in combat directly with southern forces.

==== Gulf War ====
In 1990 and 1991, some 40,000 American military women were deployed during the Gulf War operations Desert Shield and Desert Storm; however, no women served in combat. A policy enacted in 1994 prohibited women from assignment to ground combat units below the brigade level. Two women were taken prisoner by Iraqi forces and both of them were threatened and abused.

===== 21st century =====
By 2013, approximately 16% of the graduating class at West Point consisted of women. As of 2026, more than 6,800 women have graduated from West Point.

=== Russia ===
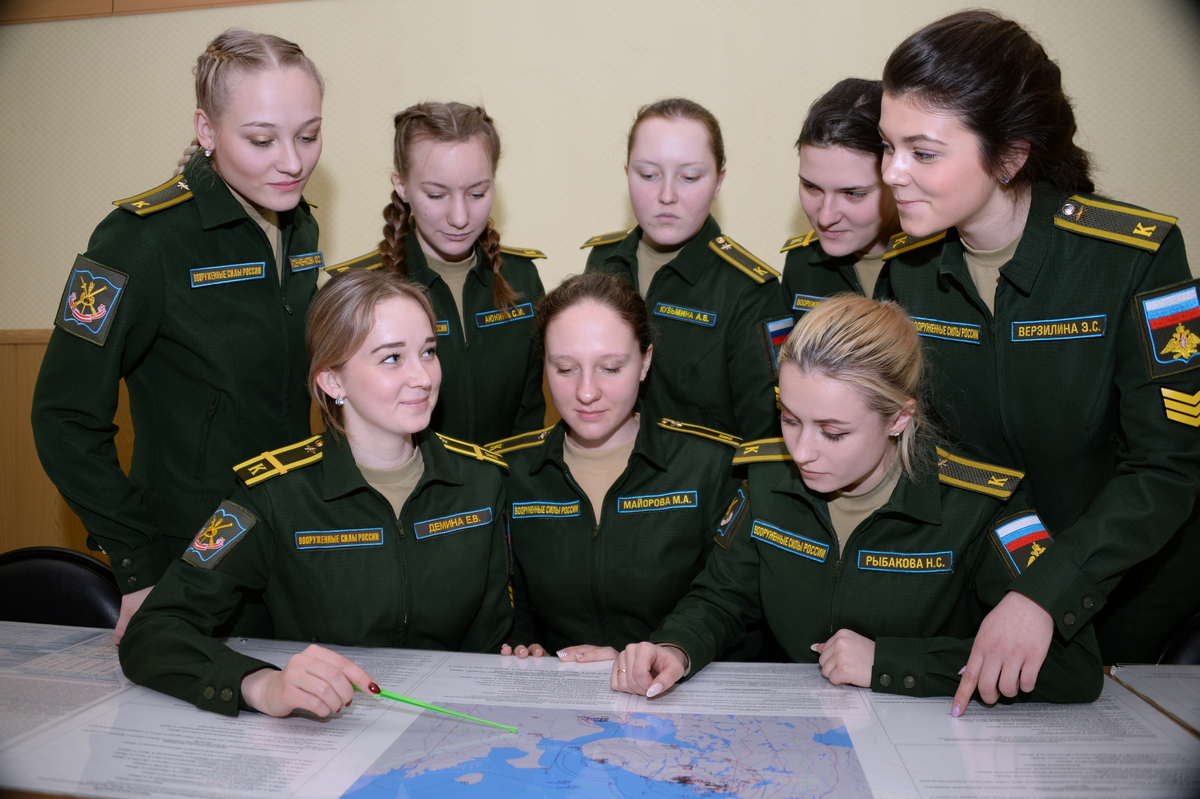
Training of cadets in Russia's Air and Space Defense Academy, 2019

Women have played many roles in the Russian and Soviet military history. Women played an important role in world wars in Russia and the Soviet Union, particularly during World War II.

As of March 2024, according to Russian Defence Minister, 37,500 women served in the Russian armed forces, while 275,000 were civilian personnel.

During the Russo-Ukrainian war, Russian women served in a frontline assault units.

== Contemporary ==
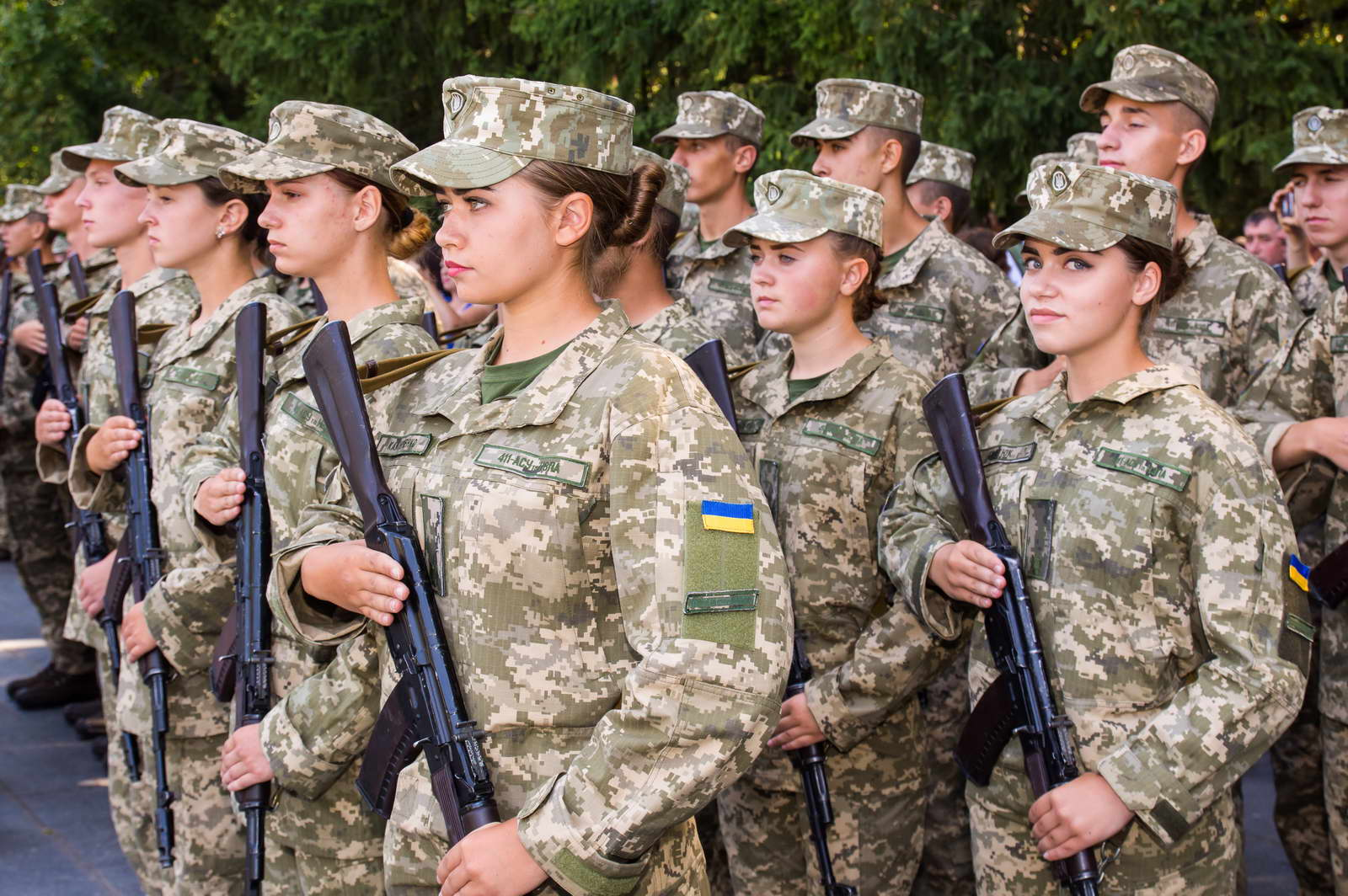
First-year students of the Kharkiv National Air Force University, Ukraine, 2018

In 2006, eight countries (China, Eritrea, Israel, Libya, Malaysia, North Korea, Peru, and Taiwan) conscripted women into military service. In 2013, Norway became the first NATO country to draft women, as well as the first country in the world to conscript women on the same formal terms as men. Sweden followed in 2017, as did the Netherlands in 2018 (although in the Netherlands there is no active peacetime conscription) and Denmark in 2025.

The approximate proportion of female military personnel varies by country as shown in below table.

Country	Female military personnel	Year
Argentina	20%	2023
Australia	20%	2024
Austria	4%	2023
Belgium	9%	2023
Brazil	10%	2024
Bulgaria	17%	2023
Canada	16.6%	2024
Chile	18%	2021
Denmark	17%	2023
Germany	13%	2023
Greece	16.8%	2023
France	15%	2015
India	1%	2023
Indonesia	7%	2023
Iran	0%	2023
Iraq	2%	2022
Ireland	7%	2023
Israel	20%	2025
Italy	7%	2023
Mexico	12%	2023
Netherlands	14%	2023
New Zealand	20%	2024
Norway	20%	2023
Poland	16.5%	2024
Portugal	15%	2023
Slovakia	13.59%	2023
South Africa	30%	2023
South Korea	6.8%	2020
Spain	12%	2023
Sweden	22%	2023
Switzerland	1%	2023
Taiwan	15%	2023
Thailand	8%	2021
United Kingdom	11.9%	2025
United States	17.7%	2023

=== Ukraine ===
In September 2022, Aljazeera stated: "There are about 50,000 women serving in the Ukrainian armed forces in combat and non-combat roles, of which about 10,000 are currently either on the front lines of the war or in jobs that could send them to the front lines, according to Ukrainian military officials. There were about 32,000 women in the military prior to the invasion."

=== United States ===
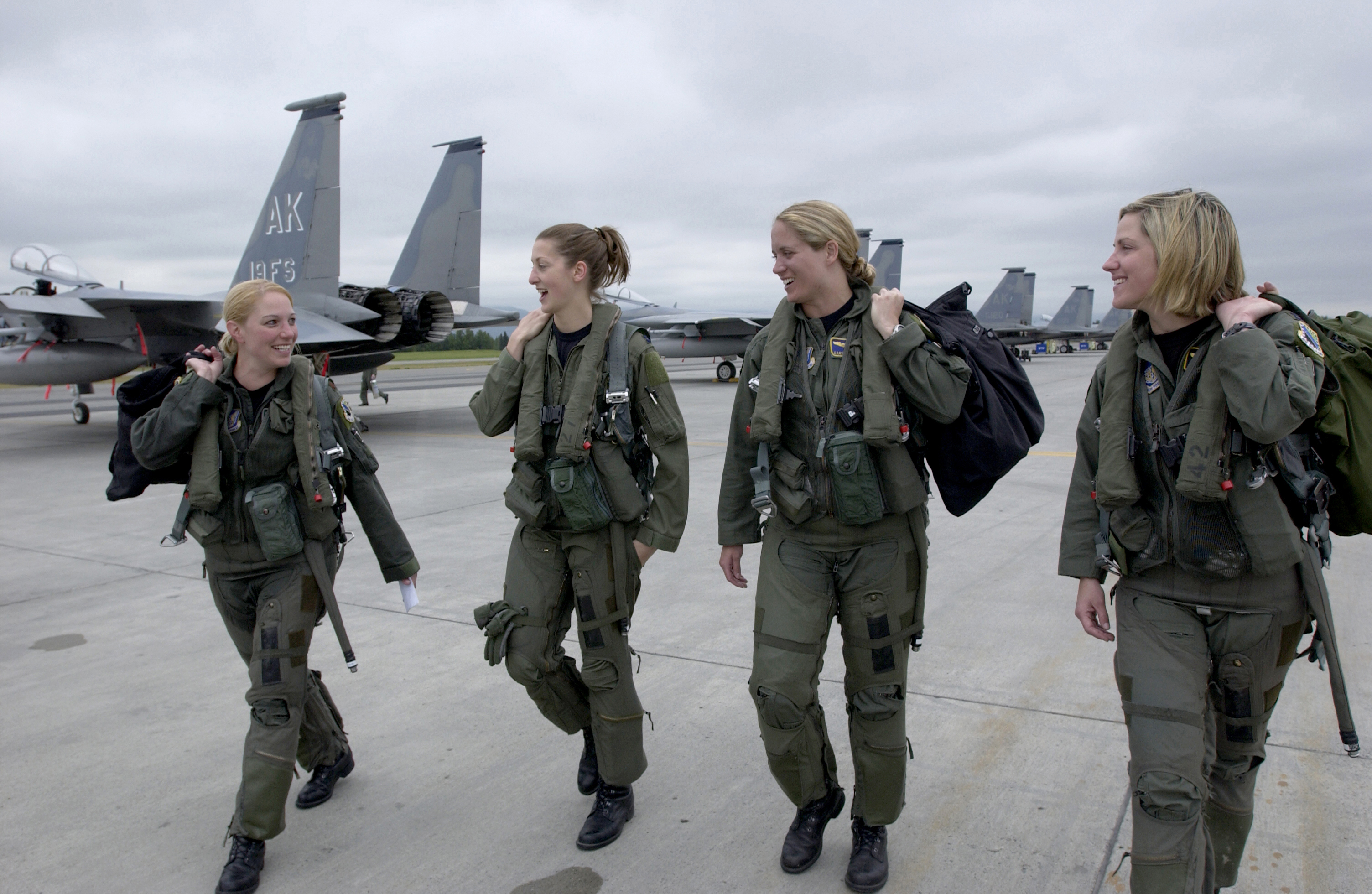
Female U.S. Air Force pilots from the 3rd Wing walk to their F-15 Eagles at Joint Base Elmendorf-Richardson.

The United States military opens all positions to women. Units such as Special Operations require members to meet extraordinary requirements, and very few women have met them. As of 2024, it is reported that three women have completed the Army's elite Special Forces course, two have completed Navy Special Warfare Training to become a Naval Special Warfare combatant-craft crewman, one has completed the Air Force special tactics courses necessary to become a Combat Controller, three have completed the Air Force training necessary to become a Tactical Air Control Party airman, and one has completed the Air Force's elite Special Reconnaissance course.

Women have not historically been required to register for Selective Services; however, federal judge Gray Miller of the United States District Court for the Southern District of Texas, ruled on 2 February 2019 that an all-male draft is unconstitutional. The issue was brought when Marc Angelucci sued the Selective Service on behalf of the National Coalition for Men. Subsequently, the Fifth Circuit overturned Miller's ruling, sending the case to the Supreme Court who would refuse to hear it. June 2021, Supreme Court Justices Sotomayor, Breyer, and Kavanaugh authored an opinion stating the draft to be likely unconstitutional, and under review since 2016, by Congress and the National Commission on Military, National, and Public Service.

==== Policy changes ====
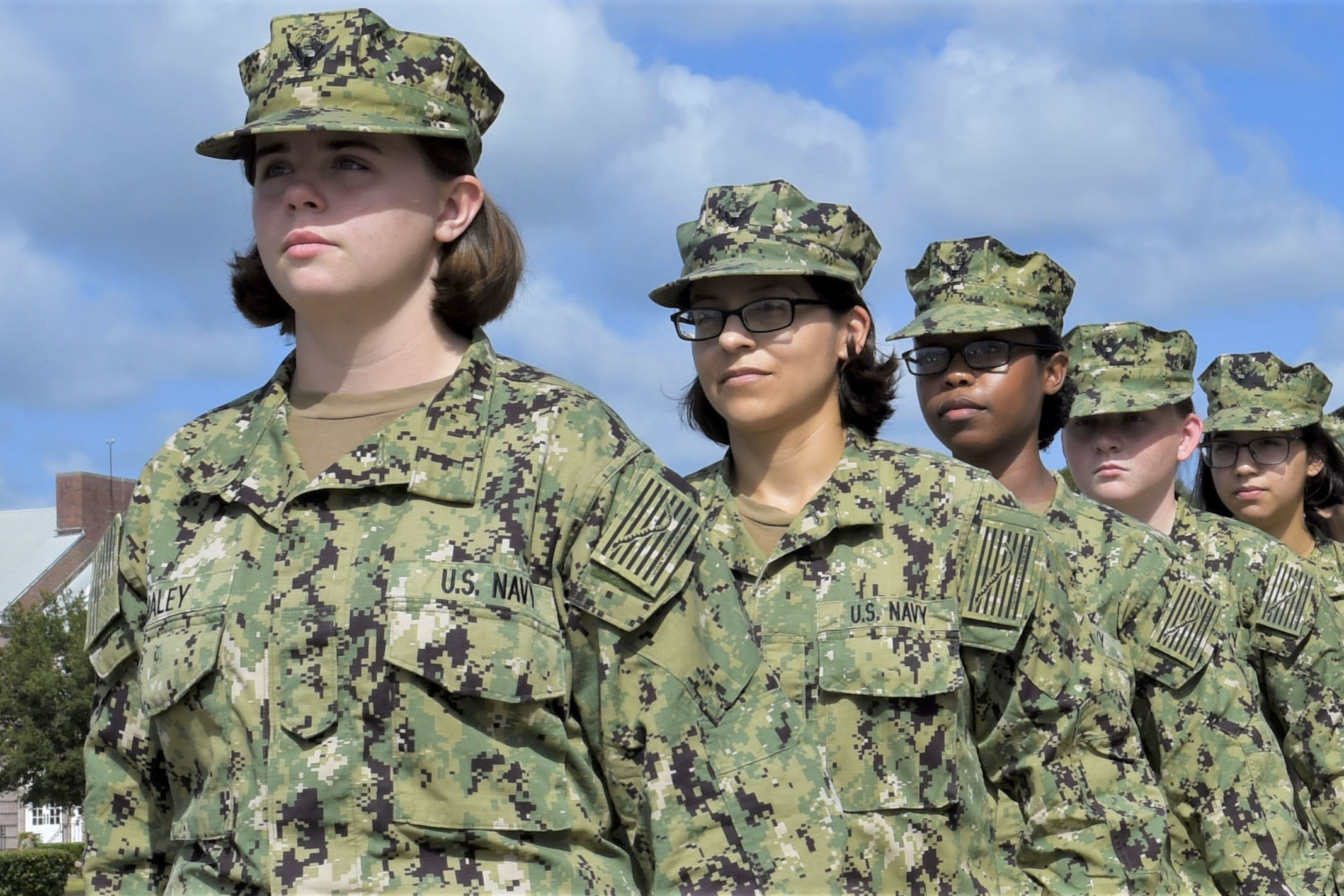
Sailors in formation at the Center for Information Warfare Training, Naval Air Station Pensacola Corry Station, 2019

Until 1993, 67 percent of the positions in the Army were open to women.

In 2013, 15.6 percent of the Army's 1.1 million soldiers, including National Guard And Reserve, were female, serving in 95 percent of occupations. As of 2017, 78 percent of the positions in the Army were open to women. It was only in 2015 that the Department of Defense dropped its ban on women in combat roles, and integration of women into these MOS's has been slow. In the U.S. Air Force, in 2015, 99% of career fields are open to women, with the exceptions of Special Tactics Officer, Combat Control, Special Operations Weather Technician, Combat Rescue Officer, Pararescue and Tactical Air Control Party.

In 2013, female US Army soldiers enrolled in a training course designed by Combined Joint Task Force Paladin, specifically designed for Female Engagement Team members. The course was intended to train female soldiers for tasks such as unexploded ordnance awareness, biometrics, forensics, evidence collection, tactical questioning, vehicle and personnel searches, and homemade explosive devices.

By May 2015, none of the nineteen women vying to become the first female Army Rangers had passed Ranger School. Eleven of the nineteen dropped out in the first four days. Of the remaining eight who failed in the next step, three were given the option to restart from the beginning. Two graduated in August 2015. A third graduated in October 2015.

In April 2015, the Marine Corps' Infantry Officer Course, which had been gender-integrated for two and a half years for research purposes, ended without a single female graduate. The final two participants failed the initial Combat Endurance Test.

In 2016, Secretary of Defense Ash Carter opened all military occupations to women, without exception. This opened up roughly 10% of all military jobs that had previously been closed to women, including positions in infantry, armor, reconnaissance, and some special operations units.

Women have been injured, killed, and awarded high honors. Two women received the Silver Star for their actions in combat: Sergeant Leigh Ann Hester in 2005 and Army Specialist Monica Lin Brown in 2007. More than 10,000 combat action badges were awarded to women who served in combat in Iraq and Afghanistan.

In 2022, the United States Army revised its 40-year-old fitness test – the Army Physical Fitness Test – with the new Army Combat Fitness Test. The test originally included leg tucks and was graded on an even field between age and gender. These factors lead to a low portion of female soldiers meeting adequate fitness scores, with 44% failing. The Army has since updated the exam, replacing leg tucks with a plank and grading based on a matrix that accounts for age and gender. This policy change allowed a majority of female soldiers to meet standards and set a precedent for breaking uniformity in expectations.

In February 2023, a series of new policies were published by the US Defense Department in order to support military members. Anyone who receives an abortion could travel out of state and receive three weeks of administrative leave.

==== Physical, social, and cultural issues ====
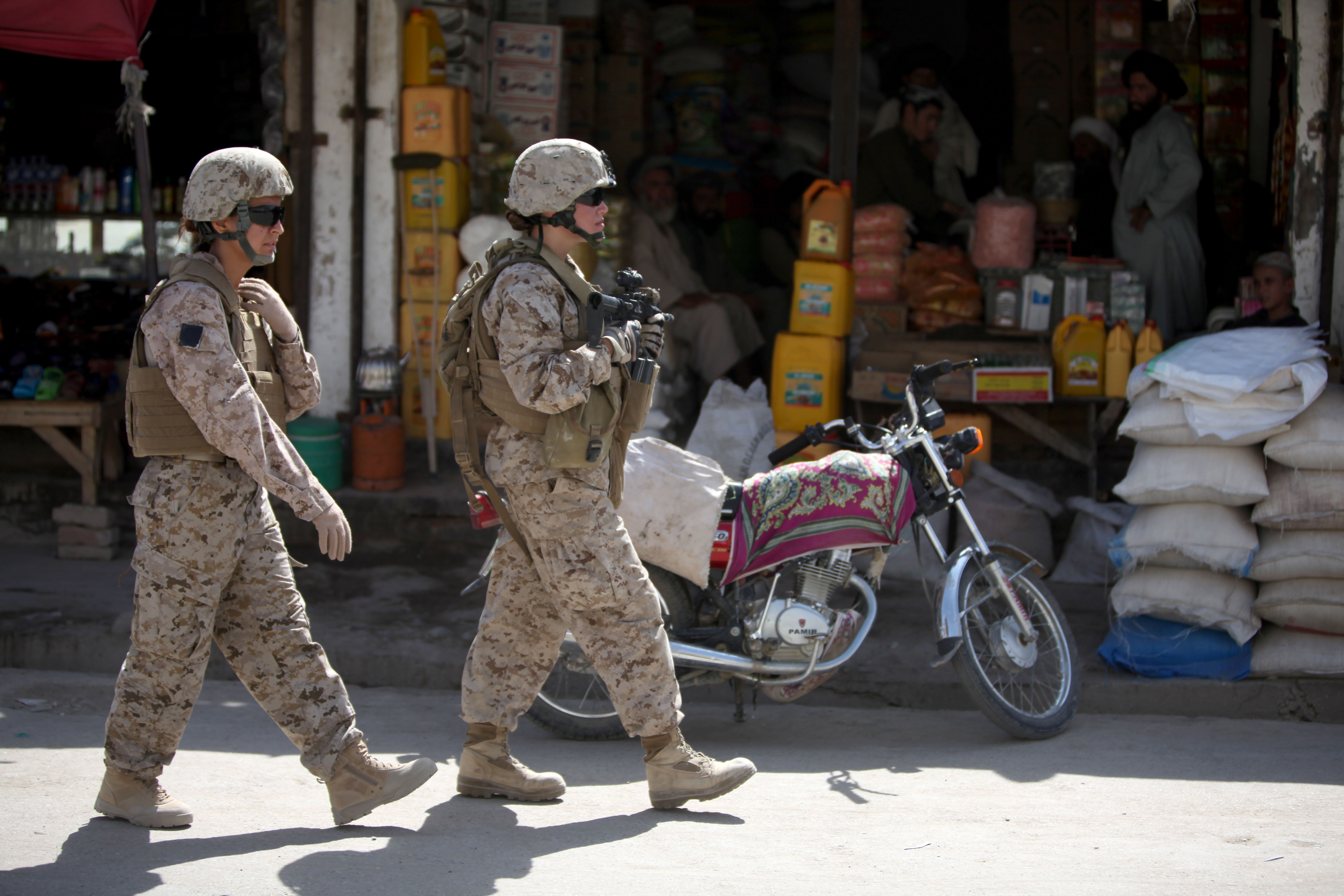
Two members of a U.S. Marine Corps Female Engagement Team patrolling an Afghan town in 2010

A 2015 Marine Corps study found that women in a unit created to assess female combat performance were significantly injured twice as often as men, were less accurate with infantry weapons, and were less skilled at removing wounded troops from the battlefield.

The study assessed a nine-month experiment at Camp Lejeune, North Carolina, and Twentynine Palms, California. About 400 Marines, including 100 women, volunteered to participate.

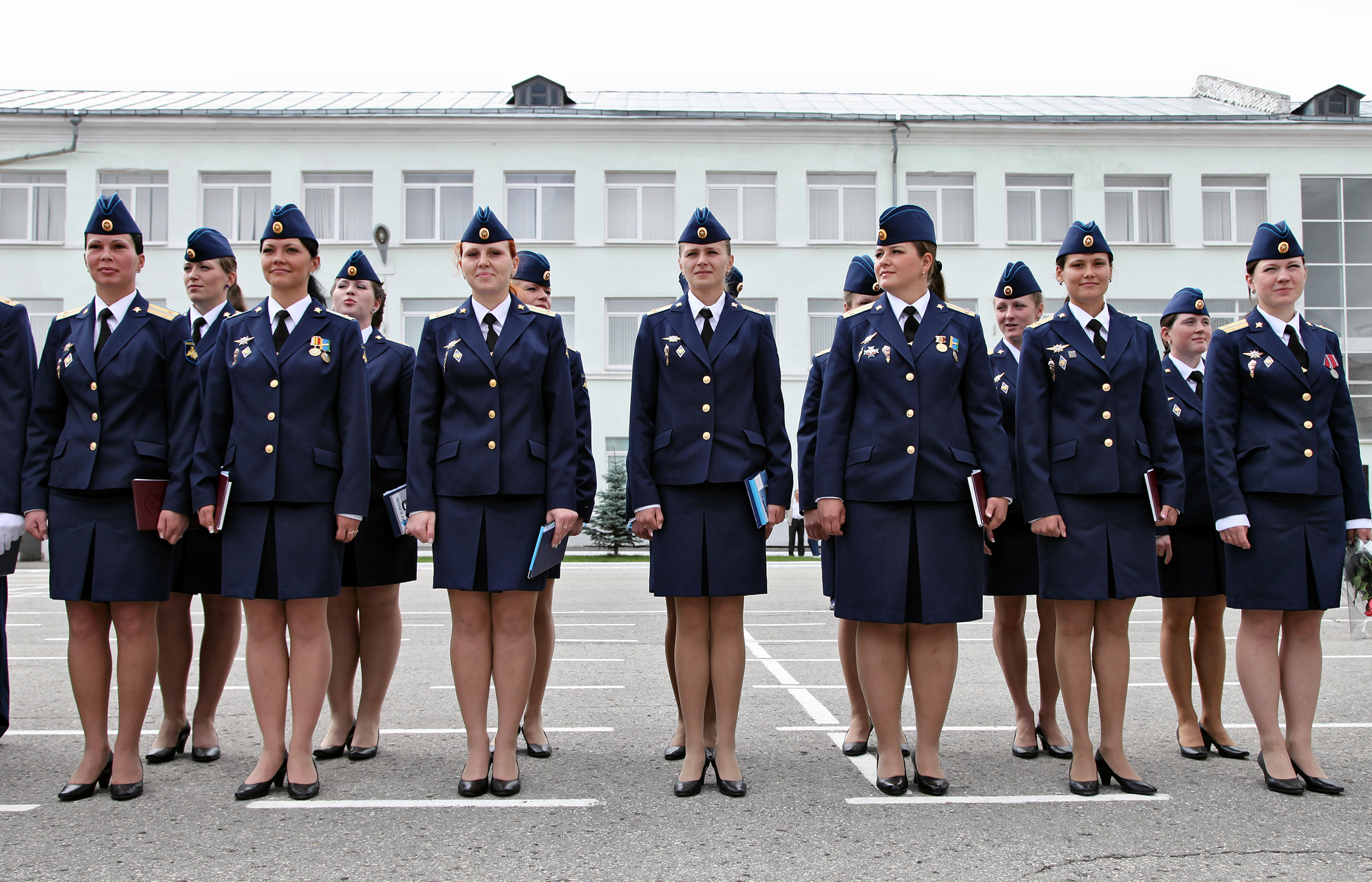
Russian military female contingent in their formal wear during a parade in 2013

Male squads, teams, and crews demonstrated better performance on 93 of 134 tasks evaluated (69 percent) than units with women in them. Male units were faster while completing tactical movements in combat situations, especially in units with large "crew-served" weapons such as heavy machine guns and mortars. Male infantry squads had better accuracy than squads with women in them, with "a notable difference between genders for every individual weapons system" used by infantry rifleman units. The M4 carbine, M27 infantry automatic rifle, and M203 single-shot grenade launcher were assessed.

Male Marines who had not received infantry training were more accurate than women who had received training. In removing wounded troops from the battlefield, "notable differences in execution times were found between all-male and gender-integrated groups".

Unit cohesion was lower in mixed-gender units. Many female soldiers reported that the way they are viewed by male soldiers is often detrimental to their participation. For instance, female soldiers are often labeled as "either standoffish or a slut". In order to avoid such labels, female soldiers have to spend time with fellow soldiers strategically, without spending too much time with any one of them. This approach often has an isolating effect. In several instances, women were considered less skilled than male soldiers, so were not given opportunities to complete tasks for which they were qualified.

According to Lieutenant Colonel Dave Grossman, author of On Killing: The Psychological Cost of Learning to Kill in War and Society, Israeli soldiers reacted with uncontrollable protectiveness and aggression after seeing a woman wounded. Further, Islamic militants rarely, if ever, surrender to female soldiers, lessening the IDF's ability to take prisoners. Iraqi and Afghan civilians are often not intimidated by female soldiers. However, in socially conservative environments, female combat soldiers can search female civilians, and children and women are more likely to talk to female soldiers than to male soldiers.

==== Sexual violence ====
One 2009 report concluded that military women were three times more likely to be raped than civilians, and that women soldiers in Iraq were more likely to be attacked by another soldier than by an insurgent. In 1988, the first military-wide sexual harassment survey found that 64% of military women had been subjected to some form of sexual harassment. The most affected were Native Americans, followed by Hispanics and African-Americans.

U.S. Senator Martha McSally, an Arizona Republican, said during a Senate meeting on sexual assault in the military that she was raped by a superior officer in the U.S. Air Force. McSally was the first female combat pilot in the U.S. Air Force. She said that she never reported it because so many people did not trust the system, she blamed herself, was ashamed and confused, and thought she was strong but felt powerless.

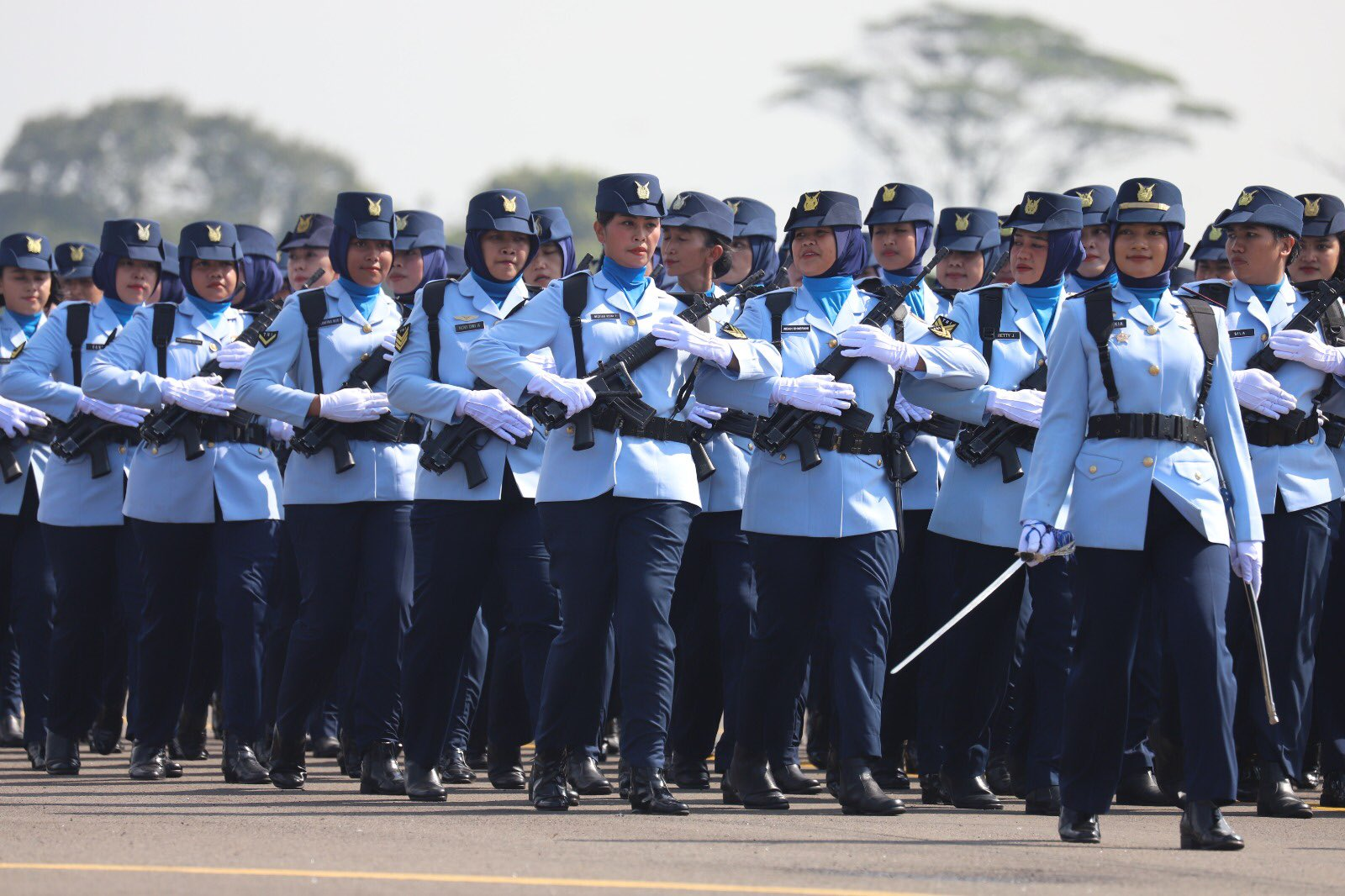
Indonesian Air Force Women personnel

Sexual assault is more likely to occur in the military than in the civilian population. One-in-four active-duty female military personnel will be sexually assaulted. The military has a Code of Justice which defines sexual assault, rape, aggravated assault, abusive sexual assault, nonconsensual sodomy (forced oral or anal sex), or attempts to commit these acts.

All of these acts are punishable by military law, which begins with the victim going forward to their commander. It is then the commander's job to make an inquiry on the perpetrator, however, they also have the right to dismiss the claims. They also have the right to issue non-judicial punishment or take the claim to a higher authority. The perpetrator's punishment can range from dismissal to dishonorable discharge, to confinement in military prison. If convicted of rape, the perpetrator could be imprisoned for life or in extreme cases even executed. 83 percent of women who reported sexual assault stated that their experiences with military legal personnel made them reluctant to seek further help.

Many victims in the military describe the response to and aftermath of sexual assault as more painful than the assault itself because of the unspoken "code of silence", which implies that women should keep quiet about their assault and not come forward to take action. Women expect that little will be done, so most cases go unreported. When they are reported and taken to court, only ten percent of cases have the perpetrator charged for their crimes.

Female soldiers have developed several techniques for avoiding sexual assault "including: (1) relying on support networks [buddy systems], (2) capitalizing on their status (associated with rank, age, time spent in the military, or prior deployment experience), and (3) masking femininity through clothing to minimize violence exposure and to keep themselves and others safe during military service". Such strategies leave the burden of addressing the problem on potential victims. Conversely, in many units, soldiers pair off as "buddies" who watch out for each other. In mostly male units, females buddy up with males, who then often become excessively protective, reducing the female's agency.

A lawsuit seeks redress for military plaintiffs who claim to have been subjected to sexual assault. The Invisible War addresses this lawsuit and topic.

==== Effects of sexual assault ====
Sexual assault leads to many health problems, such as anxiety disorders, post-traumatic stress disorder (PTSD), depression, substance abuse, binge eating, dissociation and memory impairment, suicidal and parasuicidal behavior, sexual dysfunction and dissatisfaction, poor self-esteem, and personality disorders, such as borderline personality disorder. It also takes a toll on physical health, and many women have reported menstrual complications, headaches, back pain, and gastrointestinal pain.

All of these factors make it hard for women to stay in the military; sexual assault is the leading cause for early leave of women in the armed forces. Working for — and living alongside — perpetrators of sexual violence exacerbates the difficulties that victims in the military face. This close relationship creates a new type of trauma as the victim is forced to see the perpetrator every day, fomenting distrust in others. Once leaving the military, these women often have a hard time reintegrating back into society. Difficulties include challenges with close relationships, occupational adjustments and homelessness.

A 2000 study found that these women were more likely to fail to complete college and earn incomes less than $25,000. Their work can involve frequent interactions with their attacker, which damages trust in the institution. Perpetrators are typically in a higher position and are supposed to have protected the woman, which can increase trauma.

Updated military training focuses on bystander interventions and the role of consent in sexual activity, emphasizing the responsibility of male soldiers. Some female soldiers assume the classically male role of "protector". This works to change women's "responsibility for preventing rape" and requires that male soldiers acknowledge their responsibility to engage with female soldiers in all activities.

== Gender roles in the military ==
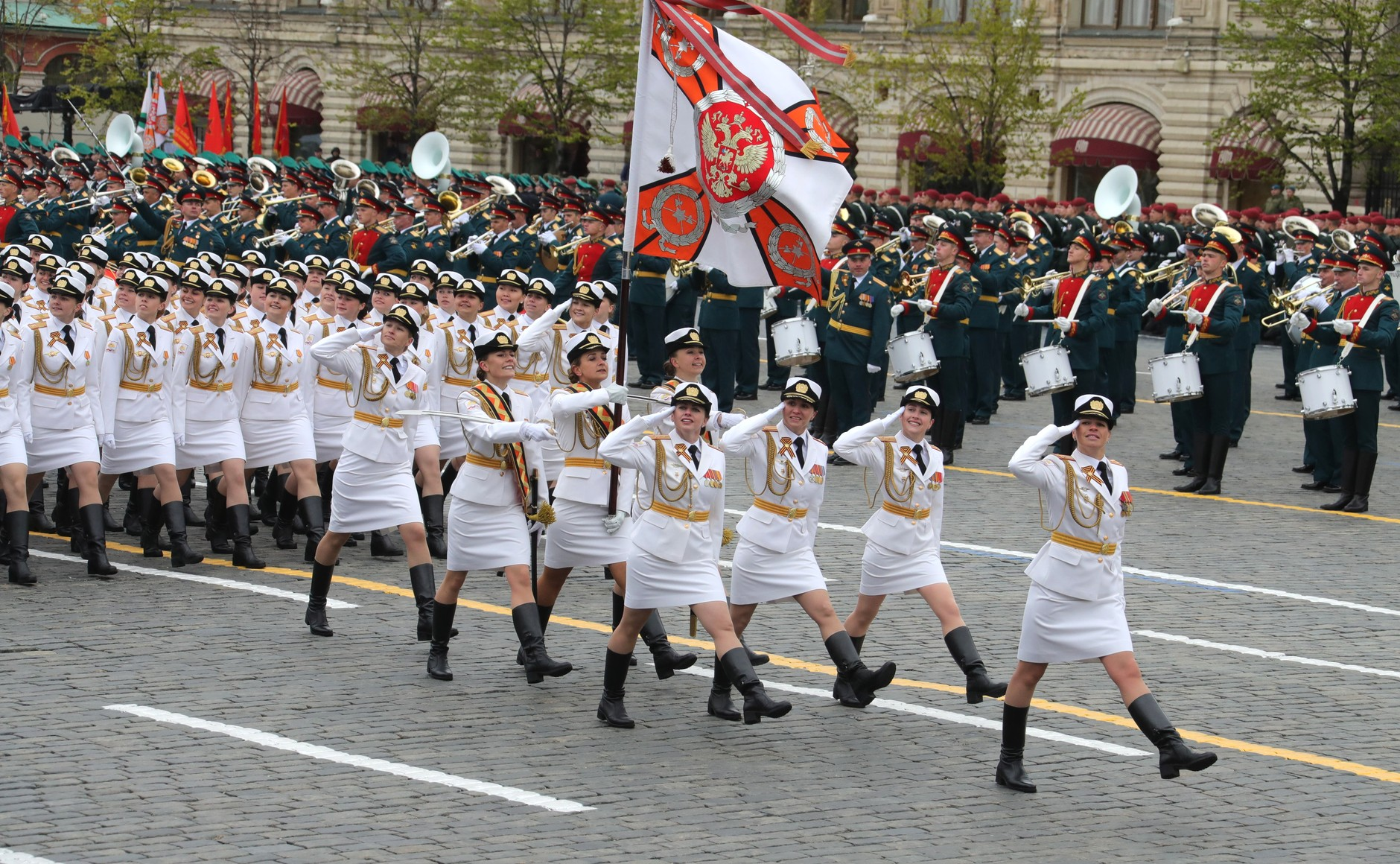
Russian female cadets

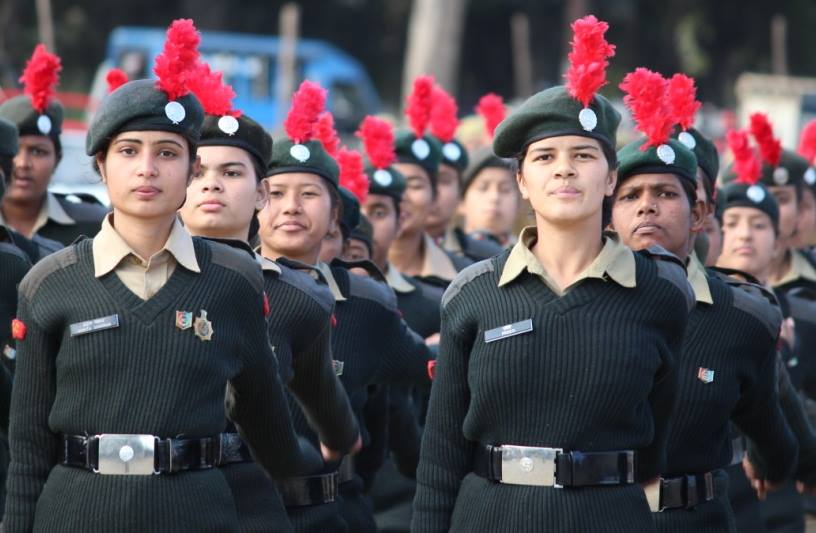
Female cadets of the National Cadet Corps, India

A 2008 study found that female cadets saw military training as an "opportunity to be strong, assertive and skillful" and saw such training "as an escape from some of the negative aspects of traditional femininity". The female cadets also believed that the ROTC program was "gender-blind" and "gender-neutral". The study claims that female cadets "were hyper-vigilant about their status as women, performing tasks traditionally seen as men's work and often felt that they had to constantly prove they were capable."

The study quoted one female cadet: "in the Navy the joke is that a woman in the Navy is either a bitch, a slut or a lesbian, and none of them are good categories to fall into, and if you are stern with your people then you are a bitch, but if you're a guy and stern people are like, wow, I respect him for being a good leader."

84 percent of cadets said they did not want a military career as it would interfere with marriage and raising children.

A 2009 study examined the attitudes of West Point cadets, Reserve Officer Training Corps (ROTC) cadets, and non-military-affiliated students from civilian colleges toward a variety of military roles. Cadets were less approving of assigning women to certain military jobs than others.

As of 2018, only two women have completed the United States Marine's Infantry Officer Course, while in 2016, 86% of women failed the Marines' combat jobs test.

=== Gender-mixed accommodation in Scandinavia ===
Several Scandinavian forces have experimented with or institutionalized gender-mixed rooms. In Sweden, mixed sleeping quarters have been the default arrangement since the early 1990s (following women's entry into all military positions in the 1980s), and research tracing the practice from the first cohorts of women in the 1980s argues that co-lodging became a taken-for-granted tool for building unit cohesion while also shaping the conditions of women's inclusion in the soldier collective.

Denmark introduced mixed accommodation in 2015 during home-station training, but studies of deployments note that when Danish women are later housed separately on allied (often U.S.-run) bases, it can undermine social integration and operational routines (e.g., information flow, readiness), highlighting how accommodation rules affect professionalism and inclusion.

In Norway, a 2021 study which randomly assigned some men in Norwegian bootcamp to mixed-gender squads and others to male squads found that men in the integrated squads did not perform worse or become less satisfied with their service than the other men, either during boot camp or their subsequent military assignment. Furthermore, the men in the integrated squads developed more egalitarian attitudes.

=== On submarines ===
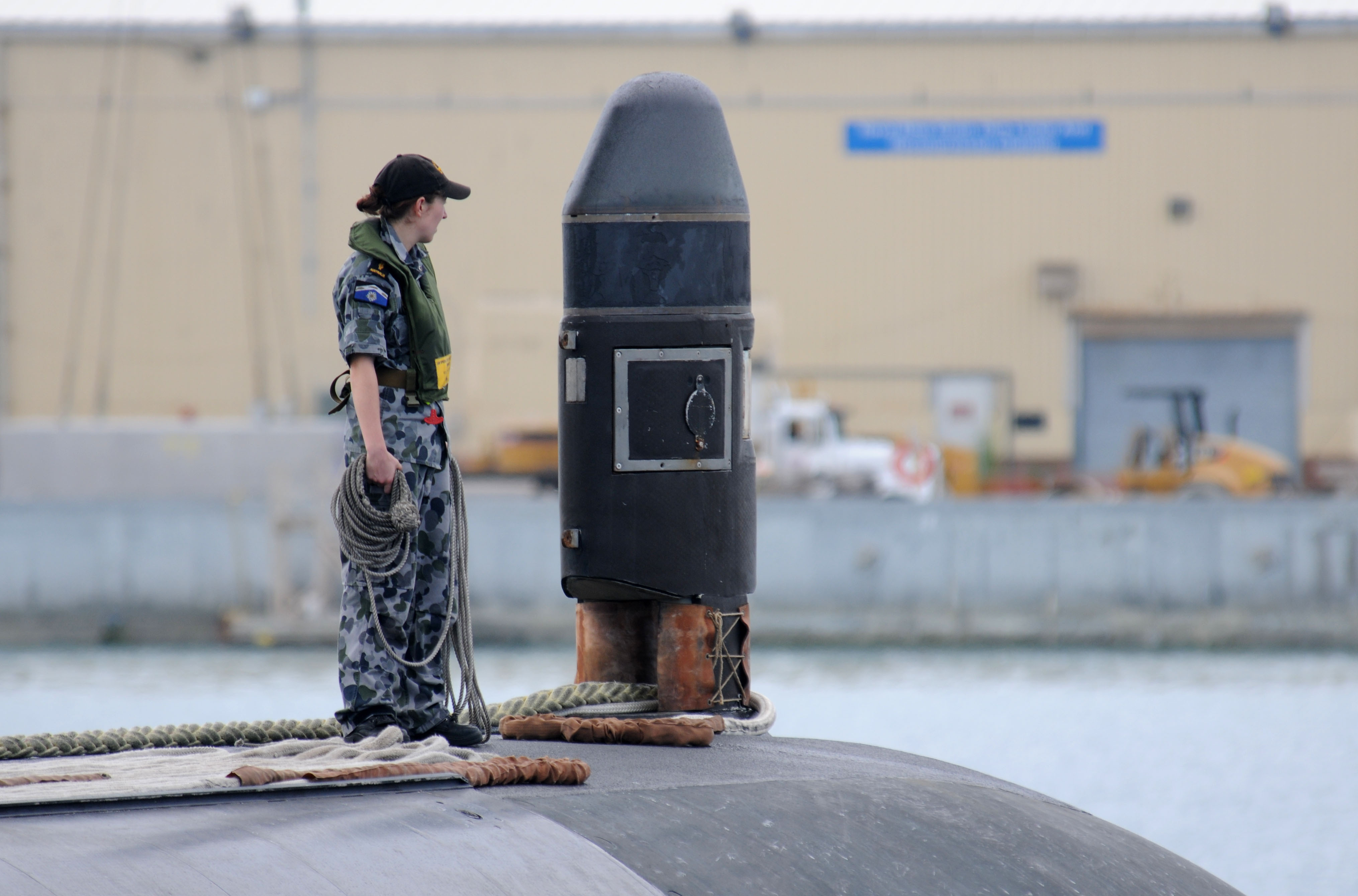
A female Royal Australian Navy submariner aboard HMAS Waller in 2013

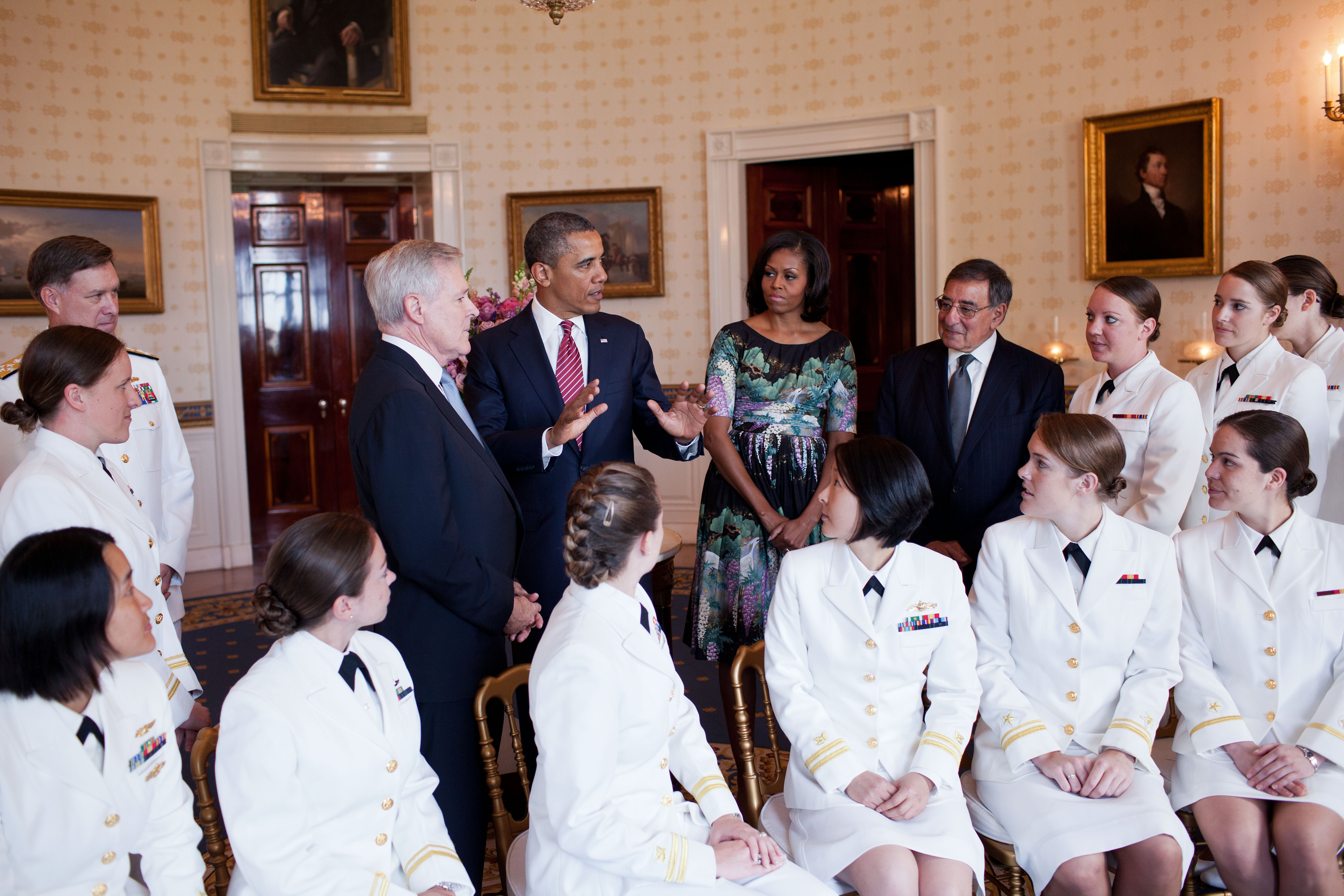
U.S. Navy's women submariners meet President Obama and other dignitaries, 2012

In 1985, the Royal Norwegian Navy became the first navy in the world to permit female personnel to serve in submarines. The first female submarine commander was Captain Solveig Krey aboard the first Kobben class submarine on 11 September 1995. The Danish Navy allowed women on submarines in 1988, the Swedish Navy in 1989, followed by the Royal Australian Navy in 1998, Canada in 2000 and Spain.

On 29 April 2010, the United States Navy authorized women to serve aboard submarines. Previously, objections such as the need for separate accommodation and facilities (estimates that modifying submarines to accommodate women would cost $300,000 per bunk versus $4,000 per bunk on aircraft carriers) had prevented the change. The Navy stated that larger SSGN and SSBN submarines had more available space and could accommodate female officers with little/no modification. Qualified female candidates with the desire to serve were available. (Women then represented 15 percent of active duty sailors and were earning about half of all science and engineering bachelor's degrees.)

In May 2014, it was announced that three women had become the UK Royal Navy's first female submariners.

On 15 November 2017, the first Argentinean female submarine officer, Eliana Krawczyk, disappeared in the Atlantic Ocean after the Argentine Navy lost contact with the submarine ARA San Juan after a reported failure in the electric system. As one of the 44 crew members lost at sea, Krawczyk was honored by the country's Jewish community as "La Reina De Los Mares" on International Women's Day in 2018.

On 4 July 2017, after two years of training, four female officers boarded a French SSBN for France's first seventy-day mixed gender patrol. The next generation of French submarines is designed to welcome women.

Women are expected to join submarine crews in the Royal Netherlands Navy in 2019, with the addition of shower doors and changing-room curtains.

In 2020, Risa Takenouchi became the first female student to enroll in Japan's MSDF Submarine Training Center, following the overturning of restrictions on women submariners.

=== In combat ===
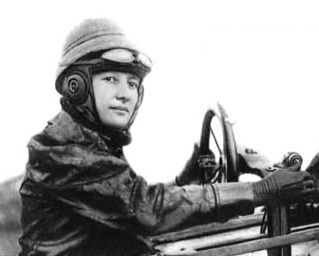
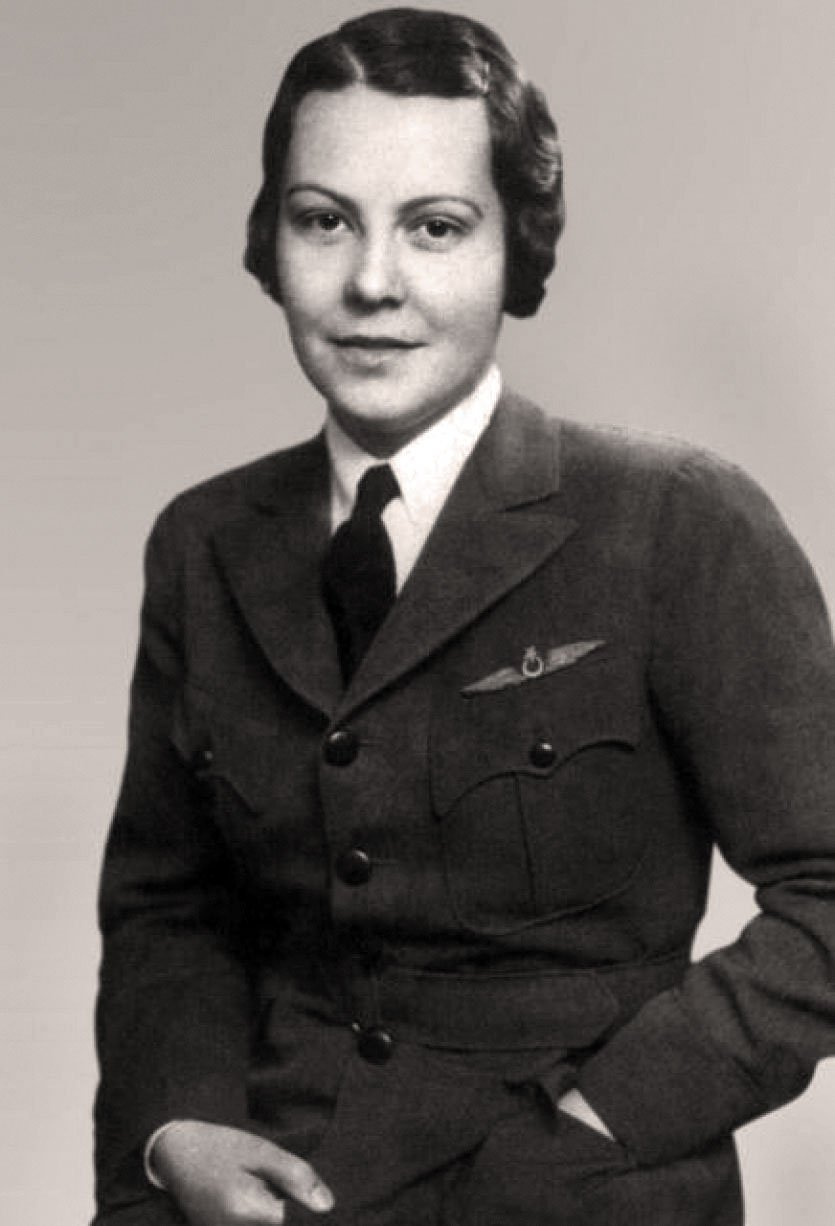
Marie Marvingt (left) was the first female pilot to fly during a wartime though she was never in combat while Sabiha Gökçen was the first female combat pilot.

Some nations allow female soldiers to serve in certain combat arms positions. Others exclude them for various reasons, including physical demands and privacy policies. In the Nordic countries with standing armies (Denmark, Finland, Norway, and Sweden), women were integrated in combat positions in the 1980s and early 1990s.

Among the NATO nations, and as of the mid-1970s, women were able to attain military status in the following countries: Belgium, Canada, Denmark, France, the Federal Republic of Germany, Greece, the Netherlands, Norway, Portugal, Turkey, the United Kingdom, and the United States.

Non-conscription countries, notably the United States, the United Kingdom, and Canada, are where the highest levels of female military presences have been achieved. Canada is marked as particularly progressive in its early implementation of gender equality practices. A rise in the call for equal opportunity coupled with the decline of able-bodied men willing to enter military service coaxed countries to reform policies toward female inclusion. With the opening of submarine service in 2000, women had free rein to enlist in any kind of military service.

=== Drone operators ===
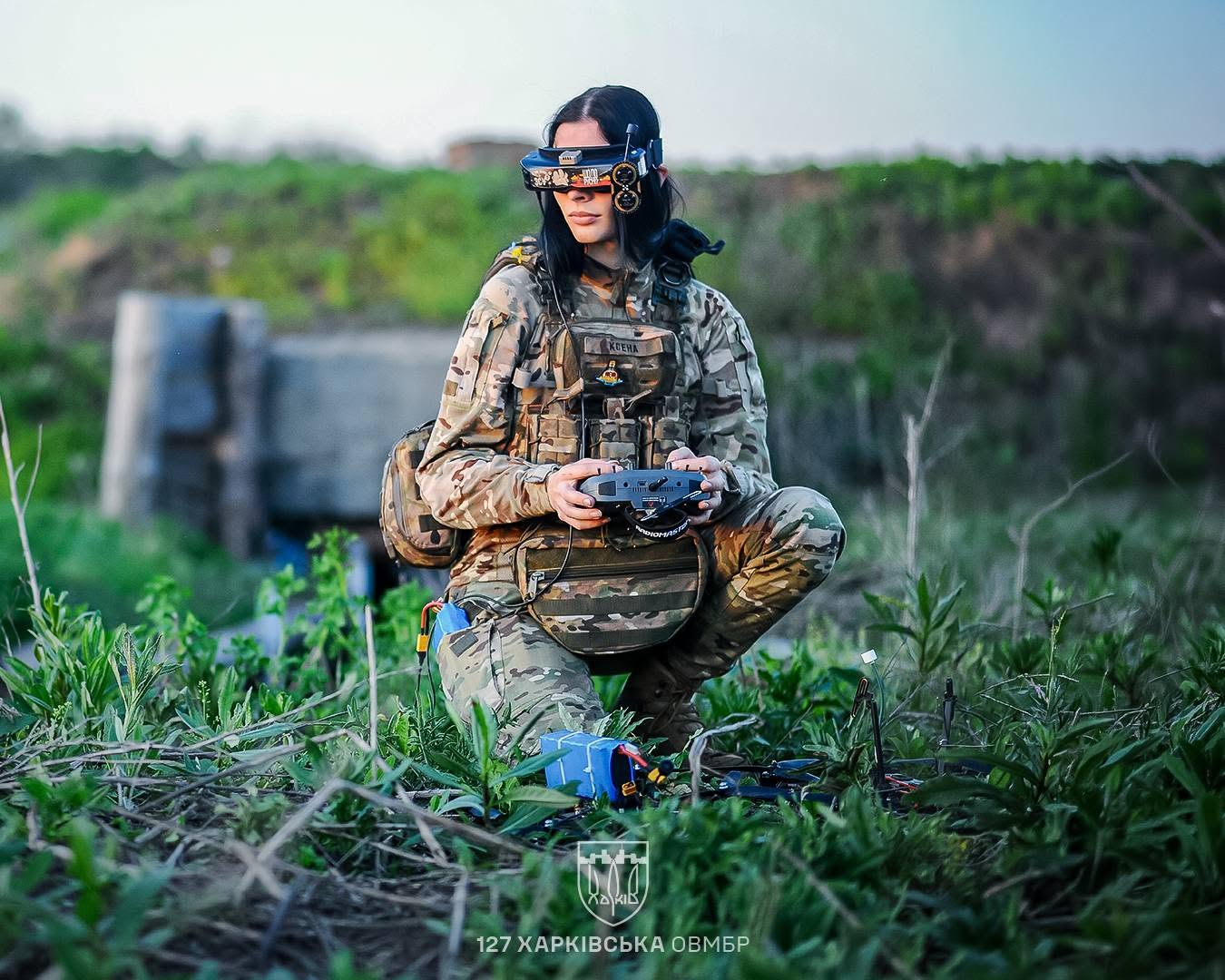
"Ksena", an FPV drone operator in the Kharkiv-based 127th Heavy Mechanized Brigade (c. June 2026)

Since the 2022 Russian invasion of Ukraine, women in the Ukrainian military (Note: Military or "Defence Forces of Ukraine" in the broadest sense. Not all strike drone units of Ukraine are part of the Unmanned Systems Forces (USF) (a branch of the Armed Forces of Ukraine, ZSU), which in April 2026 accounted for c. 31.15% of all Russian personnel losses inflicted by Ukrainian drone operations. Other Ukrainian military and security organisations employing strike (and reconnaissance) drones include (but are not limited to) the National Guard of Ukraine (such as units within the 13th Khartiia Brigade and 1st Azov Corps), the Security Service of Ukraine (SBU, known for Operation Spiderweb), the Defence Intelligency of Ukraine (HUR), and the State Border Guard Service of Ukraine, while USVs such as the Sea Baby are operated by the Ukrainian Navy in coordination with the HUR and SBU.) have increasingly served as drone operators and in drone-supporting functions, a role previously almost exclusively taken by men. As women in Ukraine are not subject to the 2022 Ukrainian mobilisation, (Note: As of 2026, mobilisation in Ukraine only applies to men of military age who are medically fit to serve and do not serve other important functions in Ukraine's war-time economy. The military reforms announced by the Ministry of Defence of Ukraine on 12 June 2026 does foresee a gradual transformation from a conscript-based to a contract-based force, with certain combat roles replaced by voluntary Ukrainian citizens, foreign citizens, or unmanned systems such as ground robots. But as long as there is a personnel shortage on the front lines, the Ministry deems it impossible to discharge certain mobilised men from military duty, depending on circumstances.) they join on a voluntary basis, primarily motivated by a sense of duty to their country and their fellow Ukrainians. (Note: '"Russia has come to our land and is killing us. What more motivation do you need?" Zoits, a drone operator, speaks with the calm precision of someone who has destroyed a Russian tank, standing tall despite her petite frame. Once civilians with careers in sports, marketing, and sales, more Ukrainian women are now picking up military uniforms as Russia's full-scale invasion rages on into its fourth year.') (Note: Yuliia: "I had no fear. What could be more frightening than realizing that while Russians are killing and torturing Ukrainians, I am resting at home?")

== See also ==
- Women in war
- Women in combat
- Women in warfare and the military (1945–1999)
- Women in warfare and the military (2000–present)
- Women in the military in Europe
- Women in the Philippine military
- Women in the military in the Americas
- Women in the United States Army
- Women in the United States Marine Corps
- Women in the United States Navy
- Women in the United States Air Force
- Women in the United States Coast Guard
- Women in the United States Space Force
- Puerto Rican women in the military
- List of women warriors in folklore
- Gender in security studies
- Wartime cross-dressers
