= Women in the United States Space Force =

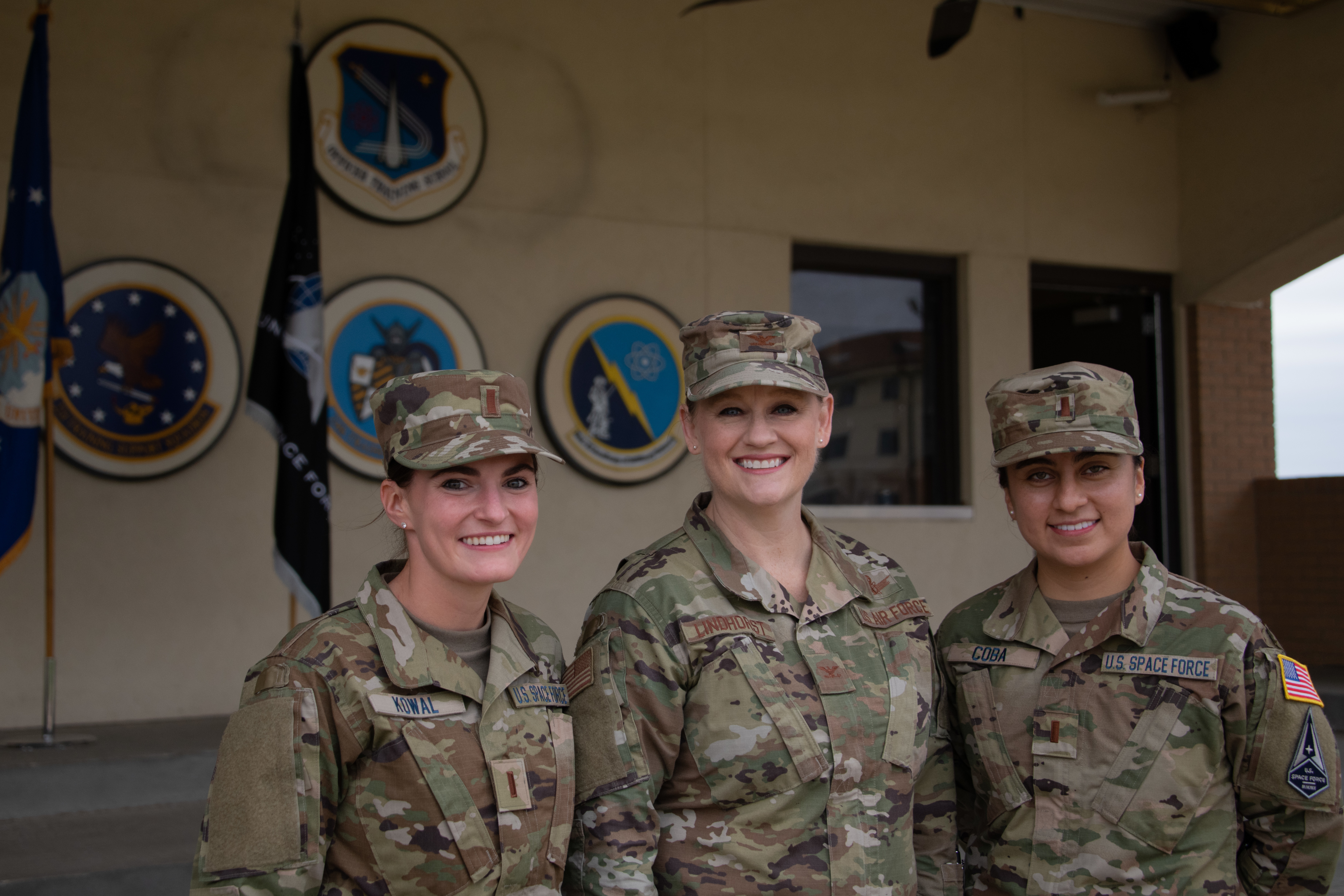
Female graduates of the Space Force officer training school at Maxwell Air Force Base, Alabama.

There have been women in the United States Space Force since the branch's inception in 2019. It is the only branch of the United States military where women have always had equal roles.

On 23 July 2020 the Space Force obtained its first all-female space operations crew. On 17 August of that year Nina M. Armagno became the first female Air Force general officer to transfer to the Space Force and the first female general officer in the Space Force. On 1 October of the same year Taryn Stys and Karmann-Monique Pogue were each promoted to chief master sergeant, making them the first women in the Space Force to attain the rank. DeAnna Burt became the first major general in the Space Force after transferring from the Air Force on 7 May 2021.

In 2024, when Bree Fram, an openly trans woman, was promoted to the rank of colonel in the Space Force, she became the highest ranking openly transgender person in the Space Force and the entire United States military.

Air Force Major General Clinton E. Crosier, who is also the United States Space Force’s director of planning, has stated that the Space Force is looking for new policies to create a culture of equality and inclusion.

== List of women general officers in the United States Space Force ==
- Lt Gen Nina M. Armagno
- Lt Gen DeAnna M. Burt
- Brig Gen Nikki Frankino
- Lt Gen Leah Lauderback
- Brig Gen Kristin L. Panzenhagen
- Lt Gen Donna D. Shipton

== See also ==
- Women in the military
- Women in the United States Air Force
- United States Space Force
