= Shelley (name) =

- Pronunciation: /ˈʃɛli/ SHEL-ee
- Gender: Unisex
- Language: English

Origin
- Language: English
- Origin: Shelley (various places)
- Derivation: Old English: scylf + lēaf
- Meaning: 'clearing on a bank/shelf'
- Region of origin: England

Other names
- Variant form: Shelly
- Related names: Shirley, Michelle, Michel, Michele, Sheldon, Shelton, Rachelle, Rochelle, Shel

Shelley is a given name and surname. In many baby name books, Shelley is listed as meaning 'meadow's edge' or 'clearing on a bank'. It is Old English in origin. As with many other names (Courtney, Ashley, etc.), Shelley is today a name given almost exclusively to girls after historically being male. It is commonly used as a nickname for Michelle (and formerly as a variant of Shirley). Shelley is also a transferred surname used by those in Essex, Suffolk and Yorkshire, particularly in settlements where a wood/clearing was beside a ledge or hillside. Shelly is a common alternative spelling. It is featured in tile on the ceiling of the Library of Congress in Washington D.C.

Notable people with the name include:

== Surname ==
- Adolphus Edward Shelley (1812–1854), the first Auditor-General in British Hong Kong
- Alex Shelley (born 1983), stage name of American wrestler Patrick Martin
- Alexander Shelley (born 1979), English conductor
- Arthur Shelley (fl.1905), British footballer
- Barbara Shelley (1932–2021), English actress
- Bert Shelley (1899–1971), English footballer
- Brian Shelley (born 1981), Irish footballer
- Burke Shelley (1950–2022), Welsh musician, member of rock group Budgie
- Sir Bysshe Shelley, 1st Baronet (1731–1815), grandfather of Percy Bysshe Shelley
- Carla Shelley (born 1965), film producer
- Carole Shelley (1939–2018), English actress
- Cindy Shelley (born 1960), British actress
- Danny Shelley (born 1990), English footballer
- David Shelley (1957–2015), American blues rock musician
- David Shelley (publisher) (born 1976), British book publisher
- Deck Shelley (1906–1968), American football player
- Duke Shelley (born 1996), American football player
- Elbert Shelley (born 1964), American football player
- Sir Frederic Shelley, 8th Baronet (1809–1869), cleric and landowner
- George Shelley (singer) (born 1993), English singer, member of group Union J
- George Ernest Shelley (1840–1910), English geologist and ornithologist
- George M. Shelley (1849–1927), Mayor of Kansas City, Missouri
- Gerard Shelley (1891–1980), British linguist, author and translator
- Gladys Shelley (1911–2003), American lyricist and composer
- Harry Rowe Shelley (1858–1947), American composer
- Howard Shelley (born 1950), British pianist and conductor
- Hugh Shelley (1910–1978), American baseball player of the 1930s and 1940s
- Jack Shelley (footballer) (1905–1979), Australian footballer
- James Shelley (1884–1961), New Zealand university professor
- Jaz Shelley (born 2000), Australian basketball player
- Jeremy Shelley (born 1990), American football placekicker
- Jim Shelley (disambiguation), multiple people
- Jody Shelley (born 1976), Canadian ice hockey player
- Joe Shelley (1892–1966), Australian footballer
- John Shelley (disambiguation), multiple people
- Joshua Shelley (1920–1990), American actor
- Kate Shelley (1863–1912), Irish-born US railroad heroine
- Kenneth Shelley (born 1951), American figure skater
- Kevin Shelley (born 1955), American politician
- Lee Shelley (born 1956), American fencer
- Lilian Shelley (1892–c.1933), English music hall entertainer
- Louise Shelley (born 1952), American university professor
- Martha Shelley (born 1943), American writer
- Mary Shelley (1797–1851), English writer, author of the novel Frankenstein
- Mary Michael Shelley (born 1950), American folk artist
- Michael Shelley (disambiguation), multiple people
- Nancy Shelley (died 2010), Australian peace activist
- Norman Shelley (1903–1980), English actor
- Paul Shelley (born 1942), English actor
- Paul Shelley (politician) (born 1959), Canadian politician
- Percy Shelley (potter) (1860–1937), English potter
- Percy Bysshe Shelley (1792–1822), English poet, husband of Mary Shelley
- Sir Percy Shelley, 3rd Baronet (1819–1889), son of Percy Bysshe Shelley and Mary Shelley
- Pete Shelley (1955–2018), English musician, lead singer of Buzzcocks
- Peter Shelley (1943–2023), British 1970s pop singer
- Rachel Shelley (born 1969), English actress
- Rebecca Shelley (1887–1984), American pacifist
- Rex Shelley (1930–2009), Eurasian Singaporean author
- Richard Shelley (died c.1586), English Catholic under Elizabeth I
- Richard Shelley (grand prior) (c.1513–c.1589), English diplomat
- Rick Shelley (1947–2001), American science fiction writer
- Robert Shelley (1941–2023), American politician from Florida
- Rodney Shelley (born 2002), American football player
- Ronald G. Shelley (1932–2003), philatelist
- Samuel Shelley (1750–1808), English miniaturist and water-colour painter
- Sir Sidney Shelley, 8th Baronet (1880–1965), relative of Percy Bysshe Shelley
- Steve Shelley (born 1962), American drummer, member of group Sonic Youth
- Timothy Shelley (1753–1844), English politician, father of Percy Bysshe Shelley
- Troy Shelley, American politician
- Walter Shelley, 17th-century politician, colonist of Jamestown, Virginia
- Wanda Shelley (born 1969), American television producer
- Sir William Shelley (c.1480–1549), English judge
- Shelley baronets

== Given name ==
=== Women ===
- Shelley Ackerman (1953–2020), American astrologer, writer, actress, and singer
- Shelley Andrews (born 1953), Canadian field hockey player
- Shelley Anna, American chemical engineer
- Shelley Archer (born 1958), Australian politician
- Shelley Beattie (1967–2008), American professional female bodybuilder and actress
- Shelley Berger, American professor
- Rochelle Shelley Berkley (born 1951), American businesswoman, politician, and attorney
- Shelley Blond (born 1970), English actress
- Shelley-Ann Brown (born 1980), Canadian bobsledder
- Shelley Chaplin (born 1984), Australian wheelchair basketball player
- Shelley Duvall (1949–2024), American actress
- Michele Shelley Fabares (born 1944), American singer and actress
- Michelle Shelley Fruin (born 1961), New Zealand cricketer
- Michelle Shelley Funke Frommeyer (born 1969), American politician
- Shelley Griffiths, New Zealand academic
- Shelley Hack (born 1947), American model and actress
- Michelle Shelley Hadfield, New Zealand paralympian
- Shelley Hennig (born 1987), American actress
- Shelley Jackson (born 1963), American writer and artist
- Michelle Shelley Kerr (born 1969), Scottish football manager
- Shelley Long (born 1949), American actress
- Shelley Parker-Chan, Australian fantasy novelist
- Shelley Ross, American television executive producer
- Shelley Rudman (born 1981), British athlete
- Shelley Rudnicki, American politician
- Shelley Sandie (born 1969), Australian basketball player
- Rachelle Shelley Shannon (born 1956), American anti-abortion extremist
- Shelley Smith (disambiguation), multiple people
- Rochelle Shelley Solomon (1963–2014), American professional tennis player
- Shelley Steiner (born 1961), Canadian Olympic fencer
- Shelley Tanaka, Canadian author and editor
- Shelley Tepperman, Canadian translator
- Shelley Turner, (born 1980) British sarcasm expert
- Rochelle Shelley Vana (born 1951), American politician
- Shelley Vance, American politician
- Michelle Shelley Williams-Walker, British politician
- Shelley Winters (1920–2006), American actress

=== Men ===
- Shelley Appleton (1919–2005), American trade union executive and attorney
- Sheldon Shelley Berman (1925–2017), American comedian and actor
- David Shelley Duncan (born 1979), American professional baseball player
- Shelley Hull (1884–1919), American actor
- Shelley Jensen, American television director and producer
- Shelley Malil (born 1984), Indian-American actor
- Shelley Mayfield (1924–2010), American golf course architect and professional golfer
- Shelley Massenburg-Smith (born 1988), American rapper, singer, and record producer
- I. Sheldon Shelley Posen, Canadian folklorist, singer, and songwriter
- Shelley Scarlett, 5th Baron Abinger (1872–1917), British peer and military officer
- Shelley Smith (disambiguation), multiple people
- Shelton Shelley Wickramasinghe (1926–2011), Sri Lankan cricketer

== Code name ==
- F. F. E. Yeo-Thomas, S.O.E. operative who had "SHELLEY" as a code name during World War II

== Fictional characters ==
- James Shelley, the title character of Shelley (TV series)
- Shelley Levene, a main character in the stage play Glengarry Glen Ross, and the 1992 film of the same name
- Shelley Marsh, Stan Marsh's older sister on South Park
- Shelley Simon, One Tree Hill character
- Shelley Unwin, a character in the British TV series Coronation Street
- Shelley Winters, a main character in the popular webcomic Scary Go Round
- Shelly Johnson, one of the main characters in Twin Peaks
- Nathan Shelley, a main character in the Apple TV series Ted Lasso

== Animals ==
- Shelley (tortoise), a tortoise on Blue Peter

== See also ==
- Shelly (disambiguation)
- Michelle (name)
- Shirley (name)
