= Women in the United States Air Force =

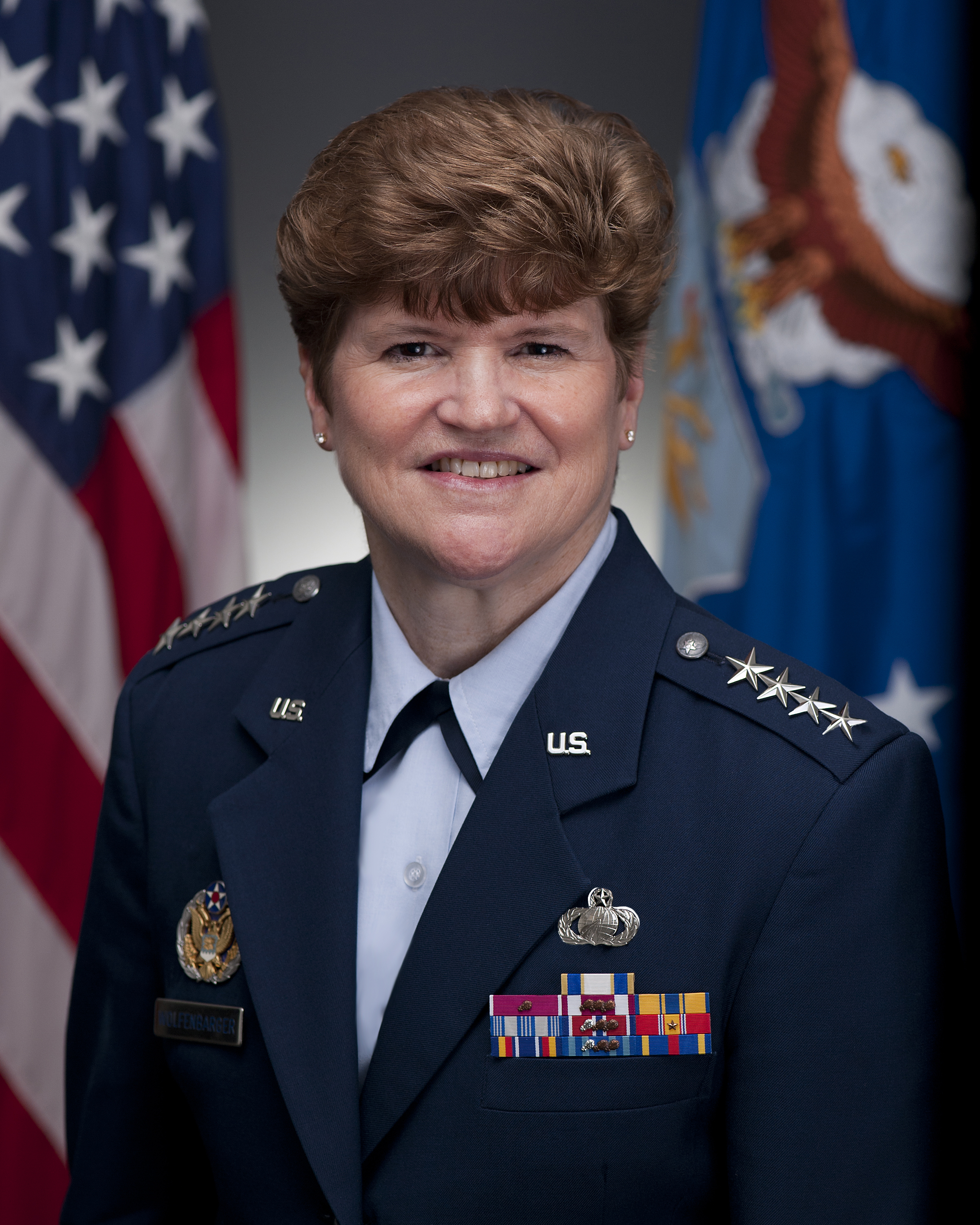
Janet Wolfenbarger became the first female four-star general in the Air Force in 2012.

There have been women in the United States Air Force since its founding in 1948, and women continue to serve in it today. During World War II, nearly 40,000 women served in the U.S. Air Force's predecessor, the United States Army Air Forces, as members in the Women's Army Corps, the Women Airforce Service Pilots, the Women's Flying Training Detachment and other related organizations.

As of 2020, there were 69,564 total women on active duty in the US Air Force, with 14,325 serving as officers, and 55,239 enlisted. Of all the branches in the US military, the Air Force has the highest percentage of female active duty service members with women making up 21.1% of the US Air Force in 2020.

== History ==
Note that some minor wars in which women served have been omitted from this history.

=== 1940s ===
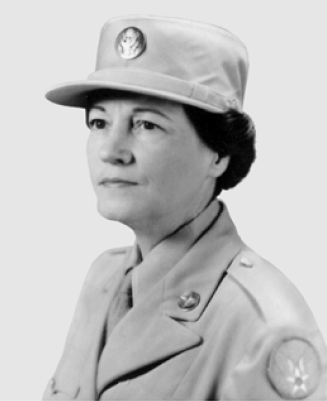
Esther McGowin Blake was the first woman in the Air Force, having enlisted in the WAF the first minute of the first hour of the first day regular Air Force duty was authorized for women on July 8, 1948.

The National Security Act of 1947 made the Air Force a separate military service. That year, some Women's Army Corps (WACs) members continued serving in the Army but performed Air Force duties. In 1948 they were able to transfer to the Women's Air Force (called WAF), and some did. WAF was created in 1948 with the Women's Armed Services Integration Act, which gave women permanent status in the Regular and Reserve forces of the Air Force. Esther McGowin Blake was the first woman in the Air Force, having enlisted in the WAF the first minute of the first hour of the first day regular Air Force duty was authorized for women on July 8, 1948. Also in 1948, Geraldine Pratt May became the first director of the WAF and was promoted to the rank of colonel making her the first woman colonel in the Air Force.

=== Korean War and after until the Vietnam War ===
During the Korean War, medical air evacuation nurses were the only women in the Air Force allowed to serve in the Korean battle zone. Other women carried out support roles at rear-echelon bases in Japan, as air traffic controllers, weather observers, radar operators, and photo interpreters. By the end of the Korean War in 1953, 12,800 WAF officers and enlisted women were serving worldwide.

According to scholars, since at least as early as 1960, Executive Order 10450 was applied to ban transgender individuals from serving in the United States military. On May 17, 1963, gender transitioned or transitioning individuals were officially prohibited from the United States military by Army Regulation 40-501. This policy reasoned transgender people were medically unqualified to serve because their mental state was considered unfit. Later, after varying restrictions over the years, there stopped being restrictions on people serving in the military due to their being transgender when President Joe Biden signed the "Executive Order on Enabling All Qualified Americans to Serve Their Country in Uniform" on January 25, 2021. However, Executive Order 14183, titled "Prioritizing Military Excellence and Readiness", an executive order issued by President Donald Trump on January 27, 2025, again banned transgender people from military service. In March 2025, a federal judge blocked the Executive Order; but in May of that year the Supreme Court allowed the Trump administration to reinstate the ban while legal challenges continue in the Ninth Circuit.

=== Vietnam War ===
600 to 800 WAFs served in Southeast Asia during the Vietnam War. In addition to serving as nurses and medical evacuation personnel, WAFs also served in a variety of support staff assignments in hospitals, with MASH Units, in service clubs, in headquarters offices, and in intelligence, as well as in a variety of personnel positions. In 1967 Public Law 90-130 was signed into law; it removed legal ceilings on women's promotions that had kept them out of the general and flag ranks, and dropped the two percent ceiling on officer and enlisted strengths for women in the armed forces. In 1969 women were allowed to join the Air Force Reserve Officers Training Corps. In 1971 Jeanne M. Holm became the first female airman promoted to brigadier general.

=== Women in the Air Force from 1972 to 2025 ===
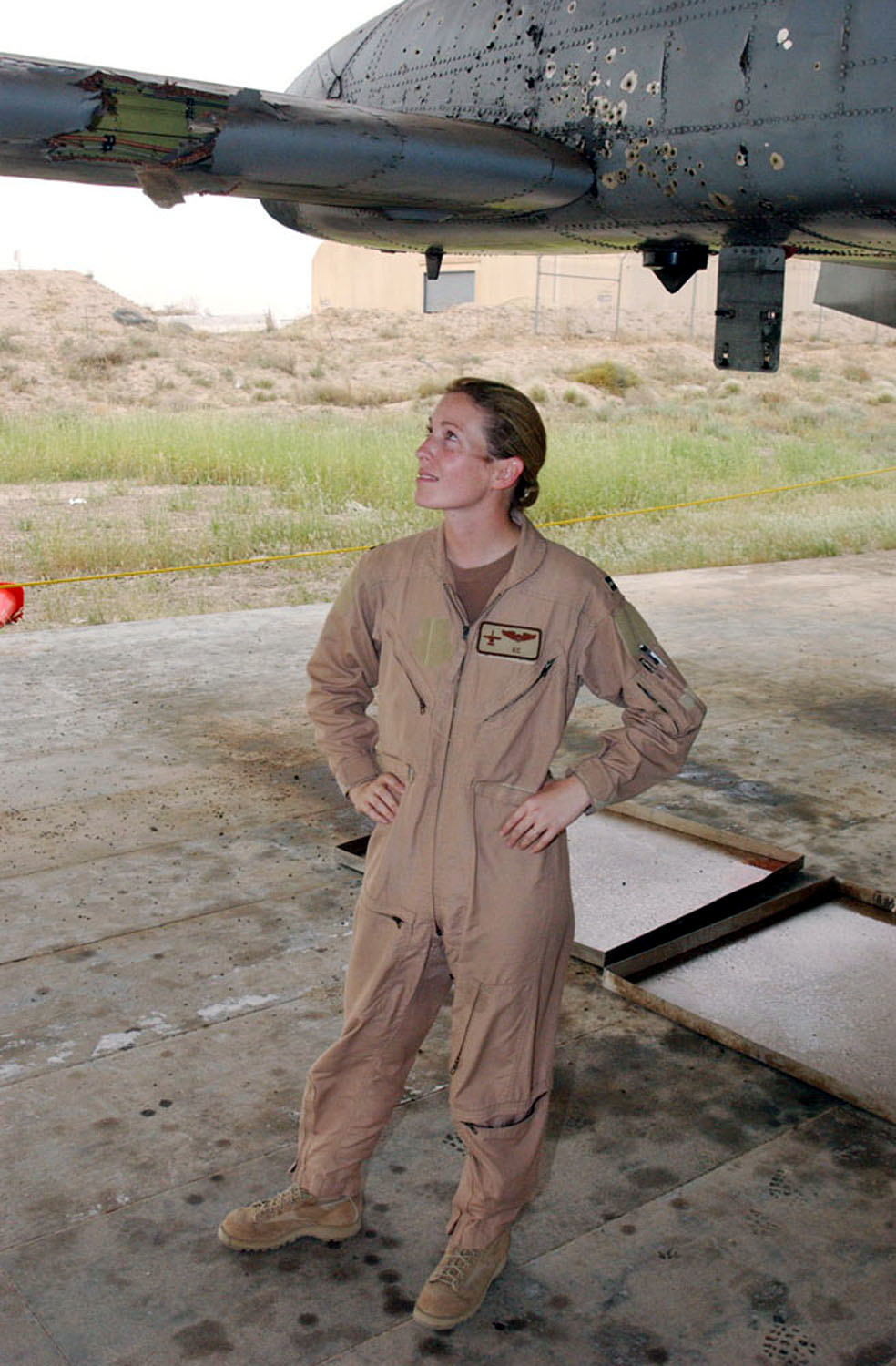
Captain Kim Campbell inspecting damage to her A-10 Thunderbolt II during the Iraq War in 2003

Frontiero v. Richardson, 411 U.S. 677 (1973), was a landmark Supreme Court case which decided that benefits given by the military to the family of service members cannot be given out differently because of sex. Air Force Lieutenant Sharron Frontiero and her husband Joseph, a veteran and full-time student, were the plaintiffs.

In 1976 the WAF was ended and women were allowed into the Air Force as equal members.

Also in 1976, the Air Force Academy first admitted women; in 1986, the Air Force Academy’s top graduate was a woman for the first time (Terrie Ann McLaughlin).

Also in 1986, six Air Force women served as pilots, copilots, and boom operators on the KC-135 and KC-10 tankers that refueled FB-111s during the raid on Libya.

Leyland v. Orr (1987) was about Air Force member Leyland, a transgender woman, who underwent a sex reassignment surgery before being discharged. The courts ruled this discharge as valid due to the reasoning that Leyland was indeed unfit physically rather than mentally. This judgement was determined by inferring that genital surgery is similar to an amputation surgery, which leaves the individual unable to meet the demands of a soldier.

Women in the Air Force served in Operation Desert Shield (1990-1991) and Operation Desert Storm (1991).

Before the "Don't Ask Don't Tell" policy was enacted in 1993, lesbians and bisexual women (and gay men and bisexual men) were banned from serving in the military. In 1993 the "Don't Ask Don't Tell" policy was enacted, which mandated that the military could not ask servicemembers about their sexual orientation. However, until the policy was ended in 2011 service members were still expelled from the military if they engaged in sexual conduct with a member of the same sex, stated that they were lesbian, gay, or bisexual, and/or married or attempted to marry someone of the same sex.

On April 28, 1993, combat exclusion was lifted from aviation positions by Les Aspin, permitting women to serve in almost any aviation capacity.

Also in 1993, Sheila Widnall became the first female Secretary of the Air Force. Although this is a civilian position, it is included in this article because having that position made Widnall the first woman to head a branch of the United States military.

In 1994, the Pentagon declared:

Service members are eligible to be assigned to all positions for which they are qualified, except that women shall be excluded from assignment to units below the brigade level whose primary mission is to engage in direct combat on the ground.

That policy also excluded women being assigned to certain organizations based upon proximity to direct combat or "collocation" as the policy specifically referred to it. According to the Army, collocation occurs when, "the position or unit routinely physically locates and remains with a military unit assigned a doctrinal mission to routinely engage in direct combat."

Kelly Flinn, sometimes referred to as Kelly Flynn, was the first female B-52 pilot in the Air Force, but was discharged from the Air Force in 1997 after an adulterous affair with the husband of an enlisted subordinate, for military offenses including disobeying a direct order from her commanding officer to break off the affair, and for lying to him about having done so. Flinn's trouble with the Air Force received widespread media attention at the time and was discussed in a Senate hearing on May 22, 1997.

Women in the Air Force served in the Iraq War from 2003 until 2011.

The Air Force Academy sexual assault scandal in 2003 involved allegations of sexual assault at the Air Force Academy, as well as allegations that the alleged incidents had been ignored by the academy’s leadership.

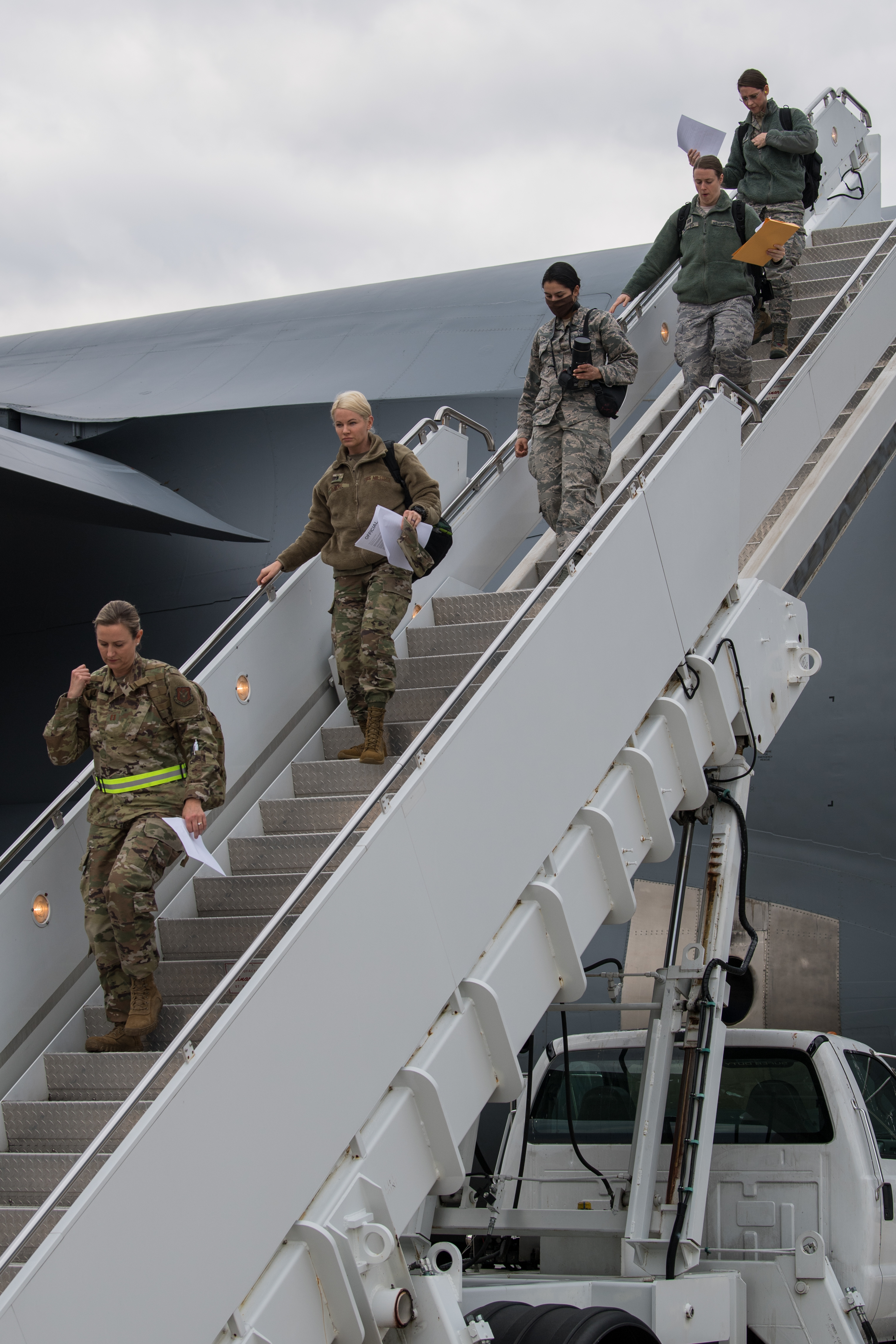
Air Force Reserve medical personnel at Joint Base McGuire–Dix–Lakehurst during the COVID-19 pandemic, April 2020

The United States Air Force Basic Training scandal involved 43 female trainees who alleged being victimized by their Military Training Instructors during and after basic military training starting from 2009. Seventeen male instructors were accused of offenses ranging from seeking improper relationships to rape and 35 instructors were removed from their posts pending investigations. Nine of the accused instructors belonged to the 331st Training Squadron. The commander of the 331st Training Squadron, Lt. Col. Mike Paquette, was removed from command in June 2012 because of the problems in his unit. In August 2012 the commander of the 737th training group, Col. Glenn Palmer, was also relieved from his position due to the scandal.

In 2012 Janet Wolfenbarger became the Air Force's first female four-star general. Before that, there had been women general officers of a lesser rank in the Air Force, including, among others, an African American female physician, Edith Peterson Mitchell, MD, a medical oncologist who became a brigadier general and president of an American medical society.

In 2013 Defense Secretary Leon Panetta removed the military's ban on women serving in combat, overturning the 1994 rule. Panetta's decision gave the military services until January 2016 to seek special exceptions if they believed any positions must remain closed to women. The services had until May 2013 to draw up a plan for opening all units to women and until the end of 2015 to actually implement it.

In December 2015, Defense Secretary Ash Carter stated that starting in 2016 all combat jobs would open to women.

In March 2016, Ash Carter approved final plans from military service branches and the U.S. Special Operations Command to open all combat jobs to women, and authorized the military to begin integrating female combat soldiers "right away."

On August 14, 2020, JoAnne S. Bass became the Chief Master Sergeant of the Air Force, and therefore the first woman to hold the highest senior enlisted rank in any United States military branch, having been selected for the position on June 19.

Also in 2020, Emily Thompson became the first woman to fly the F-35A Lightning II in combat.

Women in the Air Force served in the Afghanistan War that began in 2001 and ended in 2021, and the American-led combat intervention in Iraq that began in 2014 and ended in 2021.

In 2022 a woman whose name was not publicly announced became the Air Force’s first female special tactics officer.

On November 1, 2024, Tiffany Zaloudek became the first woman SERE specialist to earn the rank of chief master sergeant in the Air Force.

On November 12, 2024, Capt. Lacie Hester was awarded the Silver Star for her role in the shootdown of 70 drones and three ballistic missiles launched at Israel, becoming the first woman in the Air Force, and the 10th woman in the U.S. military, to receive the Silver Star.

=== Women in the Air Force after 2025 ===
Women in the Air Force served in the 2026 Iran war. Notably, two women were among the first Air Force fatalities in that war (out of a total of six Air Force members who became the first by dying in a crash), Ashley Pruitt and Ariana G. Savino.

== See also ==
- Women's Air Force (WAF)
- 2003 United States Air Force Academy sexual assault scandal
- United States Air Force Basic Training scandal
