= Mary Shelley (disambiguation) =

Mary Shelley (1797–1851) was an English novelist.

Mary Shelley may also refer to:

- Mary Shelley (film), a 2017 romantic period-drama film
- Mary Shelley (Doctor Who), a fictional version of the English writer
- Mary Michael Shelley (born 1950), American folk artist

== See also ==
- Mary Josephine Shelly (1902–1976), American educational and military administrator
