= Naked Maja (disambiguation) =

The Naked Maja is an 1800 painting by Francisco Goya.

Naked Maja may also refer to:

- Naked Maja (postage stamps), a series of 1930 Spanish postage stamps depicting the painting by Francisco Goya
- The Naked Maja (film), a 1958 film
