= Shellen =

Shellen is a surname. Notable people with the surname include:

- Jason Shellen (born 1973), American internet entrepreneur
- Stephen Shellen (born 1957), Canadian actor

== See also ==
- Shelley (name)
