= Shelly =

Shelly or Shelli may refer to:

== Places ==
- Şelli (or Shelly/Shelli), village in Azerbaijan
- Shelly Bay, a bay in New Zealand
- Shelly Beach (disambiguation)
- Shelly, Minnesota, a small city in the United States
- Shelly Park, a suburb in Auckland, New Zealand
- Shelly, Pennsylvania, United States
- Shelly Township, Norman County, Minnesota

== People ==
- Shelly (model) (born 1984), Japanese model and television presenter
- Shelly Altman, American soap opera writer
- Shelly Bereznyak (born 2000), Israeli tennis player
- Shelly Bobritsky (born 2001), Israeli Olympic swimmer in artistic swimming
- Shelly Bond (née Roeberg), American comic book editor
- Shelly Bradley (born Shelly Banks, 1970), Canadian curler
- Shelly Burch (born 1960), American actress and singer
- Shelly Crow (1948-2011), American nurse and nursing administrator
- Shelly Dadon (died 2014), Israeli murder victim
- Shelly Fairchild (born 1977), American music recording artist
- Shelly Finkel (born 1944), American boxing and music manager and promoter
- Shelly Hutchinson, American politician
- Shelly Kappe (born 1928), American architectural historian
- Shelly Kishore (born 1983), Indian actress
- Shelly Lundberg, American economist
- Shelly Manne (1920–1984), American jazz drummer
- Shelly Martinez (born 1980), American model, actress, retired professional wrestler and valet
- Shelly Miscavige (born 1961), wife of the leader of Church of Scientology
- Shelly Oberoi (born 1983), Indian politician
- Shelly Palmer, American advertising, marketing and technology consultant
- Shelly Poole (born 1972), English songwriter and singer
- Shelly Peiken, American songwriter
- Shelly Peyton, American chemist
- Shelly Saltman (1931–2019), American event promoter
- Shelly Steely Ramirez (born 1962), American long-distance runner
- Shelly Vincent (born 1979), American professional boxer
- Shelly West (born 1958), American country music singer
- Shelly Willingham (born 1943), American politician
- Shelly Woods (born 1986), British Paralympic athlete
- Shelly Yachimovich (born 1960), Israeli politician
- Shelly Yakus (born 1945), American music engineer
- Shelli Yoder (born 1968), American politician
- Shelly Zegart (born 1941), American seamstress

== Fictional characters ==
- Shelly, a family nickname for Sheldon Cooper from the 2007 TV series The Big Bang Theory
- Shelly de Killer, a character in the Ace Attorney franchise
- Shelly Johnson ('Twin Peaks'), a character from the 1990 television show Twin Peaks
- Shelly LaMarine, a character from the 1976 Hanna-Barbera series Jabberjaw
- Shelly Marsh, a character from the 1997 TV series South Park
- Shelly, the starter character in the video game Brawl Stars
- Shelly Sultenfuss, a character from the 1991 and 1994 American coming-of-age comedy-drama movies My Girl and My Girl 2
- Shelly Tambo, a character from the 1990 television show Northern Exposure
- Shelly Webster, a character from the 1994 movie The Crow

== Surname ==
- Adrienne Shelly (1966–2006), American actress, director, and screenwriter
- Ben Shelly (born 1947), a president of the Navajo Nation
- Mary Josephine Shelly (1902-1976), American military administrator
- Pat Shelly, American breastfeeding activist
- Rubel Shelly, author, minister, and former president of Rochester College
- Tony Shelly (1937–1998), racing driver from New Zealand

== Other ==
- MV Shelly, a cargo vessel that sank after a 2007 collision with the Salamis Glory
- Shelly Party (מפלגת שלי), a minor political party in Israel
- Shelly limestone
- Shelly ware, a type of pottery
- 17280 Shelly, a main-belt asteroid

== See also ==
- Shelley (disambiguation)
- Michelle (name)
- Keep Shelly in Athens, a Greek musical duo
