= Shelley =

Shelley most often refers to:

- Mary Shelley (1797–1851), the author of Frankenstein and the wife of Percy Shelley
- Percy Bysshe Shelley (1792–1822), a major English Romantic poet, the husband of Mary Shelley
- Shelley (name), a given name and a surname

Shelley may also refer to:

== Film and television ==
- Shelley (1972 film), a British television film
- Shelley (2016 film), a Danish film
- Shelley (TV series), a British sitcom that first aired in 1979
- Shelley (American Horror Story), a character on American Horror Story

== Music ==
- Shelley (musician) (Shelley Marshaun Massenburg-Smith, born 1988), German-born American musician
- Shelley (band) or Orlando, a British 1990s band
- "Shelley", a song by Dance Hall Crashers, from the 1995 album Lockjaw

== Places ==
- Shelley, Victoria, a former town in the shire of Towong, Australia
  - Shelley railway station, Victoria, a closed station
- Shelley, Western Australia, a suburb of Perth
- Shelley, British Columbia, Canada
- Shelley, Essex, England
- Shelley, Suffolk, England
- Shelley, West Yorkshire, England
  - Shelley railway station
- Shelley, Idaho, U.S.
- Shelley's Laserdome, former nightclub in Stoke-on-Trent, England

== Other uses ==
- Shelley Potteries, a British pottery business
- MV Shelley or Empire Rancher, a ship

== See also ==
- Rule in Shelley's Case, a rule of law about property and trusts in common law jurisdictions
- Shelly (disambiguation)
