= Eolyne Y. Nichols =

American aviator

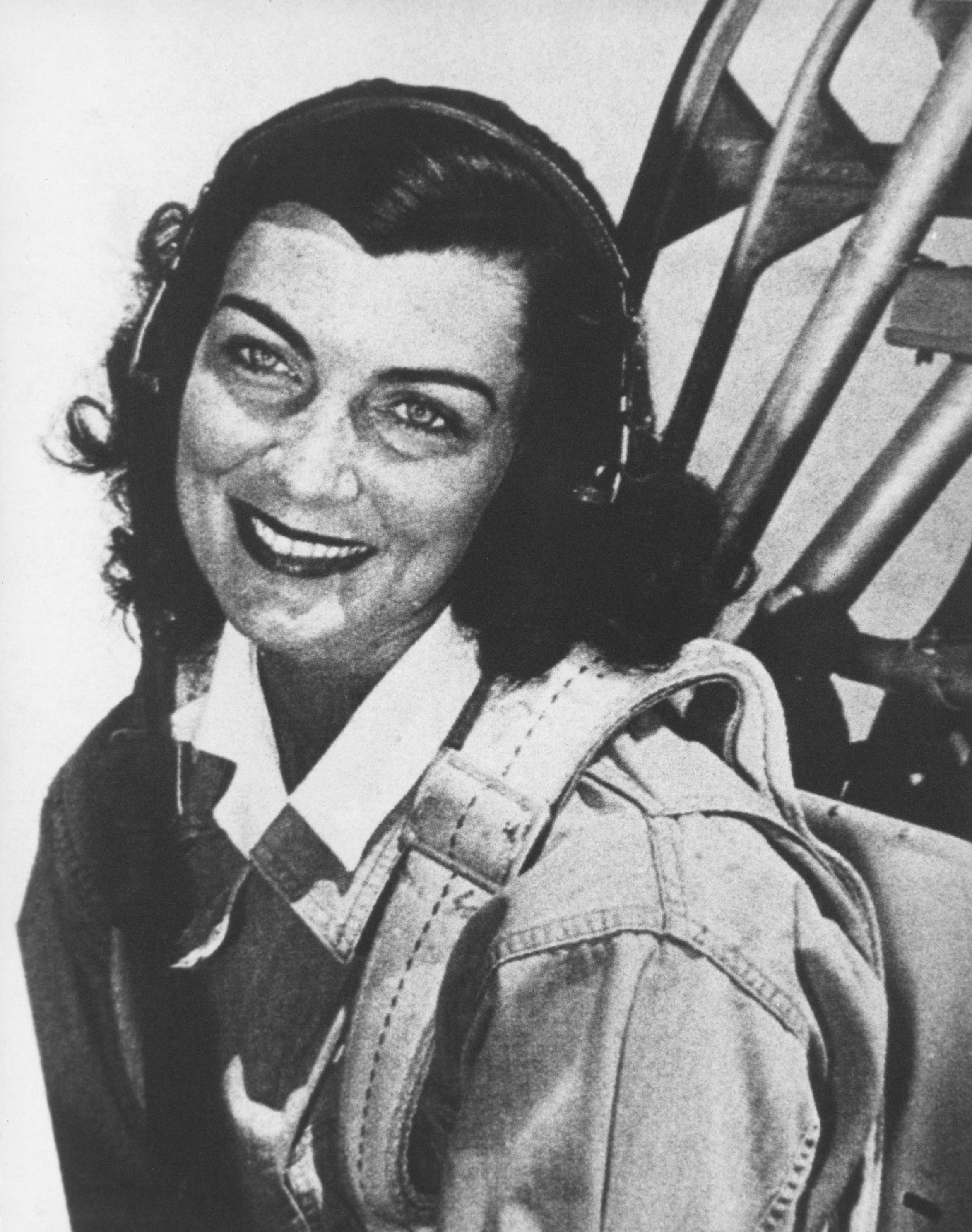
Eolyne Nichols in BT-13 trainer plane

Eolyne Yvette Nichols (1919–2008) was an American pilot and aeronautical engineer. She served in the Women Airforce Service Pilots.

== Early life and training ==
Nichols grew up in Miami. Her father, inventor I.G. Nichols, supported her plans to become an aviator. Nichols went to Lane Mechanical High School, where she was the only female student. She entered the University of Illinois when she was 14 years old, as a student in the Aeronautical Engineering and Civil Engineering College. There, she studied languages, art, and industrial design.

Nichols completed a civil pilot training program in 1940. She trained for her commercial license at Harbican Air College in Chicago.

== Service in WW II ==
During World War II Nichols served first in the Women's Air Force (WAF) program, then the Women Airforce Service Pilots (WASPs). In the WASP, she flew both medium and heavy bombers, and was one of the first five women to fly a B-29. She also flew B-17's, C-54's, and several other models of plane. Nichols's work included towing targets, testing planes, and ferrying radio-controlled aircraft. As an aeronautical engineer, she also worked in classified research at the California Institute of Technology.

By 1946, Nichols had spent 5,500 hours in the air, many of them in South America, where she charted routes for various governments. She flew in Bolivia, Brazil, Peru, and Venezuela.

== Later life ==
Nichols worked on a pilot selection committee for KLM Royal Dutch Airlines, where she was one of three members tasked with hiring 250 Canadian pilots for the company. Nichols also organized the pilots' transportation to Europe. She later became deputy operations manager for Iranian Airways, negotiating routes over European, Asian, and African countries.
