= Shelley Collection =

Collection of philatelic material relating to the Spanish Civil War

The Shelley Collection is a collection of philatelic material relating to the Spanish Civil War that forms part of the British Library Philatelic Collections.

The collection is in five volumes and mainly comprises covers used to and from the International Brigades. It was formed by Ronald G. Shelley and bequeathed to the library in 2003.

== See also ==
- Bailey Collection
- Blackburn Collection
- Postage stamps and postal history of Spain
