= Esther McGowin Blake =

United States Air Force airman

Staff Sergeant Esther McGowin Blake
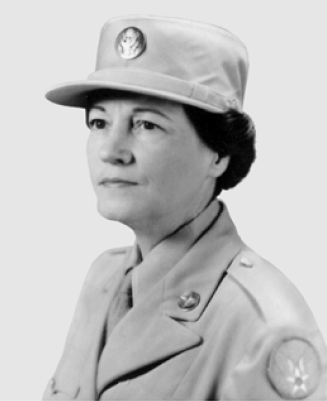
- Born: 1897
- Died: 1979 (aged 81–82)
- Military career
- Allegiance: United States
- Branch: United States Army Air Forces; United States Air Force; Women's Army Corps
- Service years: 1944 - 1954 (10 years)
- Rank: Staff Sergeant
- Nickname: "First Woman in the Air Force"

Esther McGowin Blake (1897–1979) was the first woman in the United States Air Force. She enlisted on the first minute of the first hour of the first day regular U.S. Air Force duty was authorized for women on July 8, 1948.

== Military career ==
Blake's active military career began in 1944 when she, a widow, joined her sons in uniform for the United States Army Air Forces. She closed her desk as a civilian employee at Miami Air Depot and joined the Women's Army Corps when she was notified her oldest son, a B-17 Flying Fortress pilot, had been shot down over Belgium and was reported missing.

Her younger son was quoted as saying that her reason for joining was the hope of helping free a soldier from clerical work to fight, thus speeding the end of the war. During the months and years that followed, Blake saw both of her sons return home from combat with only minor wounds and many decorations.

She remained active with the Air Force until 1954 when she separated due to disability. After separation, she worked as a civil service employee at the Veterans Regional Headquarters in Montgomery, Alabama until her death in 1979.

== See also ==
- Women in the Air Force (WAF)
- Women in the United States Air Force
