= Mary Josephine Shelly =

American military administrator (1902–1976)

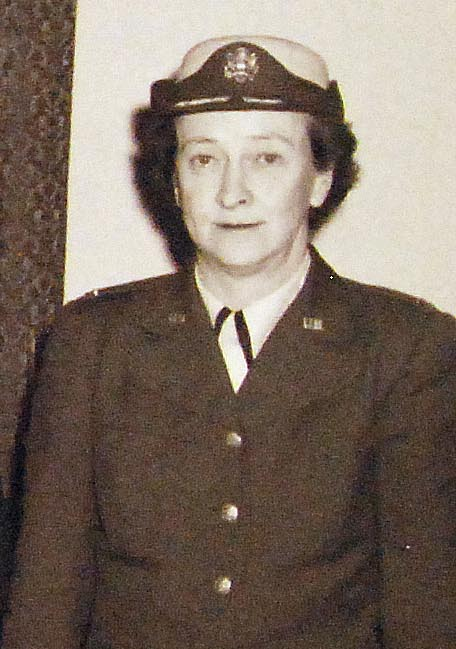
- Shelly in 1952
- Nickname: Mary Jo
- Born: February 17, 1902; Grand Rapids, Michigan, U.S.
- Died: August 5, 1976 (aged 74) New York City, U.S.
- Branch: United States Navy; United States Air Force
- Service years: 1941–1945; 1951–1954
- Rank: Colonel (USAF); Lieutenant (WAVES)
- Conflicts: World War II; Korean War
- Alma mater: University of Oregon; Teacher's College, Columbia University

Mary Josephine Shelly (February 17, 1902 – August 5, 1976) was an American educational and military administrator who led the United States Navy's education for WAVES in World War II. She later served as director of the Women's Air Force in the Korean War.

== Early life and career ==
Mary Josephine "Mary Jo" Shelly was born to Irish-American parents on February 17, 1902, the youngest of four children, in Grand Rapids, Michigan. In 1919, Shelly joined John Harvey Kellogg's Battle Creek School of Physical Education, graduating in spring 1922. There she met Martha Hill, who remained a close friend and colleague throughout her life. Several suspected a romantic component throughout their early relationship.

From 1923 to 1924, Shelly taught at the Battle Creek Normal School. Shelly attended the University of Oregon, starting to teach physical education there in 1924 and earning her bachelor's degree in 1926. She returned to the University of Oregon to teach. She later obtained her master's degree from Teachers College, Columbia University. While there, she, with fellow Kellogg graduates Martha Hill and Edith Ballweber, enrolled in Gertrude Colby's program in the physical education requirement. In fall of 1929, she joined the faculty of Teacher's College. In 1932, Shelly was one of ten full-time professors hired at Columbia's New College, an experimental school within Teacher's College, where she supervised courses on the study of communications and global studies.

In 1933, Shelly was invited to teach dance and develop a summer dance institute with Hill. The next summer, the Bennington School of Dance opened as an "immediate success", with Shelly as the administrative director, dealing with "catastrophes" as they arose. Notably, the program hosted Martha Graham, Doris Humphrey, Charles Weidman, Hanya Holm, and Jóse Limón. The rigorous program became "an important hub for modern dance", and was particularly notable for teaching many techniques and approaches to modern dance with a focus on artistry. Shelly returned in this position in summers until 1941.

In 1935, Shelly was appointed to associate professor of physical education and assistant to the dean of students at the University of Chicago. While there, she became assistant to the dean of students and chaired the women's physical education department, directing the Ida Noyes Gymnasium. She brought her interest in dance into physical education. Shelly continued to spend her summers in Bennington, helping Hill with the summer program. In 1939, Shelly helped Hill move the Bennington summer dance program to Mills College at Northeastern University under Rosalind Cassidy and Aurelia Henry Reinhardt.

In 1938, Shelly joined Bennington College as the educational assistant to university President Robert Devore Leigh. In 1940, she also became the administrative director of the school of the arts.

== Military career ==
In April 1942, Shelly took stock of Bennington's "resources for the national service" for the war. Shelly was contacted by Gene Tunney, who was in charge of training men in the Navy, asking her to take over for women. Though she initially refused, when he visited Bennington in person, she agreed. In September 1942, Shelly temporarily left Bennington College to join the Women's Naval Reserve as a lieutenant in charge of physical training and drill. She was one of the first lieutenants commissioned in WAVES. She was quickly promoted to Assistant for the Women's Reserve to the Director of Training of the Navy, Mildred H. McAfee. In this position, she led the WAVES schools to expand from just one to thirty-two. At the end of the war, she planned and oversaw the demobilization of 82,000 WAVES. Secretary of the Navy James Forrestal awarded her a Secretarial Citation in honor of her service.

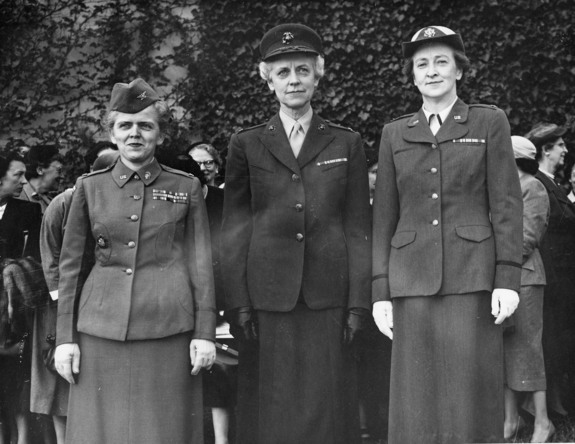
Photo from 1951 of the Heads of three of the women's services watching their units pass in review at the river entrance of the Pentagon. Shelly is on the right.

Shelly returned to Bennington after the war as the college's director of admissions, and reverted to the Military reserve as a commander. In the public view, "many strong women were assumed to be lesbians, and Mary Jo was proudly one of them." In 1948, Shelly, now romantically involved with a fellow WAVE, purchased a summer cottage in Block Island.

During the Korean War, the United States was working to increase the recruitment of women in the Air Force. In 1951, Shelly met with Assistant Secretary of the Defense Anna Rosenberg, Secretary of the Air Force Thomas K. Finletter, and Air Force Chief of Staff Hoyt Vandenberg, who asked her to take Geraldine Pratt May's position of director of the Women's Air Force (WAF). Though she was initially hesitant, she ultimately agreed, and joined the Air Force as a colonel.

Shelly inherited the problems that May had struggled with, including problems with women's uniforms, which were not constructed to fit the women, and substandard housing. She also faced low morale due to civilian women doing the same jobs, but in more attractive clothing and less restrictive positions. The WAF also struggled with a low education rate, with 29% of recruits lacking a high school diploma, and a high attrition rate. In 1952, Jeanne M. Holm reported to Shelly that the WAF was in danger of shrinking until it disappeared. In response to this, Shelly worked to make the WAF more elite, dropping quotas and raising the minimum Armed Forces Qualification Test score. Following this change, though fewer women were recruited, they outperformed men in several areas. Although the number of women in administration shrunk, nearly twice as many women were growing in high-tech communications.

In 1953, Shelly returned to Bennington as director of personnel. In January 1954, she resigned from the Air Force. That same year, she began working for the Girl Scouts of the USA as their public relations director. She retired in 1966.

== Later life and death ==
In 1967, Shelly and Hill began writing a book about Bennington. While the book was unpublished, Shelly's writings were widely referenced in accounts of the Bennington School of Dance.

On August 2, 1976, Shelly was suddenly hospitalized and on August 5, died at New York Hospital.
