= Bailey Collection =

The Bailey Collection is a collection of philatelic material relating to the Spanish Civil War that forms part of the British Library Philatelic Collections. The collection was donated to the Library by the Spanish Study Circle in 2007.

== See also ==
- Blackburn Collection
- Postage stamps and postal history of Spain
- Shelley Collection
