= MaryBelle Johns Nissly =

MaryBelle Johns Nissly (May 1, 1918 – July 30, 1999) was an American conductor and music educator.

A native of Lancaster, Pennsylvania, Nissly attended Lititz High School, where she was the first female drum major in the student body. She received her degree in music education from West Chester State Teachers College in 1937, and became the supervisor of music for Lancaster Township Schools. She played piccolo and flute in the WAC Band of the 400th Women's Army Corps at Fort Des Moines during World War II; she became the group's conductor before being sent for training at the Army Music School at Fort Myer, where she studied to become an Army Band Leader. Upon completion of her courses she was assigned first to the 400th WAC Band and then to the 401st. In 1944 she received the rank of warrant officer, the first woman in the United States military to achieve the position. Her work also garnered her the Army Commendation Ribbon. After the war she attended the University of Pennsylvania, receiving her master's degree in 1949. Until 1951 she taught instrumental music in Manheim Township Schools in Neffsville, Pennsylvania; in the later year she was commissioned a captain in the United States Air Force, organizing and leading the Women's Air Force Band, which she continued to conduct throughout its existence. She remained in the Air Force until 1968, achieving the rank of major. She continued teaching music, with her last position being at the University of Arkansas at Little Rock. Nissly suffered from Alzheimer's disease for some years before her death.

In 2018 Manheim Township School District honored Marybelle Nissley by establishing the Marybelle Johns Nissley Women in Leadership Club and the Marybelle Johns Nissley Women in Leadership Fund. Under the leadership of Natalie E. Miller, a Junior student at the school, the Club and Fund partnered with the Women's Air Force Alumni Band and the Lancaster Community to hold the school's first annual Women in Leadership Conference (in 2019) with five guest speakers from across the Lancaster area and from Illinois, with over 300 students in attendance. During the conference the club announced its first annual Women in Leadership Scholarship, provided at graduation later that year. The club continues its annual conference and scholarship to this day (2023).
