= Elizabeth Ann Ray =

- Born: May 31, 1913
- Died: December 7, 2011 (aged 98)
- Military career
- Branch: United States Army; United States Air Force

Elizabeth Nona Ray (May 31, 1913 – December 7, 2011) was a career officer in the United States Army and United States Air Force, most notably serving as director of Women in the Air Force (WAF) from 1961 to 1965.

== Biography ==
Ray was born in 1913 in Winnsboro, Texas, and was raised primarily in Oklahoma. She moved frequently around the state due to her father's job in the newspaper business. She graduated from high school in Mangum, Oklahoma and attended Oklahoma College for Women for a year. In 1934 she earned a journalism degree from the University of Oklahoma. After graduation, Ray worked for a newspaper in Anadarko, Oklahoma. She was later recruited by the War Department, where she served in the Public Relations Bureau.

In 1942, Ray joined the Women's Army Auxiliary Corps (later the Women's Army Corps) and completed Officer Training School at Fort Des Moines, Iowa. She had brief assignments at the training center at Daytona Beach and at the WAAC Headquarters in the Pentagon before being transferred overseas in June 1943. Ray was stationed at the headquarters of Dwight D. Eisenhower in Algiers, Algeria. In January 1944, she was appointed commander of a WAC intelligence squadron at 15th Air Force Headquarters in Bari, Italy. She returned to the U.S. in late 1945 and was assigned to the inactive reserve.

On May 10, 1949, Ray was reactivated in the Women in the Air Force (WAF) and sent to Mitchel Field, New York, where she commanded female troops then worked in personnel and public relations. In 1950, she also attended Armed Forces Informational School at Carlisle Barracks. From 1953 to 1955, Ray served as deputy director of WAF.

From 1955 to 1958, Ray was assigned to DACOWITS as executive secretary for the advisory committee. She then became chief of the promotion and augmentation/selection records branch of Strategic Air Command at Offutt Air Force Base, Nebraska. In September 1961, Ray was appointed director of WAF and served in this capacity until her retirement in 1965.
