= Air Command and Staff College =

Coordinates: 32.384°N 86.344°W

Air Command and Staff College
- Active: 1931–present
- Country: United States
- Branch: United States Air Force
- Role: Professional Military Education
- Part of: Air University; Air Education and Training Command
- Garrison/HQ: Maxwell Air Force Base, Montgomery, Alabama, U.S.

The Air Command and Staff College (ACSC) is located at Maxwell Air Force Base in Montgomery, Alabama, and is the United States Air Force's intermediate-level professional military education (PME) school. It is a subordinate command of Air University (AU), also located at Maxwell AFB, and is part of the Air Education and Training Command (AETC) headquartered at Randolph Air Force Base, Texas.

The Distance Learning version of ACSC is conducted by the Air Force Global College (AFGC) - College of Online Professional Military Education (COOL PME), a separate school within Air University. It has different curriculum and admission eligibility than the in-residence version.

ACSC prepares field grade or equivalent level commissioned officers of all U.S. military services in pay grade O-4 (e.g., majors in the U.S. Air Force, U.S. Army and U.S. Marine Corps and lieutenant commanders in the U.S. Navy and U.S. Coast Guard, as well as major-selectees and lieutenant commander-selectees), equivalent rank international military officers, and U.S. Department of Defense and Department of the Air Force civil servants of at least GS-12/GM-12 level, to assume positions of higher responsibility within the military and other government organizations.

Successful completion of ACSC or an equivalent command and staff college of another service (e.g., United States Army Command & General Staff College; College of Naval Command and Staff curriculum of the U.S. Naval War College) is considered a de facto requirement for all majors in the U.S. Air Force (to include Air Force Reserve and Air National Guard) to promote to lieutenant colonel.

Eligible senior members of the Civil Air Patrol (CAP), the civilian U.S. Air Force Auxiliary, who hold the rank of major or above are entitled to attend ACSC. The curriculum is accessed by CAP student officers through the ACSC distance learning platform.

ACSC is geared toward teaching the skills necessary for air and space operations in support of a joint campaign, as well as leadership and command at the USAF squadron level or its equivalent in the other services. The school awards a Master of Military Operational Art and Science professional degree to students who complete the program's requirements.

== Mission ==
Prepare warriors to lead air, space and cyberspace forces in joint/combined operations

== Organization ==
The Deans provide academic leadership to the school's faculty and student body. The dean of education and curriculum, assisted by the vice dean for academic affairs and vice dean for operations, coordinates the integration of the final curriculum content and directs the planning and implementation of the academic programs. The dean of services and support leads the efforts of cross-cutting organizations including personnel, fitness, technology, facilities, and security. The commanders and staff of the 21st Student Squadron and the 38th Student Squadron are responsible for the health, morale, and welfare of 500 resident students and their families.

== Curriculum ==
The present 10-month curriculum focuses on expanding understanding of air and space power and on the growth of mid-career officers. It is meant to:

- facilitate the air and space minded thinking of students
- develop and enhance abilities for higher-level command and staff responsibilities,
- enhance students' abilities to think critically about operational air and space concepts in a dynamic international environment,
- broaden students' understanding of the nature of conflict and current and future threats to the United States and its allies, and
- develop and enhance students' abilities to plan and execute the joint campaign planning process and air and space operations to support the joint force commander.

There are currently five curriculum departments at the ACSC:

- International Security and Military Studies
- Joint Warfare Studies
- Leadership, Command and Communication Studies
- Airpower Studies
- Specialized Studies

=== Master of Military Operational Art and Science ===
The Air Command and Staff College awards a Master of Military Operational Art and Science (M.M.O.A.S) professional degree in connection with the Air University to students who complete the program's requirements. The college offers the MMOAS degree via its traditional 10-month in-residence program or a self-paced online program The School of Advanced Military Studies of the United States Army Command and General Staff College awards a similar professional degree, the Masters of Military Art and Science. Upon completing the ACSC program, MMOAS graduates are awarded "Intermediate Developmental Education" (IDE) and Joint Professional Military Education phase 1 (JPME1) credit in the United States Air Force.

The MMOAS degree requires study in many academic disciplines related to war, peace, and the employment of military forces. They include established academic fields of study such as sociology, history, engineering, psychology, politics, geography, science, ethics, economics, anthropology, and others. It may also include other professional fields of practice such as medicine and the law insofar as they interact with the military or are applied to military matters. It provides intellectual and theoretical depth to the military profession and its practitioners. Thus, a large proportion of research in the field of military art and science is done to address practical problems faced by practitioners. Purely academic research, however, is also an integral part of the field and is essential to ensure its continued intellectual vitality. The results of scholarship and research in the field may be of interest and may be helpful to political leaders and policymakers, military officers, as well as to scholars and the interested public.

Military art generally deals with the human dimensions of war and military operations. Military art is generally subject to qualitative rather than quantitative investigation, although it does not exclude the use of quantitative methods when appropriate. It includes such areas as psychology, leadership, individual and collective behavior, culture, ethics, and problem-solving. History provides the context and depth for the study of military art. Military art also includes such specifically military subjects as strategy, operational art, and tactics. Military science generally deals with the technical dimensions of war and military operations. Military science is generally subject to quantitative rather than qualitative investigation, although qualitative methodologies are used when appropriate. It includes such areas as the technological military applications and equipment made possible by the physical sciences, various engineering disciplines, industrial management, logistics, electronic simulations, communications technologies, and transportation technologies. Mathematics is an important tool in the practice of military science and associated disciplines. Specific military applications include gunnery and ballistics, materials science technology for soldier protection, transportation technologies, and communications technologies. The interdisciplinary field of military art and science may be pictured as a "big umbrella" which encompasses other academic disciplines and fields of professional practice.

== Facilities ==
ACSC is located in Spaatz Hall on Chennault Circle at Maxwell Air Force Base, Alabama. The building contains a 600-seat auditorium for lectures by distinguished speakers, a smaller 135-seat auditorium for special presentations, plus a variety of conference rooms, staff and administrative offices, and lounge areas. Seminar sessions are held in specially designed rooms featuring closed-circuit television, an array of multimedia equipment, and student access to a school-wide computer network and the Internet. Students are issued more than 80 books to expand their professional capabilities and a personal laptop computer to use to keep track of the academic schedules, on-line reading assignments, and for use in examinations throughout the academic year.

== History ==
The Air Command & Staff College traces its roots to the Air Corps Tactical School (ACTS) located at Langley Field, Virginia, from 1926 to 1931, and Maxwell Field from 1931 to 1946. After World War II, with the establishment of an independent U.S. Air Force in 1947, and as the service grew and developed, the requirements and expectations of the renamed Air Command and Staff School evolved to fulfill the service's educational needs.

In 1952, Major Jeanne M. Holm became the first woman to attend the Air Command and Staff School. She was later the first female USAF officer to achieve the rank of brigadier general and later major general.

In 1962, the school became known by its current name, Air Command and Staff College.

During academic year 1994, the school undertook the most significant change to its educational program since its inception. The school transitioned from a lecture-based to a seminar-centered, active environment with an integrated curriculum geared to problem solving across the continuum from peace to war. In academic year 1999, the school began efforts to align its curriculum under the Air University commander's Strategic Guidance for the Continuum of Education. That program now functions as a portion of a comprehensive and integrated career-long professional military education program.

== See also ==
- United States Army Command and General Staff College
- Staff (military)
- Military Academy
- United States military academies
- List of defunct United States military academies
- Higher Command and Staff Course (UK)
