= Blackburn Collection =

The Blackburn Collection is a collection of philatelic material relating to the Spanish Civil War that forms part of the British Library Philatelic Collections. The collection also includes 17th century letters from Kings Philip II, III and IV of Spain and correspondence delivered by the Message Carriers of Cadiz. It was donated to the Library by Tony Blackburn and is in 35 volumes.

== See also ==
- Bailey Collection
- Postage stamps and postal history of Spain
- Shelley Collection
