= John Shelley =

John Shelley may refer to:

- John Shelley (illustrator) (born 1959), British illustrator
- John Shelley (MP) for Rye
- John F. Shelley (1905–1974), US politician
- John L. Shelley, Ace Books author
- Sir John Shelley, 1st Baronet
- Sir John Shelley, 4th Baronet (1692–1771), British politician
- Sir John Shelley, 5th Baronet (1730–1783), British politician
- Sir John Shelley, 6th Baronet (1771–1852), English landowner, politician and amateur cricketer
- Sir John Shelley, 7th Baronet (1808–1867), English landowner and politician
