= Postage stamps and postal history of Spain =

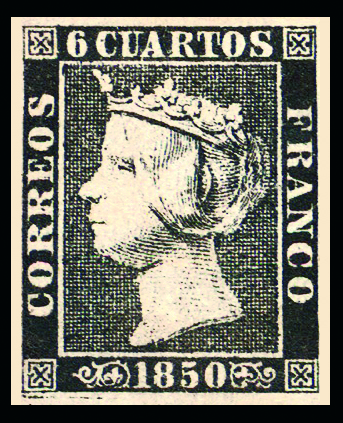
One of the first stamps of Spain, issued 1850

This is a survey of the postage stamps and postal history of Spain.

A royal decree of 12 September 1861 established the Fábrica del Sello as the exclusive printer of Spanish stamps. In 1893 the Fábrica del Sello merged with the Casa de la Moneda to form the La Fábrica Nacional de Moneda y Timbre (FNMT) which has printed the stamps of Spain and its dependencies ever since, except during the Third Carlist War and the Spanish Civil War when concurrent issues were authorized by competing sides. Beginning in the 1950s the printer's initials, "F.N.M.T.", began to appear at the bottom of some stamps. Since 1977, the year of issue has appeared on Spanish stamps.

Stamps in Spain are distributed and sold by the Spanish postal service known as the Correos y Telégrafos, and beginning in 2001 officially a governmental corporation, the Sociedad Estatal de Correos y Telégrafos, S.A., S.M.E. Since 2011 the corporation and its subsidiaries are known as the "Grupo Correos".

== Geographical and historical context ==
Spain is located in southwestern Europe on the Iberian Peninsula. Its mainland is bordered to the south and east by the Mediterranean Sea except for a small land boundary with Gibraltar; to the north by France, Cantabric Sea, and to the northwest and west by the Atlantic Ocean and Portugal.

Spain was a monarchy established by Queen Isabella and King Fernando in the union of the Kingdom of Castile with the Kingdom of Aragon. Their marriage was in 1469. Spanish forces completed the reconquest in 1492, and Jews were expelled by the Alhambra Decree that same year. In 1713, France won War of the Spanish Succession and the Bourbon monarchy was established in Spain. Napoleon occupied Spain from 1808 to 1814. The "war of independence" against France was followed by the Carlist Wars, during which the First Spanish Republic briefly held sway until the restoration of the Bourbons in 1874. Spain remained a monarchy until 1931, when the Second Spanish Republic was established. Communists, socialists, statists and royalists fought the Spanish Civil War from 1936 to 1939, after which the Spanish State of Generalisimo Francisco Franco was generally recognized. The monarchy was restored in 1975 with the ascension of Juan Carlos as king.

Until 1866, the currency was the real which equaled 8 cuartos or 32 maravedis. That year the escudo was introduced, equalling 100 centimos or 1000 milesimas.

== Early postal history ==
Both Castile and Aragon had royal posts during the Middle Ages, and various monasteries and guilds had posts for their members, but Spain's postal system really developed from the contract that Philip I of Castile let to Thurn und Taxis in 1500. That contract gave Thurn und Taxis a monopoly over postal services in the kingdom, thus incommoding the existing entrenched, albeit piecemeal, systems. New route were set up and both naval and merchants ships were required to carry the mail. The system became comprehensive. By 1849 there were about 450 post offices in Spain.

In May 1514, Joanna of Castile appointed the first postmaster for the Indies (Spanish holdings in the New World). But it was not until 8 August 1764, when a royal decree established the "Correo Maritimo de Espana y sus Indias Occidentales" (Maritime Mail of Spain and the Spanish West Indies), with its headquarters in Madrid and offices in major Spanish cites as well as in Havana, Buenos Aires, and Montevideo, that the system spread throughout the Spanish Empire.

== First stamps ==
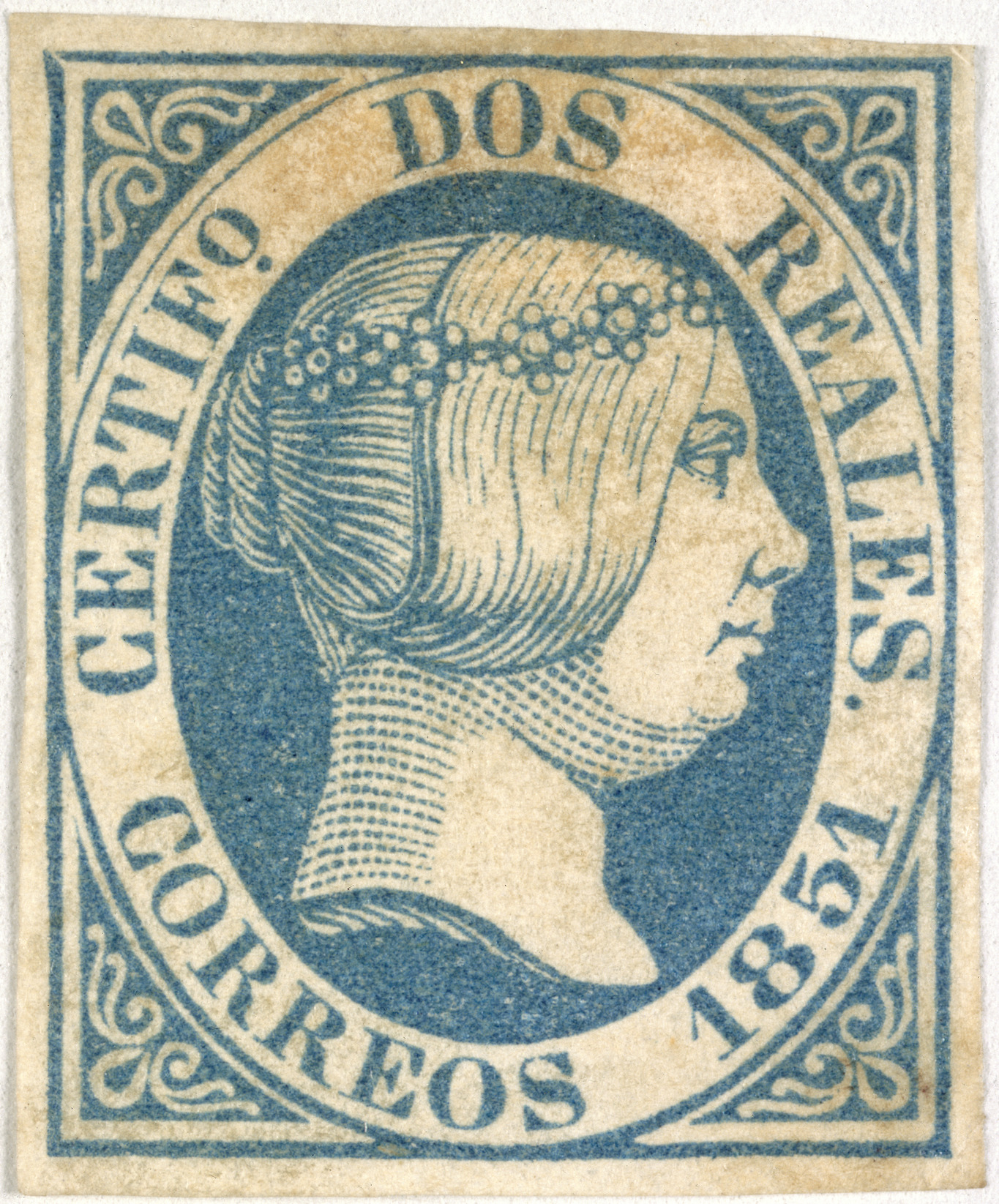
1851 Dos reales stamp, printed in blue instead of red. One of only three examples known. (The Tapling Collection)

In 1843, the Spanish provisional government under General Narváez began to study the British experiment of prepaid postage labels. Finding the British printers Perkins, Bacon and Petch too pricey, they decided to establish their own printer, and on 24 October 1849 Queen Isabella II decreed that Spain would use postage stamps effective 1 January 1850. In December postage rates and regulations were promulgated and the first stamps of Spain were issued on 1 January 1850. There were five stamps in the set with denominations from six cuartos to ten reales in different colors with all of them depicting Queen Isabella II. They were printed lithographically and issued imperforate. Both thin and thick papers were used, but neither had any watermark.

The 1850 stamps were replaced on 1 January 1851 with a new set of six stamps which added the two reales denomination in red, and changed the five reales from red to rose in color. These 1851 stamps had a new portrait of Queen Isabella II, were typographed on thin paper, again without watermark, and issued imperforate.

== 1868 provisionals ==
On 30 September 1868, following the Glorious Revolution which removed Queen Isabella II from the throne, a Provisional Government was formed in Spain pending the election and inauguration of a new king. Isabella II stamps were separately overprinted for use in Madrid, Andalusia, Valladolid, Asturias, Salamanca, and Teruel. These were followed by stamps marking the regency of Marshal Francisco Serrano, 1st Duke of la Torre. They depicted a stylized "España", known as La Matrona, where a woman's head represented the motherland.

In 1872 royal heads briefly reappeared on Spanish stamps with King Amadeo, but were followed by the issues of the First Republic with a seated La Matrona.

== Regional costumes issues ==
From 1967 through 1971, Spain issued a series of stamps that portrayed regional costumes from throughout Spain. Altogether, fifty-three such stamps were issued, at the rate of twelve per year, until the last year, when in 1971 only five such stamps were issued. The first stamp in the series showed a traditional woman's costume of the Basque province of Álava.

== See also ==
- Bailey Collection
- Blackburn Collection
- Shelley Collection
- Tapling Collection
- La maja desnuda (stamps of Spain)
