= Jim Shelley =

Jim Shelley may refer to:

- Jim Shelley (musician) (born 1952), American singer-songwriter
- Jim Shelley (TV critic), British television critic
