= Shelly Beach =

Shelly Beach can refer to:

Australia

- Shelly Beach, Central Coast New South Wales, on the Central Coast of New South Wales, Australia
- Shelly Beach (Manly), in Sydney, New South Wales, Australia
- Shelly Beach (Cronulla), in Sydney, New South Wales, Australia
- Shelly Beach, Queensland (Sunshine Coast), on the Sunshine Coast of Queensland, Australia
- Shelly Beach, Queensland (Townsville), a suburb in the City of Townsville, Queensland, Australia

New Zealand

- Shelly Beach, New Zealand, a settlement in the Auckland Region

South Africa

- Shelly Beach, KwaZulu-Natal, a town on the KwaZulu-Natal South Coast, South Africa
