= Michael Shelley =

Michael Shelley may refer to:

- Michael Shelley (runner) (born 1983), Australian marathon runner and Commonwealth Games medallist
- Michael Shelley (musician), New York-based musician
- Michael Shelley (mathematician) (born 1959), American applied mathematician at the Courant Institute of Mathematical Sciences, New York University
- Mike Sheley, winner of the 1974 4 × 880 yard relay at the NCAA Division I Indoor Track and Field Championships

== See also ==
- Michael Schelle, pronounced Shelley, composer
- Mike Shelley (born 1972), rugby union player
- Michael Shelly (Irish politician)
