= Women's Air Force =

Aspect of the US Air Force

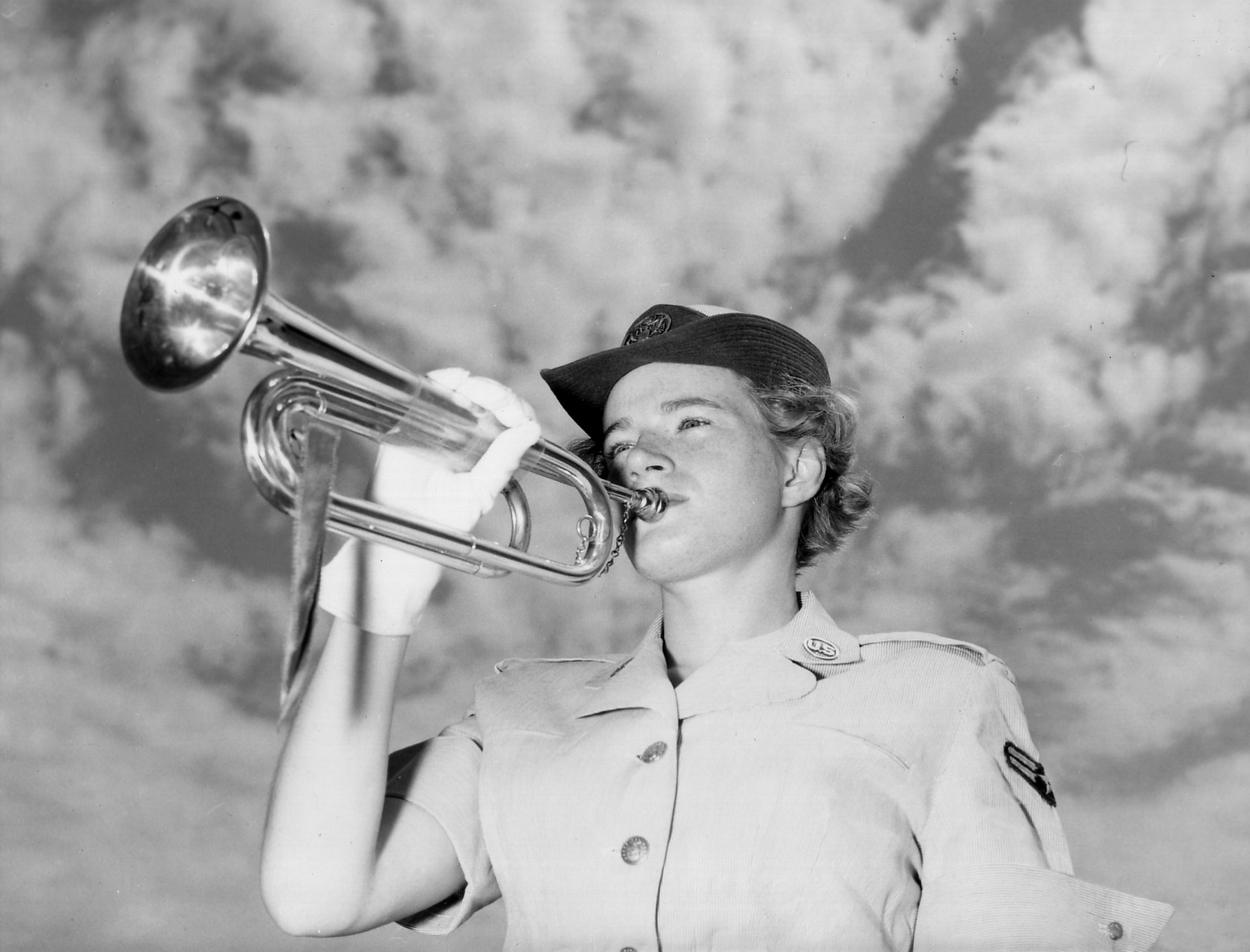
A/2C Frances E. Courtney furnished the bugle calls of taps and reveille for the 3452nd Student Squadron (WAF) at Francis E. Warren Air Force Base in 1953

The Women's Air Force (WAF) was a program which served to bring women into limited roles in the United States Air Force. WAF was formed in 1948 when President Truman signed the Women's Armed Services Integration Act, allowing women to serve directly in the military. The WAF program ended in 1976 when women were accepted into the USAF on an equal basis with men.

WAF was distinct from the Women's Auxiliary Ferrying Squadron (WAFS), a small group of female civilian transport pilots that was formed in 1942 with Nancy H. Love as commander. WAFS was folded into the Women Airforce Service Pilots (WASPs) in 1943; WASP was disbanded in December 1944.

== Life in the WAF ==
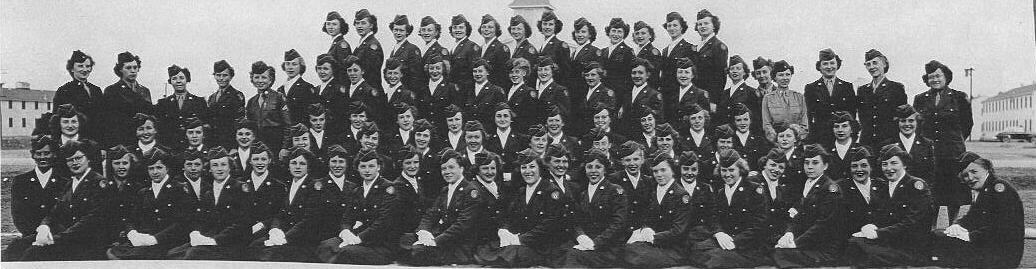
The first WAF squadron at Lackland AFB in 1948

When the USAF was officially formed in 1947, a number of former Women's Army Corps members (WACs) continued serving in the Army but performed Air Force duties, as the Air Force did not admit women in its first year. Some WACs chose to transfer to the WAFs when it became possible.

At its inception in 1948, WAF was limited to 4,000 enlisted women and 300 female officers. Women were encouraged to fill many different roles but were not to be trained as pilots, even though the United States Army Air Corps had graduated their first class of female pilots in April 1943 under wartime conditions. The WAF directorship was to be filled by a non-pilot. All WAFs were assigned ground duties, most ending up in clerical and medical positions.

Women who were already pilots and who would have been good candidates for WAF leadership were instead diverted to the Air Force Reserves. For example, Nancy Harkness Love, founder and commander of the Women's Auxiliary Ferrying Squadron (WAFS) and executive of the Women Airforce Service Pilots (WASPs), was awarded the rank of lieutenant colonel in the Reserves in 1948 after it was directed to admit women. Jacqueline Cochran, who had volunteered in the RAF and had demonstrated solid leadership in greatly expanding the WASP program, was similarly directed to join the Reserves in 1948 within which she rose to the rank of lieutenant colonel in 1969. Female pilots in the Reserves were classified as federal civilian employees, not active military personnel.

=== Directors ===
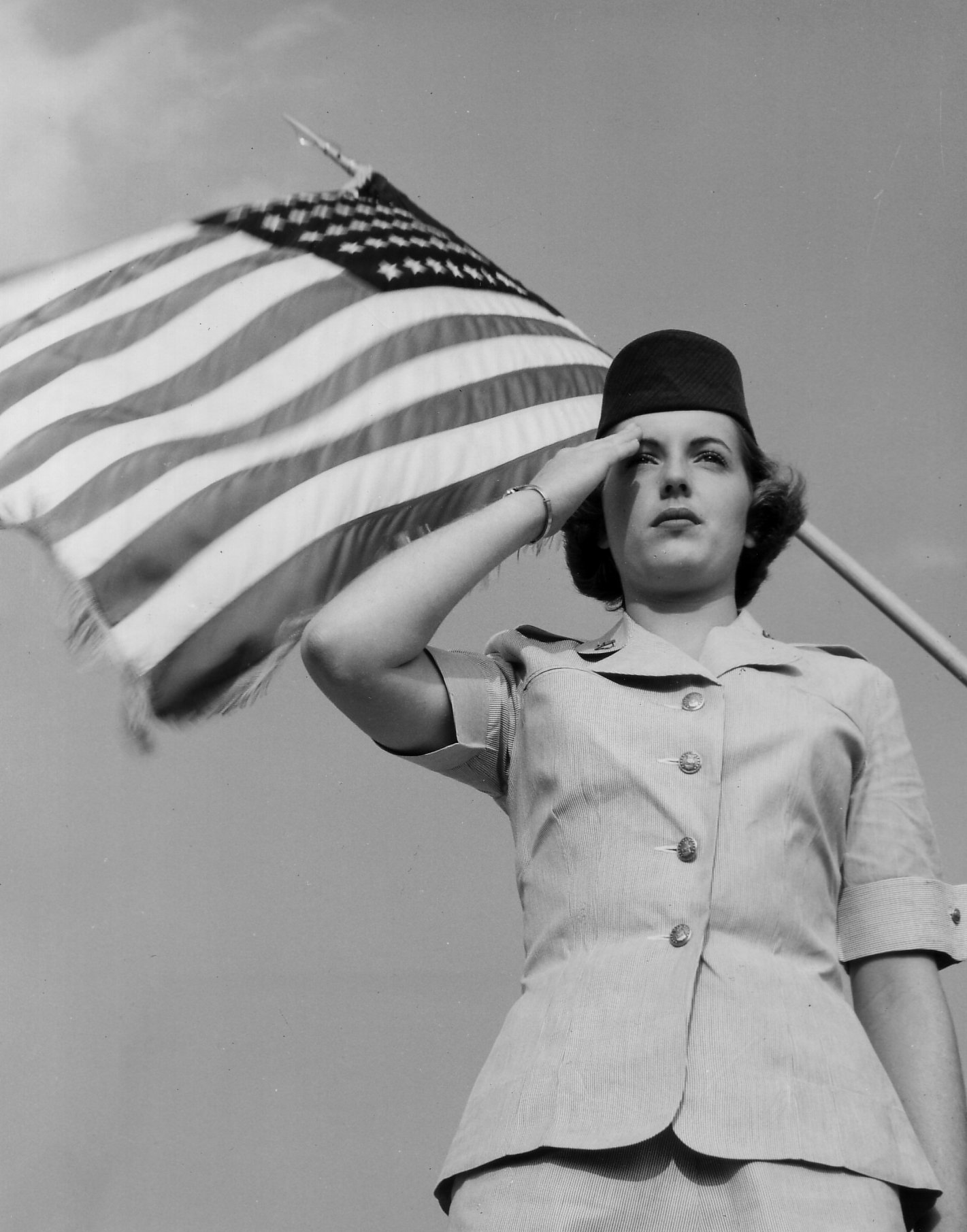
A 1952 WAF officer candidate salutes in front of the American flag

The first director of WAF was Colonel Geraldine Pratt May, who received her first commission in August 1942. She had been among the first women officers assigned to the Army Air Forces, where she served as WAC staff director within Air Transport Command. May's wartime command at "Air WAC" included 6,000 enlisted women and officers. On becoming director of WAF, May was promoted to full colonel, the first woman in the Air Force to attain that rank. May served until 1951 at which time she accepted a non-military government post.

Mary Jo Shelly picked up the WAF directorship in 1951. Shelly was among the first women officers in the Navy and had been instrumental in setting up WAVES training in 1942; after the war she had returned to civilian life as assistant to the president of Bennington College. In WAF, Shelly worked to expand women's assignments within the USAF, as most women were still being placed in traditional "women's jobs" such as stenographer or nurse. A push to employ women in more technical fields was undertaken. Some male USAF commanders were interested in the good results obtained by using women in air defense control centers, passenger air transport operations and in data processing and analysis. Others wanted to see women restricted to a few tightly defined roles. Against the ingrained male-dominated military habits, Shelly achieved only limited success; her outgoing report in 1954 stated that the WAF was fated to remain small and exclusive as long as Selective Service applied only to men.

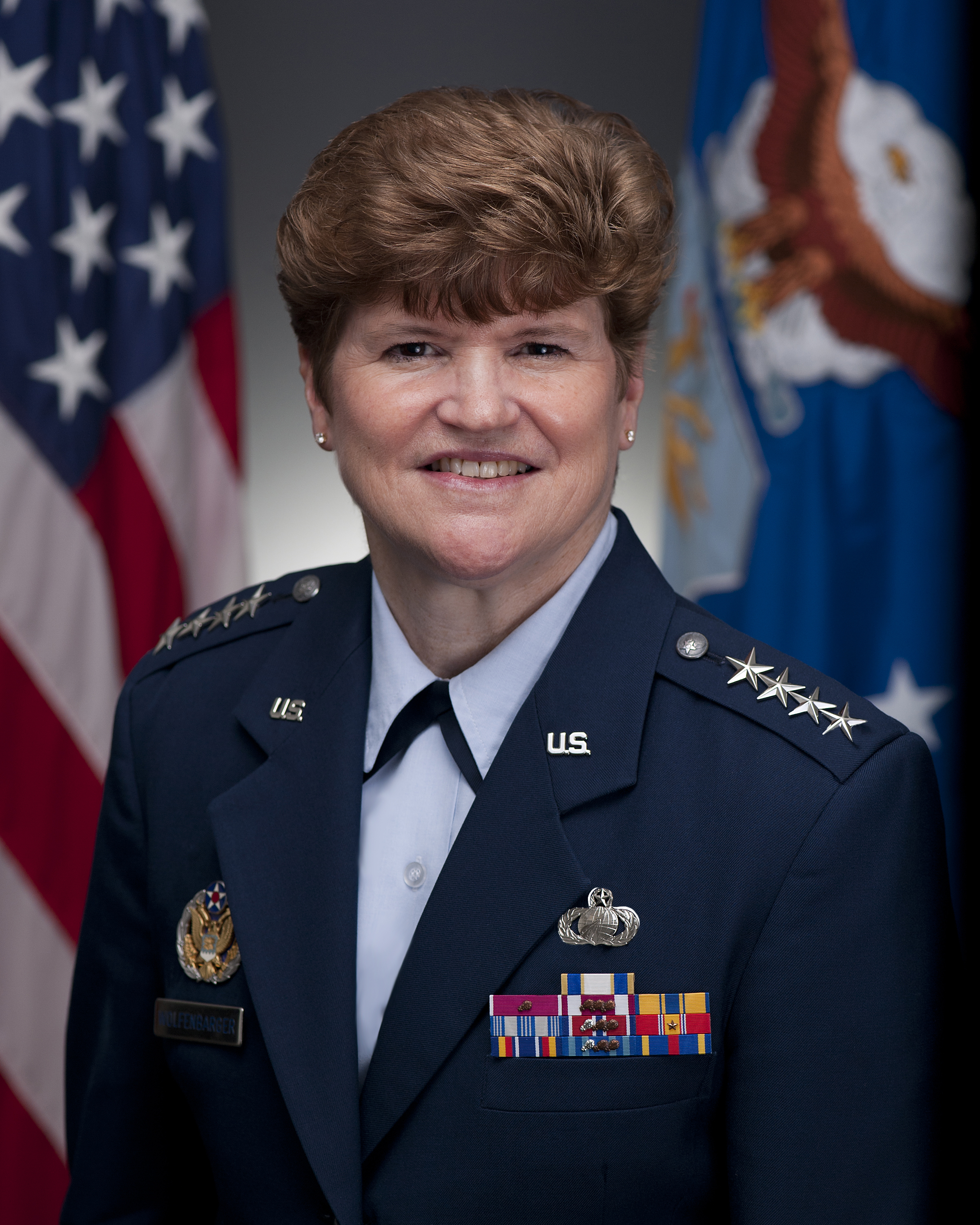
General Janet C. Wolfenbarger is the highest-ranking woman in the USAF.

Colonel Phyllis D. S. Gray, another ex-WAVE, was director of WAF starting in 1954. She passed the baton to Colonel Emma J. Riley in 1957. Riley linked forces with Army Colonel Mary Louise Milligan (WAC) to work with the Defense Department Advisory Committee on Women in the Services (DACOWITS) in a successful attempt to retroactively grant active military service status (and its benefits) to former WAACs (Women's Army Auxiliary Corps) who had served in World War II and had also been in WAC, WAF or one of the other women's services. Riley pointed out to a Congressional subcommittee that SPARS, WAVES and female Marines had been given active duty status but Army and Air Force women had not. The bill passed in 1959 and approximately 1,400 women gained additional active duty credit. WAACs who had chosen not to continue service would wait until 1980 to be granted this status.

Further directors:

- 1961–1965: Elizabeth Ann Ray
- 1965–1973: Jeanne M. Holm (first female two-star general in the United States)
- 1973–1975: Billie M. Bobbitt
- 1975–1976: Bianca D. Trimeloni

New WAF Privates Moore, Kinniebrue, Jackson and Gogue-Cook are issued their service uniforms for basic and extended training, February 1949

=== Recruits ===
The first WAF recruit was Sergeant Esther Blake who enlisted July 8, 1948, in the first minute that regular Air Force duty was authorized for women; Blake transferred from the WACs where she had a post in Fort McPherson, Georgia. Lackland Air Force Base, near San Antonio, Texas, was where the first cadre of WAFs reported. Recruits were expected to appear attractive and were schooled in posture and cosmetics along with their physical training and military indoctrination.

African-American recruits joined the WAFs in greater numbers in 1949 when basic training for women was desegregated in the USAF. Integration of quarters and mess was slower in coming.

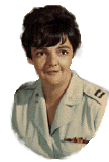
Captain Barbara A. Wilson, first enlisted WAF to complete Officer Training School

Barbara A. Wilson started as a Private at Lackland then steadily moved up the ranks. She was the first WAF to complete her Bachelor of Arts degree through a military program at Long Island University. She was the first enlisted WAF NCO (Technical Sergeant) to become an officer via Officer Training School (OTS). She retired at the rank of Major, and earned a master's degree in an Air Force Program at Southern Illinois University. She produced and hosted a TV program about antiques and wrote as a syndicated newspaper columnist in the '80s. Wilson, writing as "Captain Barb", maintains a website with information about women in all branches of the military: Women Military Veterans: Yesterday – Today – Tomorrow.

The first African-American female brigadier general of the USAF was Marcelite J. Harris who attained the rank in 1990. Harris took OTS at Lackland in 1966, after traveling with a USO tour to military bases in Germany and France. Harris said in a 1992 interview with Ebony: "Originally, I wanted to be an actress." After graduating from Spelman College with a BA in speech and drama she joined the WAFs. Specializing in aircraft maintenance, she served as a supervisor at Korat Air Base in Thailand, servicing Vietnam war aircraft. Harris later became Air Officer Commanding at the United States Air Force Academy in Colorado. She even picked up a degree in Business Management along the way. Circa 1992 Harris held a command at HQ USAF, Washington, D.C., where she was responsible for 125,000 airmen and an annual budget of $20 billion. She retired in 1997.

=== Uniforms ===
The first WAFs wore men's uniforms with neckties. Geraldine Pratt May quickly ordered women's uniforms, selecting herself the particular shade of blue. The cut of the winter uniform was modeled after those of airline flight attendants, using the same material as the men's winter uniforms. Instead of a necktie, tabs were worn on the collar. The effect was considered "smart and contemporary", The two-piece summer uniform, however, made of cotton-cord seersucker, fit poorly and required frequent ironing.

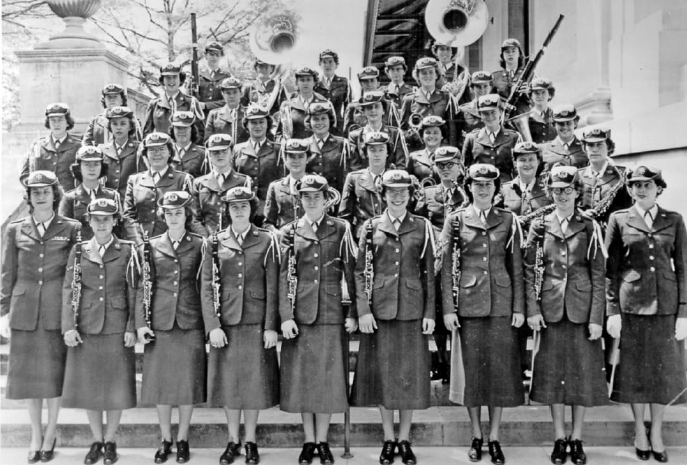
The WAF Band poses at USAF Band School at Bolling AFB in Washington, DC

=== WAF Band ===
The 543rd Air Force Band (WAF) was organized in January 1951 by Colonel George S. Howard, Chief of Bands and Music for the Air Force. Eighteen women musicians were directed by Private First Class Mary Divens. In December 1951, MaryBelle Johns Nissly was recruited by Howard to return to military life at the rank of captain to be given the tasks of conductor and commander of the WAF Band. Nissly had left Army service in 1946 as a warrant officer and had previously gained attention as a sergeant by starting the first Women's Army Band at Fort Des Moines in 1942 while she was with the Women's Auxiliary Air Corps (WAAC).

In its ten-year lifespan, the WAF Band was served by some 235 women musicians with approximately 50 members at any one time. Attrition from the organization was often caused by marriage, as band members were required to be single. They also had to be white; the Air Force knew the WAF Band would be touring the segregated Deep South and they did not want to cross the race barrier. Concerts were played all over the nation, including Hawaii, Alaska and Puerto Rico. At least one concert took them to Mexico.

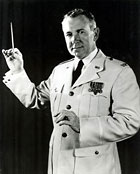
Colonel George S. Howard, USAF Chief of Bands and Music

The band marched in Eisenhower's two inaugurations, played in the freezing cold for JFK's inauguration and appeared occasionally on live television broadcasts. Home base for the WAF Band was first Lackland, moving in 1953 to Bolling AFB in Washington, D.C., where, by Air Force Regulation 190-21, published June 13, 1955, they were officially designated "United States WAF Band", acknowledging their de facto status as USAF representatives rather than their former status as a simple base band. Their official mission became to "assist, within their capabilities, in promoting Air Force objectives and enhancing the prestige of the Air Force and the United States." This meant there were now two bands serving as ambassadors of the USAF: the all-male Air Force Band and the WAF Band.

In 1957, while flying aboard a C-124 Globemaster II, the WAF Band was invited by General James L. Jackson, Deputy Commander of the San Bernardino Air Materiel Area, Air Materiel Command, to move to his headquarters at Norton AFB in San Bernardino, California. The move took place in January 1958. The band retained its training and chain-of-command connection with the USAF band school at Bolling. At Norton, the band found it easier to schedule C-124 planes and pilots to keep up their touring schedule.

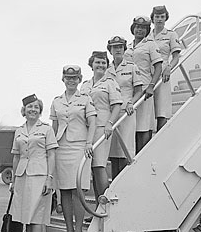
The first five enlisted WAFs in Vietnam arrive along with the fourth WAF officer. From bottom: Lt Col June H. Hilton, A1C Carol J. Hornick, A1C Rita M. Pitcock, SSgt Barbara J. Snavely, A1C Shirley J. Brown, and A1C Eva M. Nordstrom. Tan Son Nhut Air Base, June 1967

The WAF Band was inactivated in 1961, most likely victims of their success. Colonel Howard, as leader of the all-male band, had apparently grown less eager to share the spotlight. In 1960, he had diverted a special request for the WAFs to perform in Europe, substituting his band instead. That same year Howard issued a directive forbidding the WAF Band to appear at any civilian functions such as county fairs and schools where they had become popular. Nissly continued to accept these civilian invitations in contravention of the directive, allowing anti-women elements in the USAF an excuse to charge the WAF Band with insubordination. The band was dissolved. Band members were given the option of transferring to a different WAF unit but some left the service entirely. Colonel Howard retired on September 1, 1963. Nissly retired at the rank of Major in 1968.

The Sousa Archives and Center for American Music holds the Martha Awkerman WAF and Long Beach Band Papers, 1940–2002 which consists of scrapbooks, photographs, and recordings of cornet soloist Martha Awkerman and the WAF Band.

=== ROTC program ===
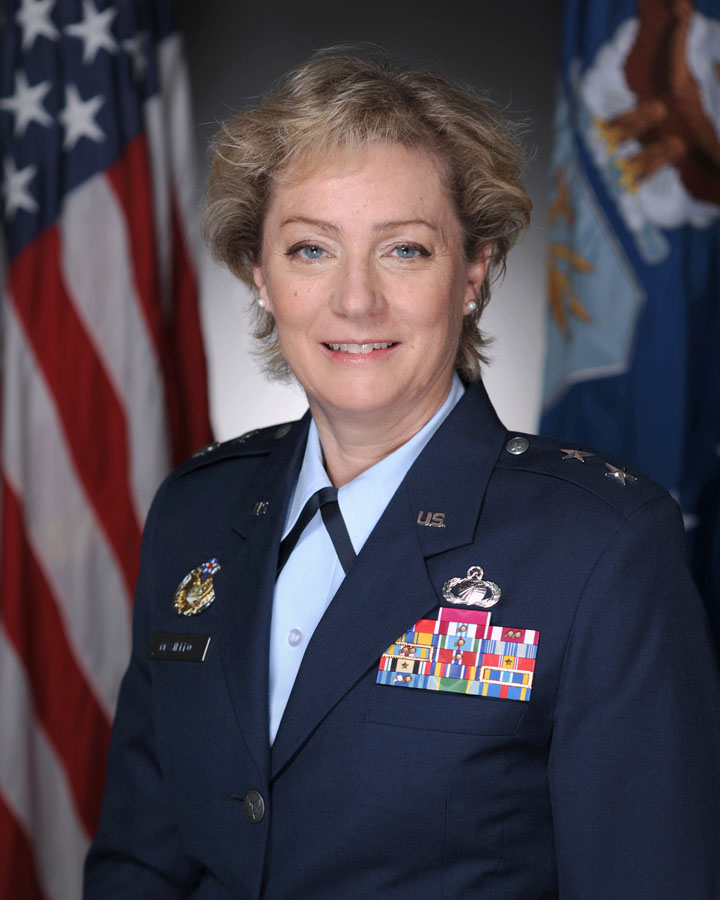
Maj. Gen. Wendy M. Masiello obtained her commission via ROTC at Texas Tech University.

In 1956, a WAF section was introduced into the Reserve Officer Training Corps (ROTC) program. Miss Janet Marshall of George Washington University was the first woman to enroll in the WAF Cadet ROTC Program.<USAFROTC History 1956> The program was ordered to be phased out by 1960 by order of the Secretary of the Air Force. By 1959 only 3 WAF ROTC units remained. <USAF ROTC History 1959>The downturn was not permanent and by 1970, the Air Force ROTC women cadet program had expanded to a more national scope. Major General Wendy M. Masiello, a 1980 graduate of Texas Tech University, is an example of high-ranking woman officer who was commissioned via Air Force ROTC.

== Closing chapter ==
In 1967, President Johnson signed Public Law 90-130, lifting grade restrictions and strength limitations on women in the military.

1973 saw the end of Selective Service (the "draft"), meaning military recruiting practices were beginning to experience radical changes. In 1976, women were accepted into the military on much the same basis as men; the separate status of WAF was abolished. That same year, the United States Air Force Academy began accepting females.

== See also ==
- Women in the military
  - Women Airforce Service Pilots (WASP)
  - Women's Army Corps (WAC)
  - WAVES
  - United States Marine Corps Women's Reserve
  - SPARS
- Women in the United States Air Force
- United States Army Air Forces
- United States Air Force
