= Naked Maja (postage stamps) =

Series of Spanish postage stamps based on the painting

The Naked Maja (Spanish: La maja desnuda)
- Type: Commemorative postage stamp
- Country of issue: Spain
- Date of issue: May 9, 1929–June 21, 1930

Maja desnuda series

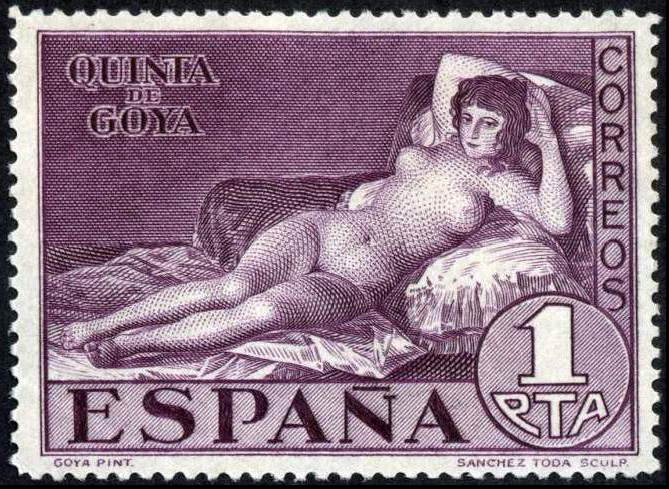
Scott#397

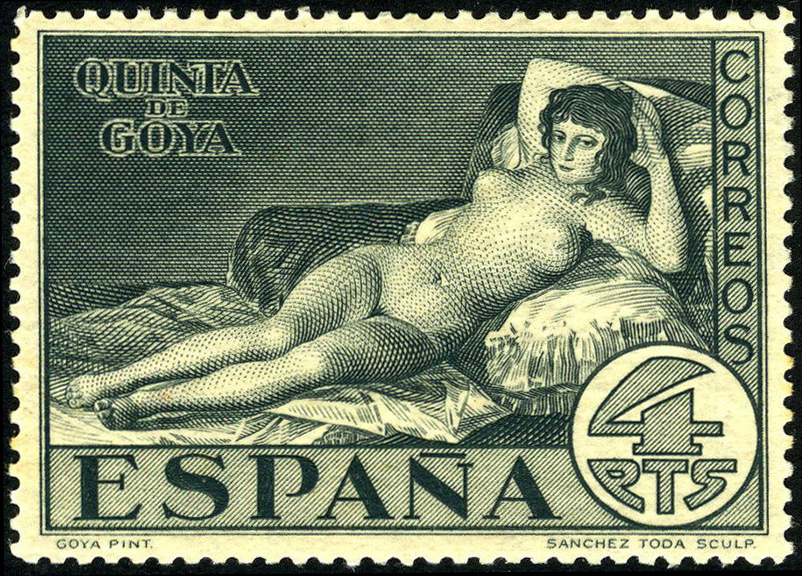
Scott#398

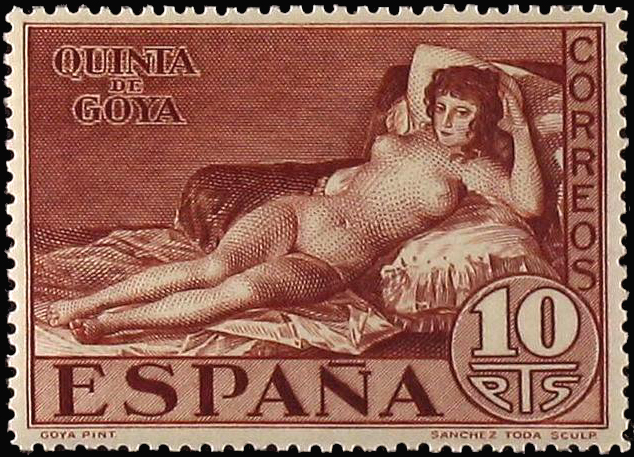
Scott#399

The Naked Maja (Spanish: La maja desnuda) is a philatelic name for three postage stamps of Spain of 1930 depicting the La maja desnuda painting (1800) by Francisco de Goya (1746–1828). They are part of a set marking the anniversary of the death of this Spanish artist, and are sometimes incorrectly considered the world's first postage stamp with nudes.

== Description ==
The complete set includes 32 stamps. 14 of them with denominations between 1 céntimo and 5 pesetas (Scott #386–396 and 400–402), have similar design in different colors—a portrait of Francisco de Goya in his mature years (1826) by Vicente López y Portaña.

The set also included 13 airmail stamps with etchings of Goya's Los caprichos and Los disparates cycles (Scott # C18-30), as well as two other express mail stamps: ordinary (Scott # E7), and air mail (Scott # CE1) stamps overprinted "urgente" ("urgent").

The remaining three highest denominations – dark purple (1 peseta), gray-green (4 pesetas) and red-brown (10 pesetas) (Scott # 397-399) – engraved by José Luis López Sánchez-Toda reproduce one of the most famous and controversial artist's paintings: La maja desnuda.

The size of the stamps is 47 × 34 mm, the paper is without watermarks, they have line perforation 12½. The impression techniques used are litography (#386-391) and chalcography (#391-402).

== Issue ==
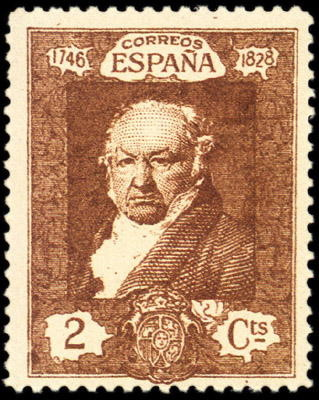
Portrait of Francisco de Goya, 1826 (Scott#387)

The issue was dedicated to the closure of the Ibero-American Exhibition in Seville (May 9, 1929 – June 21, 1930) and at the same time to the 100th anniversary of the death of Francisco de Goya. This is what most stamp catalogs state, despite the fact that the round anniversary was two years earlier, in 1928, and the date is also not the same: the artist died on 16 April, and the set was issued on 15 June.

Stamps with naked Maja were privately ordered from the London printer Waterlow & Sons, but the Spanish governmental mail service (Correos) recognized this issue as legitimate in exchange for a part of the circulation. The stated purpose of its distribution was to recoup construction costs of the Quinta de Goya (literally "Goya's country house"), exhibition hall entirely devoted to the works of the Spaniard, where some of his paintings and etchings were placed.

The set had a nominal value deliberately inflated in comparison to conventional postal rates (it was sold for the equivalent of US$5 at the time). The stamps went on sale on June 15, 1930 and were cancelled by four different types of postmarks. They were valid for the payment of postal services only for three days, until June 17, so they are rare cancelled, and most cancellations are forgeries of a later time, some of them contain an error ("CUINTA GOYA" instead of "QUINTA GOYA").

Information about the circulation sold during the three days vary. According to a New York newspaper, The Brooklyn Daily Eagle for August 1, 1930, 29,000 stamps of the first issue featuring the nude Maja, of all three denominations, were sold in total. According to today's versions, 9,800 10-peseta Majas and 231,000 Majas of the other two denominations (1 peseta and 4 pesetas) were issued.

== Background ==
Having lost the charm of its "Golden Age", economic prosperity, global leadership, and most of its colonial possessions, Spain in the 18th-19th centuries was experiencing chronic decline. The political and cultural dominance of its northern neighbor, France, especially telling on the Spanish elite, could not but cause aversion and strive for national liberation in the society, and intensified search of national identity as a way out of the crisis.

Majos and their girlfriend majas were representatives of fringe urban lumpenproletariat originating from Spanish provinces, and played a catalytic role in the public debate and turned their lower status into a way to express their freedom and rejection of afrancesado ('Frenchified', high society and traditional society of that time in general). Both maja men and women wore daggers at their belts, dressed provocatively and foppishly, deliberately behaved themselves arrogantly, were notable for freedom of manners, and sometimes lived on banditry and looting.

Strong nationalist overtones turned the image of maja, in fact a prostitute, into a cult of passionate and free Spanish woman. Nobility reinterpreted items of clothing from slums as an organic part of the Spanish national costume. Embodiment of this trend, majismo, became a favorite subject for Francisco Goya; and his painting La Maja Desnuda was in this sense a culmination. The artist, however, painted his work for a very small elite audience and hardly imagined that his Maja in less than a century and a half would be available to the general public in hundred thousands of copies.

In the 1920s–1930s, Spain was once again at a crossroads caused by its painful defeat in the Spanish–American War of 1898, the deepening economic crisis, and waves of separatism and widespread intellectual discussion about the "national identity of Spain." This pursuit resulted in a deep national division and, later, in a bloody civil war. The intellectuals of Generation of '98 needed strong and shocking symbols, means for daring embodiment of the national idea – and majismo came in handy. La maja desnuda postage stamps manifested it with a quite obvious underlying message for the Spanish society.

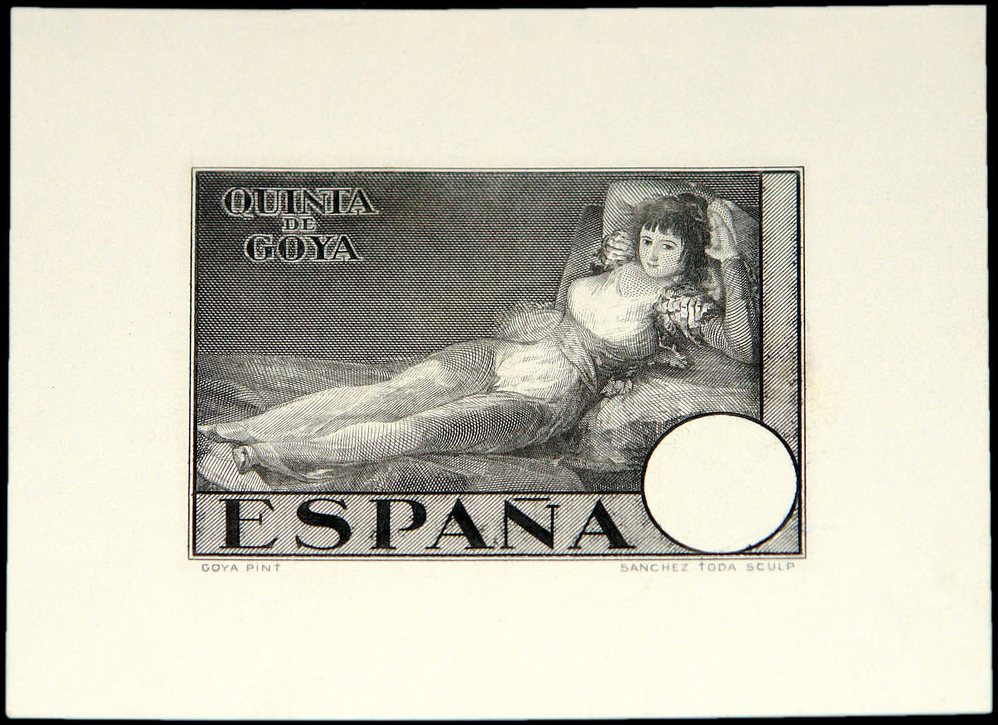
An essay of unissued postage stamps La maja vestida

In his book, El arte de grabar el sello, published in 1969, engraver of the series, José Sánchez-Toda, reproduced an alternative stamp essay prepared by him for issuance and depicting La maja vestida, just in case if Correos refused to approve the bolder option. Approval of La maja vestida would have preserved all symbolism of the issue, though such choice would have been less scandalous. The Spanish governmental mail service, however, went all in.

Despite the fact that postage stamps are officially a 'business card' of the issuing country, one of its official media symbols, and therefore sexual motives in their design are traditionally rare (and this is especially true for the first half of the 20th century), depicting naked flesh (both female and male) on postage stamps of that time was, strictly speaking, no news.

Naked or semi-naked females on postage stamps of the end of 19th — beginning of 20th century

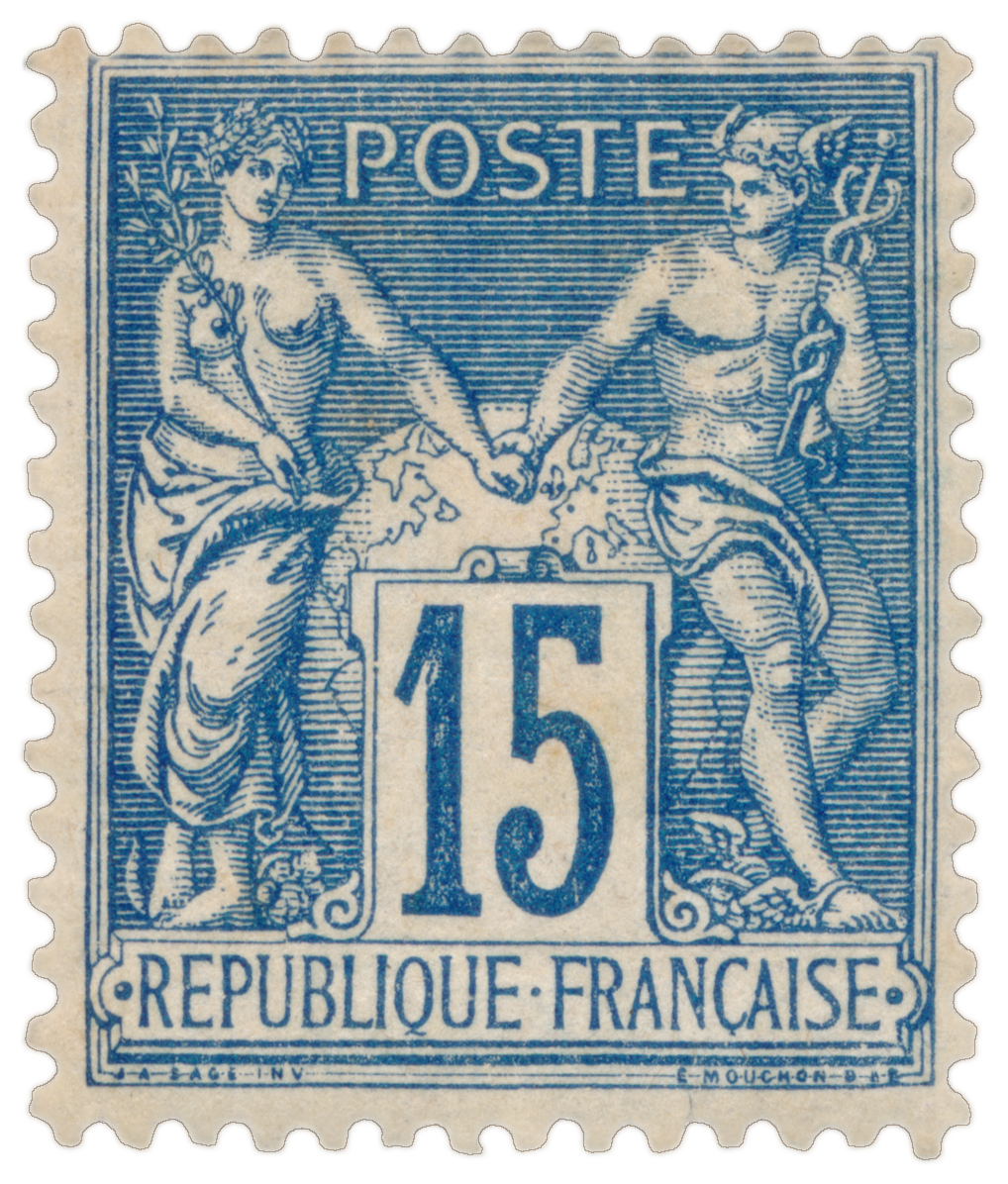
France (1892)

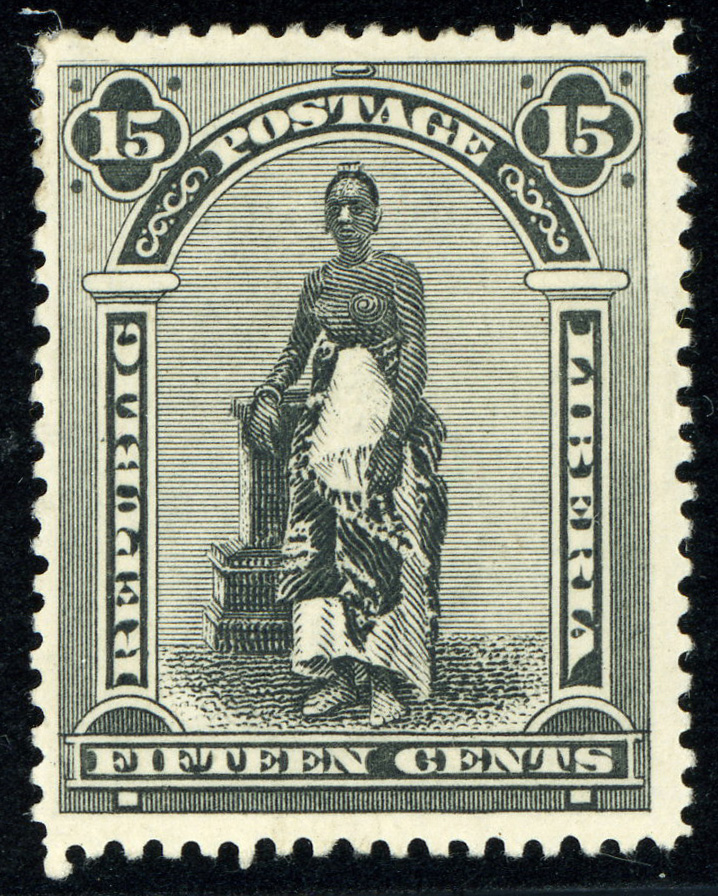
Liberia (1896)

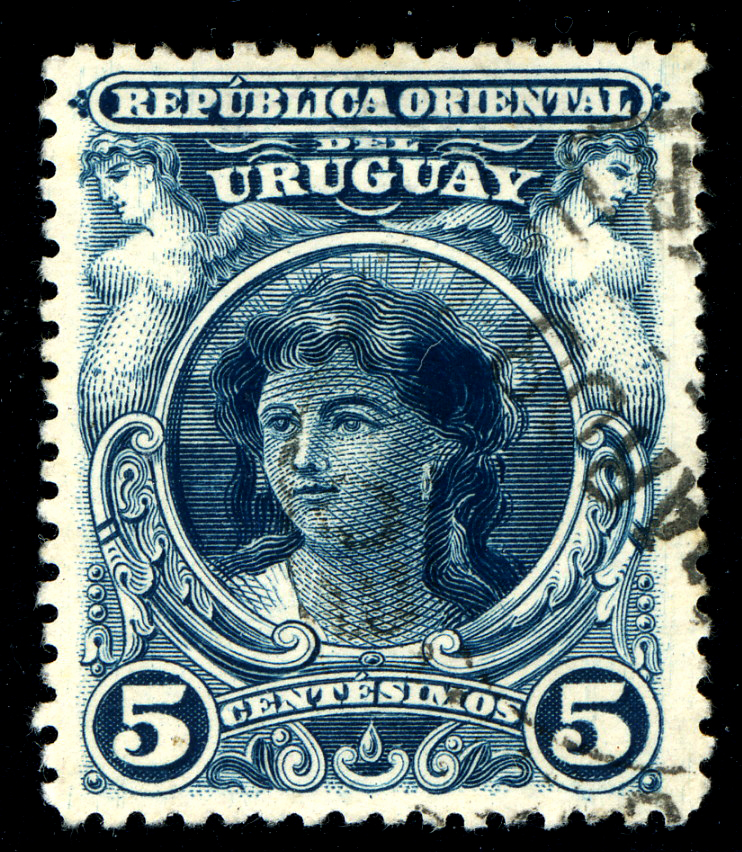
Uruguay (1900)

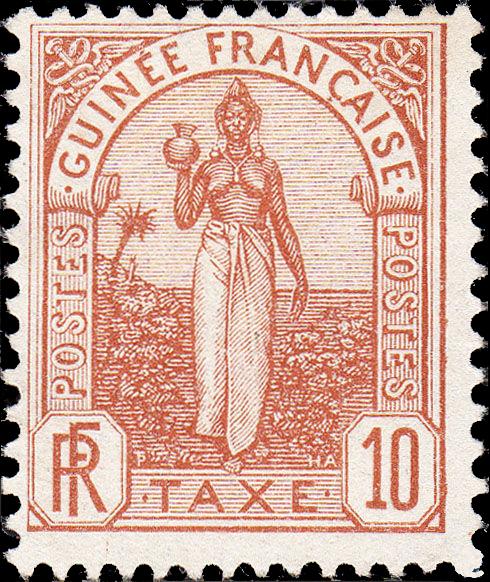
French Guinea (1905)

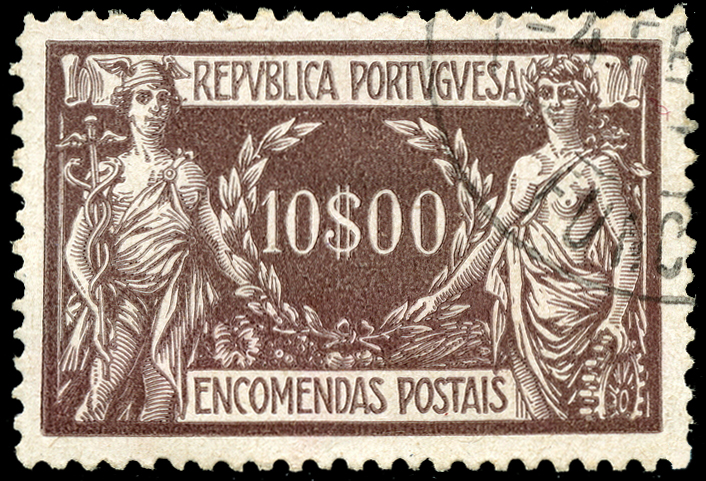
Portugal (1922)

Images of ancient statues or their imitations were quite common elements of design of both postage stamps and various fiscal stamps, vouchers, cheques, banknotes, and securities, i. e. any government and corporate securities that needed security printing against counterfeiting using aesthetically acceptable complication of the design. In addition, the stamps of African colonies often featured African women with naked breast. It was the La Maja Desnuda, however, that became the world's first case of open image of the body of a worldly woman (not a goddess) with pubic hair, thus opening a new popular topic in philately: nude.

== Response ==
Appearance in 1930 of the Maja Desnuda series caused a scandal in conservative Catholic Spain. The purists made loud public protests, denouncing the threat to public morality. According to them, in particular, such stamps would corrupt innocent children who collected stamps. At the same time, stamp dealers were displaying the shocking series in their shop windows.

Republicans actively used these stamps for political propaganda against corruption of decadent aristocracy and its monarchist supporters, which accelerated the change of the social system: in April 1931, i. e. less than a year later, the King of Spain Alfonso XIII fled and was deposed, the country was declared a republic, and its nobility was deprived of all privileges.

Meanwhile, the stamp scandal went beyond Spain itself. The Universal Postal Union started receiving protests (and some of them at the national level, which could result in a post war), but these protests, however, were not satisfied. Time, one of the leading US magazines of the time, wrote about a wave of indignation worldwide risen due to the issuance of these stamps. The edition explained:

An indecent picture is bad enough, but a postage stamp, whose back side must be licked! …Millions of innocent children collect stamps.

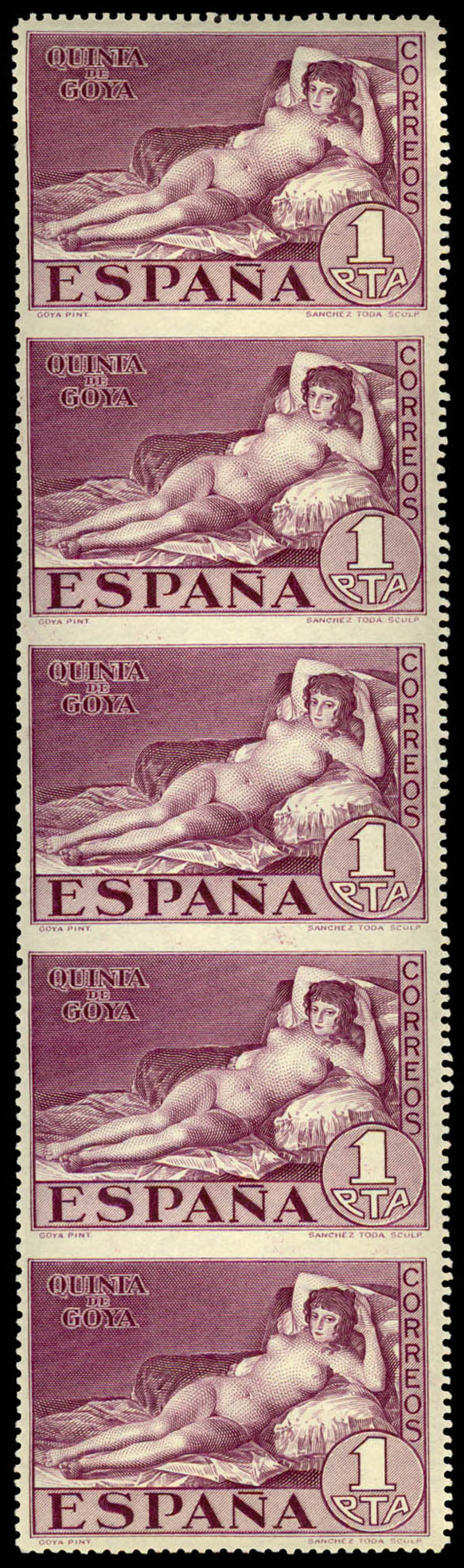
A strip of five stamps unperforated between

In 1952, Ostend police (Belgium) confiscated La maja desnuda stamps from the shop window of a local stamp dealer as "immoral.". Renown US humorist and columnist for The New Yorker Frank Sullivan loved to glue them on letters to his friends. Initially, postal authorities in various cities of the United States treated the shocking stamps differently: thus, in Boston in July 1930 they were mutilated in passing through the mails, while at the same time in Washington, DC, according to the press, “they had nothing to do with the stamp designs of other countries.” By the end of 1930, however, the U.S. Mail has officially banned all mail franked with the Majas from entering the country. Such mail was barred and apparently returned to senders. However, according to philatelic experts, not a single returned mail is known.

US authorities made their claims specific in 1958–1959, when a film by Henry Koster The Naked Maja came out co-produced by the USA, Italy and France. For advertising purposes, United Artists Corp. tried then to mail out 2,268 postcards announcing the film and carrying a reproduction of the Goya's painting La Maja Desnuda, but the distribution was halted by the Post Office Department, which held that it violated Sections 1461 and 1463 of Title 18 of the United States Code, forbidding the mailing of "lewd, lascivious or indecent" matter.

The film company's protest stating that the postcards reproduced a painting being publicly displayed in the Prado Museum in Madrid, was, however, rejected. At hearings, the court found that the presence of the La Maja Desnuda painting in the museum was not a crime, but distribution of such images is "sexy-pandering to a lewd and lascivious interest on the part of the average man." This legal rule is no longer in force in the United States (since 1996).

In 2000, the scandalous series of 1930 Spanish stamps was immortalized in a novel, Hit List by Lawrence Block, where the central character Keller described in detail his teenager collector's feelings in relation to its purchase. In philatelic literature La maja desnuda of 1930 is considered to be "[t]he best-known sexually related stamp in history, probably."

== Subsequent issues ==
In 1958, the Spanish La maja desnuda stamps were reproduced in the US on one stamp of the 10-stamp set with the most famous paintings of Goya issued for the Day of the Stamp. Another issue, an imperforated block of four stamps with four facsimiles of the 1930 4 pesetas Spanish stamp, albeit in different colors, was issued in the US in 1996. Both issues, however, were only a private initiative of local philatelic clubs.

In addition, Waterlow & Sons reprinted for several times in London all values of the scandalous set from the original printing plates, unloading onto the market circulations ten times exceeding the original circulation, between 1932 and 1969. These new prints cannot be distinguished from the original stamps, but even so they are still of interest to philatelists.

All stamps of the set exist in an imperforated form, and as line pairs and se-tenant stamps without perforations between the elements, but with external perforation. Some exist in the changed colors (mostly red and blue) as limited edition. It is known that only three imperforates were issued at a price approximately six times higher than normal perforated version in 1930.

As a result, in 2011 the Stamp News magazine evaluated three unused La maja desnuda stamps only at $20–30. At the end of 2015, the whole set could be found on the philatelic market for about $50. A complete kit including 'Urgente' overprints (Scott # 386-402, C18-30, CE1, E7) and specimens of all stamps ('muestra' overprints vertically on the left), is altogether valued on specialized philatelic online auctions at $350–400.

Over the past decades, the La Maja Desnuda painting by Goya has been repeatedly reproduced by other nations on their postage stamps, including countries with significant religious domination in society: Paraguay, the United Arab Emirates, Albania, etc.

== See also ==
- Postage stamp design error
- Postage stamps and postal history of Spain

== Bibliography ==
- Quesada, Eugenio de (1 October 2009). La leyenda de la maja desnuda (Estudio de la Emisión Quinta de Goya, 1930) (in Spanish). Afinet. ISBN 978-84-613-5735-2.
