= Sir John Shelley, 1st Baronet =

English nobleman

Sir John Shelley was an English nobleman and politician.

Shelley was created a baronet on 22 May 1611. He married Jane, daughter of Thomas Reresby.

Shelley was the eldest son of John Shelley and Eleanor, the daughter of Thomas Lovell of East Harling, county Norfolk.

Shelley and Jane had the following children:

- William Shelley, Knight, who married Christina, daughter of Sir James Vantelet, Knight
- John, who married Mary, daughter and heiress of George Bailley

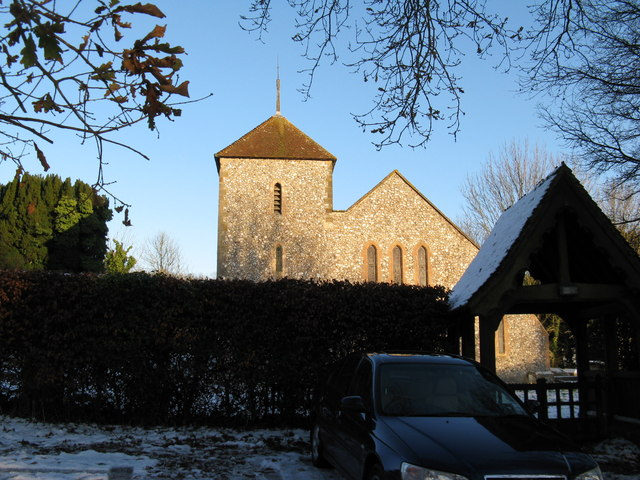
The Church of St. Mary the Virgin, Clapham

A depiction of Shelley can be seen on the memorial brass of his parents in St. Mary the Virgin Church, Clapham, West Sussex.
