= Shelley Smith =

Shelley Smith may refer to:

- Shelley Smith (writer) (1920–1998), British novelist
- Shelley Smith (sports reporter) (born 1958), American sports reporter
- Shelley Smith (actress) (1952–2023), American fashion model and actress
- Shelley Smith (American football) (born 1987), American football player
- Shelley Smith (singer), British singer in The X Factor

== See also ==
- Shelley Taylor-Smith (born 1961), swimmer
