= Ronald G. Shelley =

Ronald George Shelley (27 February 1932 – May 2003) was an expert on the philately of the Spanish Civil War.

In 2003 he bequeathed a collection of five volumes of covers, used to and from the International Brigades, to the British Library where it forms part of the British Library Philatelic Collections as the Shelley Collection.

The bulk of the rest of Shelley's collection was sold in January 2004 by Harmers of London in two sections, earlier Spanish philatelic material including pre-stamp and stampless covers and a 1601 document signed by King Philip III of Spain, and a large quantity of material relating to the Spanish Civil War.

== Selected publications ==
- The postal history of the Spanish Civil War, 1936-1939. Brighton: R.G. Shelley, 1967.
- Propaganda leaflets of the Spanish Civil War. Hove: R.G. Shelley, 1990.
