= Geraldine Pratt May =

American air force officer (1895–1997)

Colonel Geraldine Pratt May
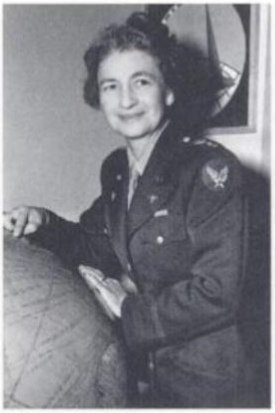
- Born: April 21, 1895
- Died: November 2, 1997 (aged 102) Menlo Park, California
- Buried: Arlington National Cemetery
- Allegiance: United States of America
- Branch: Women’s Army Corps; Women's Air Force; United States Air Force
- Rank: Colonel
- Awards: Legion of Merit

Col. Geraldine Pratt May (April 21, 1895 – November 2, 1997) was the first director of the Women's Air Force (WAF) and the first woman colonel in the United States Air Force.

== Military career ==
May joined the Women’s Army Auxiliary Corps (WAAC) in July 1942. She was promoted to staff director of WAAC’s Air Transport Command in March 1943.

In 1948, May became the first director of the newly created the Women's Air Force (WAF) and was promoted to the rank of colonel making her the first woman colonel in the United States Air Force.

May received the Legion of Merit for her service during World War II.

== Death and legacy ==
May died in Menlo Park, California at the age of 102. She is interred at Arlington National Cemetery.
