= Mary Michael Shelley =

American folk artist (born 1950)

- Born: 1950 (age 75–76); Doylestown, Pennsylvania
- Known for: Painting, Carving

Mary Shelley (born 1950 in Doylestown, Pennsylvania) is an American folk artist with no formal visual art training. Her art work has variously been described as naïve, primitive or self-taught. She graduated from Cornell University in 1972 with a degree in English and Creative Writing, and has lived her entire adult life in Ithaca, NY. She began making her painted low relief woodcarvings in 1974, after her father sent her a painted woodcarving (inspired by the art work of Mario Sanchez, Key West, Florida) that he made of Shelley as a child at the family farm. Shelley worked as a sign painter and carpenter from 1973 to 1990, and learning these trades helped her to develop woodworking and design skills important to her evolution into a visual artist.

Her work was shown at the Jay Johnson Folk Heritage Gallery from 1976 through 1990 when the gallery closed. From the start of her career until 2008, she has produced upwards of 2000 painted and carved wooden reliefs.

Shelley calls her work a “picture story” or “picture diary”. Many of her pieces are concerned with narrative, the telling of a story, the recording of an event. Shelley plays with metaphor, using cows and waitresses as stand-ins for her life experiences and feelings as a woman. Her work frequently contains veiled social commentary. She tends to work in series, the major among these being her diner, farm, outdoor, animal and dream series.

== Work in permanent collections ==
- Smithsonian Institution (Washington, DC)
- The John Judkin Memorial, American Museum in Britain, (Bath, England)
- American Folk Art Museum (New York City, NY)
- The High Museum (Atlanta, GA)
- Fenimore Art Museum (Cooperstown, NY)
- The National Museum of Women in the Arts (Washington, DC)
- Women’s Rights National Historical Park (Seneca Falls, NY)
- Anthony Petullo Art Collection of Self-Taught and Outsider Art (Milwaukee, WI)
- Absolut Vodka Art Collection
- World of Coca-Cola
