= Jeanne M. Holm =

United States Air Force general

Jeanne Holm
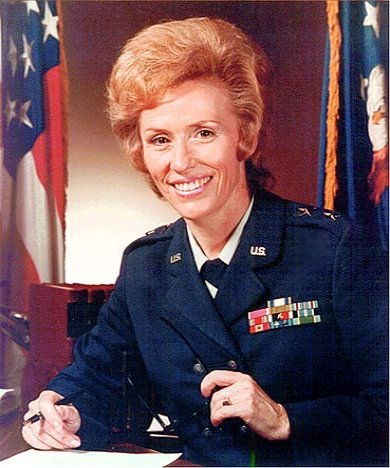
- Major General Jeanne M. Holm c. 1973
- Born: June 23, 1921; Portland, Oregon, U.S.
- Died: February 15, 2010 (aged 88); Annapolis, Maryland, U.S.
- Military career
- Allegiance: United States
- Branch: United States Army Air Forces; United States Air Force
- Service years: 1942–1946; 1948–1975
- Rank: Major General
- Commands: Women's Air Force
- Conflicts: World War II; Berlin Blockade
- Awards: Air Force Distinguished Service Medal; Legion of Merit

Major General Jeanne Marjorie Holm (June 23, 1921 – February 15, 2010) was the first female one-star general of the United States Air Force and the first female two-star general in any service branch of the United States. Holm was a driving force behind the expansion of women's roles in the Air Force.

== Early career ==
Holm was born Jeanne Marjorie Hannes on June 23, 1921, in Portland, Oregon. She enlisted in the Army in July 1942, soon after the Women's Army Auxiliary Corps (WAAC) was established by Congress. She attended Officer Candidate School at Fort Des Moines, Iowa, and in January 1943, received a commission as a "Third Officer," the WAAC equivalent of Second Lieutenant.

== World War II ==
During World War II, Holm was assigned to the Women's Army Corps Training Center at Fort Oglethorpe, Georgia, where she first commanded a basic training company and then a training regiment. At the end of the war, she commanded the 106th WAC Hospital Company at Newton D. Baker General Hospital, West Virginia. She then left active military duty in 1946 and attended Lewis and Clark College for two years, returning in 1956 for her Bachelor of Arts degree.

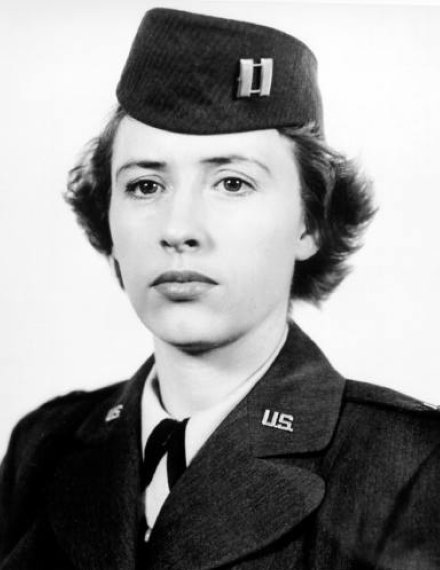
Captain Holm, company commander, 1948

In October 1948, during the Berlin Blockade, Holm was recalled to active duty with the Army and went to Camp Lee in Virginia, as a company commander within the Women's Army Corps Training Center. The following year she transferred to the Air Force and was sent to Erding Air Depot, Germany. There she served as assistant director of plans and operations for the 7200th Air Force Depot Wing, and later was War Plans Officer for the 85th Air Depot Wing, during the Berlin airlift and the early phases of the Korean War.

== Cold War ==
Holm returned from overseas in 1952 and became the first woman to attend the Air Command and Staff College at Maxwell Air Force Base in Montgomery, Alabama. She was then assigned to Headquarters U.S. Air Force in Washington, DC, as a personnel plans and programs officer in the Office of the Deputy Chief of Staff, Personnel.

Her next assignment was as chief of manpower in Allied Air Forces Southern Europe, a North Atlantic Treaty Organization headquarters, in Naples, Italy, where she served for four years. She returned to Headquarters U.S. Air Force in 1961 and was assigned as congressional staff officer for the director of manpower and organization. For her work in this assignment, she was awarded the Legion of Merit.

== WAF ==
In November 1965 Holm was appointed director of Women's Air Force (WAF), in the Office of the Deputy Chief of Staff, Personnel. Her appointment was extended twice, making her the longest-serving WAF director. She was responsible for overall staff cognizance of and advice on matters concerning military women in the Air Force. During her tenure, policies affecting women were updated, WAF strength more than doubled, job and assignment opportunities greatly expanded, and uniforms modernized. She was an active proponent for expanding the opportunities for women to serve in the Armed Forces and a catalyst for changing their roles and career opportunities within the Air Force. Historian Walter J. Boyne acknowledged her "enormous influence on the role of women in the Air Force". For her exceptionally meritorious service in this assignment, she was awarded the Air Force Distinguished Service Medal.

== Air Force leadership ==
Holm was promoted to the grade of brigadier general July 16, 1971, the first woman to be appointed in this grade in the Air Force. She was promoted to the grade of major general effective June 1, 1973, with date of rank July 1, 1970, and was the first woman in the Armed Forces to serve in that grade.

On March 1, 1973, Holm was appointed director of the Secretary of the Air Force Personnel Council. In this position, she was responsible for administration of the council and functioning of its boards and served as president of: the Air Force Discharge Review Board, Personnel Board, Board of Review, Physical Disability Appeal Board, Decorations Board and the Disability Review Board.

Holm retired from the Air Force in 1975.

== White House ==
After retiring, Holm consulted for the Defense Manpower Commission. In March 1976 Holm was named special assistant to President Gerald Ford for the Office of Women's Programs. Holm helped Ford attract more female voters by reaching out to women's groups and making note of women's issues. Holm detailed for Ford a plan for presentation to the Justice Department which would authorize a full re-examination of the United States Code to determine whether the wording of any law was sex-based and not justified. Ford directed the attorney general to begin the task and announced it to the public on July 1, 1976. At the polls, women voters favored Ford by a small percentage but were outnumbered by a larger male turnout. Males favored Jimmy Carter just enough to give him 50.1% of the popular vote.

== Awards and recognition ==
Holm was a member of the Board of Trustees, Air Force Historical Foundation; member of the Board of Directors of Camp Fire Girls; member of Board of Directors of the Pentagon Federal Credit Union; and member of the Air Force Association. She received the Distinguished Alumni Award from Lewis and Clark College in 1968; Citation of Honor from the Air Force Association in 1971; and the Eugene Zuckert Leadership Award from the Arnold Air Society in 1972.

Holm was inducted into the National Women's Hall of Fame in 2000. In 2003, the Air Force Association conferred upon her their Lifetime Achievement Award. Holm was inducted into the International Women in Aviation Hall of Fame in 2006. A section of Air University was reorganized in 2008 and renamed the Jeanne M. Holm Officer Accession and Citizen Development Center.

Military Decorations

Air Force Distinguished Service Medal
Legion of Merit
Women's Army Corps Service Medal
American Campaign Medal
World War II Victory Medal
Army of Occupation Medal with Berlin Airlift Device
Medal for Humane Action
National Defense Service Medal with bronze service star
Air Force Longevity Service Award with silver and bronze oak leaf clusters
Small Arms Expert Marksmanship Ribbon

== Effective dates of promotion ==
Promotions
Insignia	Rank	Date
	Major General	June 1, 1973
	Brigadier General	July 16, 1971

== Author ==
Holm wrote two books about women in the military, beginning with Women in the Military: An Unfinished Revolution in 1982. Holm updated the book in 1992–1994, filling in American women's combat and military experiences in the invasions of Grenada, Panama and in the Gulf War. In 1998, Holm published a history of American women serving in World War II, entitled In Defense of a Nation: Servicewomen in World War II, summarizing the experiences of women serving all of the military arms.

In 2003 Holm assisted author Linda Witt in her writing of the book A Defense Weapon Known to be of Value: Servicewomen of the Korean War Era, published in 2005. Holm described for Witt the history of the WAF in the early 1950s and the trials women experienced as they made their way through the male-dominated military.

== Personal life ==
Holm was an accomplished snow and water skier, student of ancient history, scuba diver and skipper of her own power cruiser. Prior to entering military service, she was a professional silversmith.

On February 15, 2010 in Annapolis, Maryland, Holm died from pneumonia in both lungs. Funeral services for Holm were conducted at Arlington National Cemetery on March 29, 2010, with full military honors.

== See also ==
- List of female United States military generals and flag officers
