= Opha May Johnson =

United States Marine Corps reservist (1878–1955)

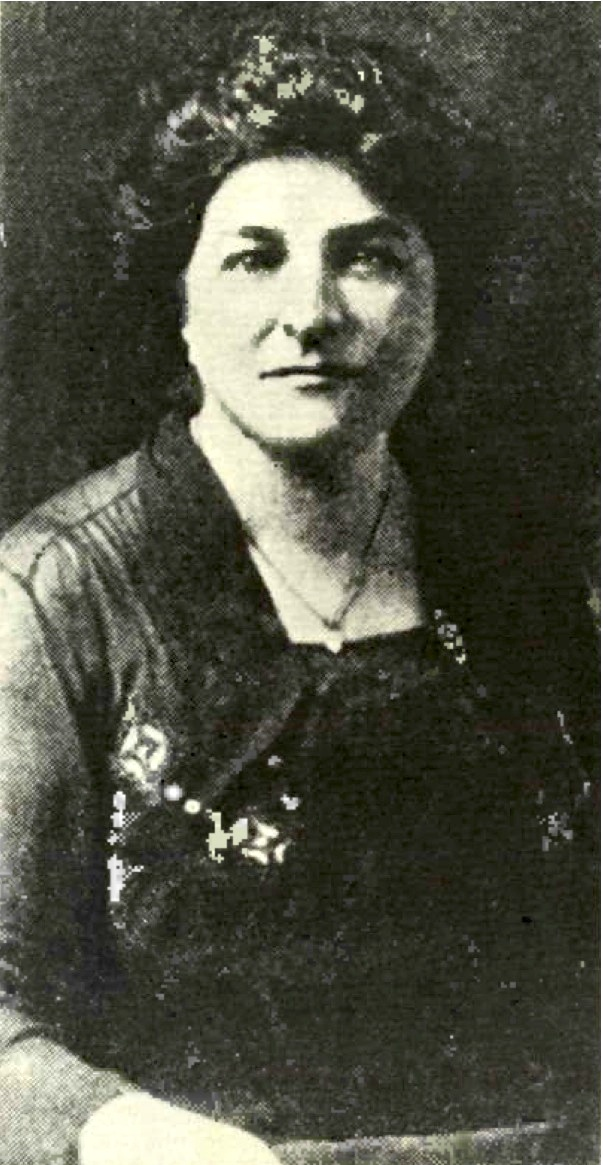
- Opha May Johnson in 1918
- Born: Opha May Jacob; May 4, 1878; Kokomo, Indiana, U.S.
- Died: August 11, 1955 (aged 77); Washington, D.C., U.S.
- Burial place: Rock Creek Cemetery
- Spouse: Victor Hugo Johnson (m. 1898; died 1950)
- Military career
- Allegiance: United States
- Branch: United States Marine Corps
- Service years: 1918–1919
- Rank: Sergeant
- Unit: Marine Corps Reserve

Opha May Johnson (née Jacob, May 4, 1878 – August 11, 1955) was an American Marine reservist who was the first woman known to have enlisted in the United States Marine Corps. She joined the Marine Corps Reserve on August 13, 1918, officially becoming the first female Marine.

== Early years ==
Opha May Jacob was born on May 4, 1878, in Kokomo, Indiana. She graduated from the shorthand and typewriting department of Wood's Commercial College in Washington, D.C., in 1895. As salutatorian of her class, she "entertained the audience with a carefully prepared paper." Jacob married Victor Hugo Johnson (1873–1950) on December 20, 1898, at the Sixth Presbyterian Church in D.C. At the time of their marriage, Victor Johnson was the musical director at the Lafayette Square Opera House. Prior to joining the Marines, Johnson was in the Civil Service, working for the Interstate Commerce Commission.

== Military service ==
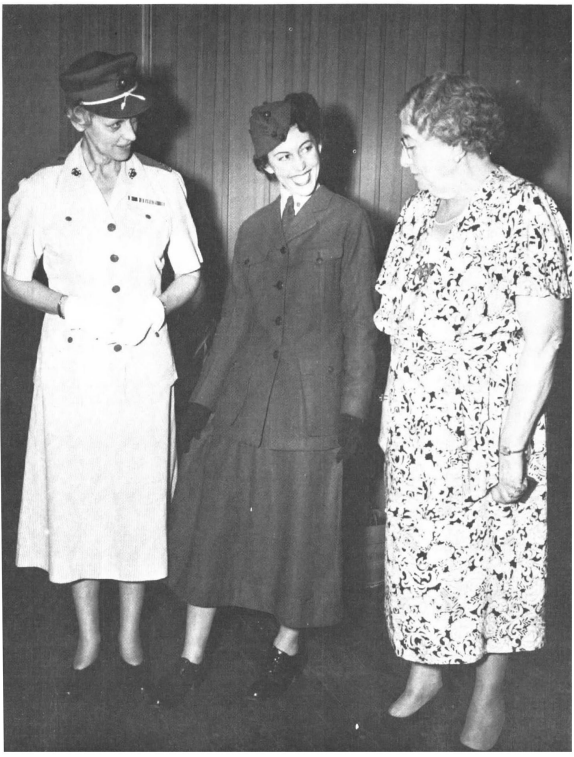
Sergeant Johnson (right) and Colonel Katherine Towle (left), looking at PFC Muriel Albert (center) wearing Johnson's uniform in 1946

Johnson became the first known woman to enlist in the Marine Corps on August 13, 1918, when she joined the Marine Corps Reserve during World War I. Johnson, due to being first in line that day, was the first of over 300 women to enlist in the reserve during the war. She was 39 years old at enlistment.

According to 1918 newspaper articles, as well as the published history of Women Marines in World War I, Johnson's first duties were as a clerk at Headquarters Marine Corps, managing the records of other female reservists who joined after she did. She was promoted to sergeant in September and was the highest-ranking woman in the Marines during her time in service.

On July 11, 1919, the American Legion granted a charter to the first post of women's Marine reservists. Known as Belleau Wood Post No. 1, its membership consisted of 90 women who had worked at Marine headquarters. Johnson was a charter member of the post.

At the end of World War I the Marines, like all services, began the steady disenrollment of women, including Johnson, from active service. After her brief military career, she became a clerk in the War Department and worked for the Marines as a civil servant until retiring in 1943.

== Common biographical errors ==
Marine historians have pointed out that errors concerning Johnson have been circulated and published, the first of which concerns her middle name. Although many have identified the spelling of her middle name as Mae, Johnson spelled her middle name May on her enlistment form.

The second error typically published is her age when she enlisted. Although many report her birth year as 1900, placing her in her late teens at the time of her enlistment, she is known to have been 39 at enlistment.

A third error involves her official photograph. Another well-known photograph of three female Marine PFCs (Mary Kelly, May O'Keefe, and Ruth Spike) in 1918, was cropped to show just the center figure and published correctly as being May O'Keefe. At a later date, that cropped picture was erroneously attributed as being Johnson and subsequently used by otherwise reliable sources.

== Death and burial ==
Johnson died on August 11, 1955, at Mount Alto Veterans Hospital in Washington, D.C. Services were held at Warner E. Pumphrey Funeral Home on August 13, 1955, 37 years to the day from when she stood first in the line of women who became Marines. Buried near her husband and parents in Rock Creek Cemetery, her grave was unmarked.

== Commemoration ==
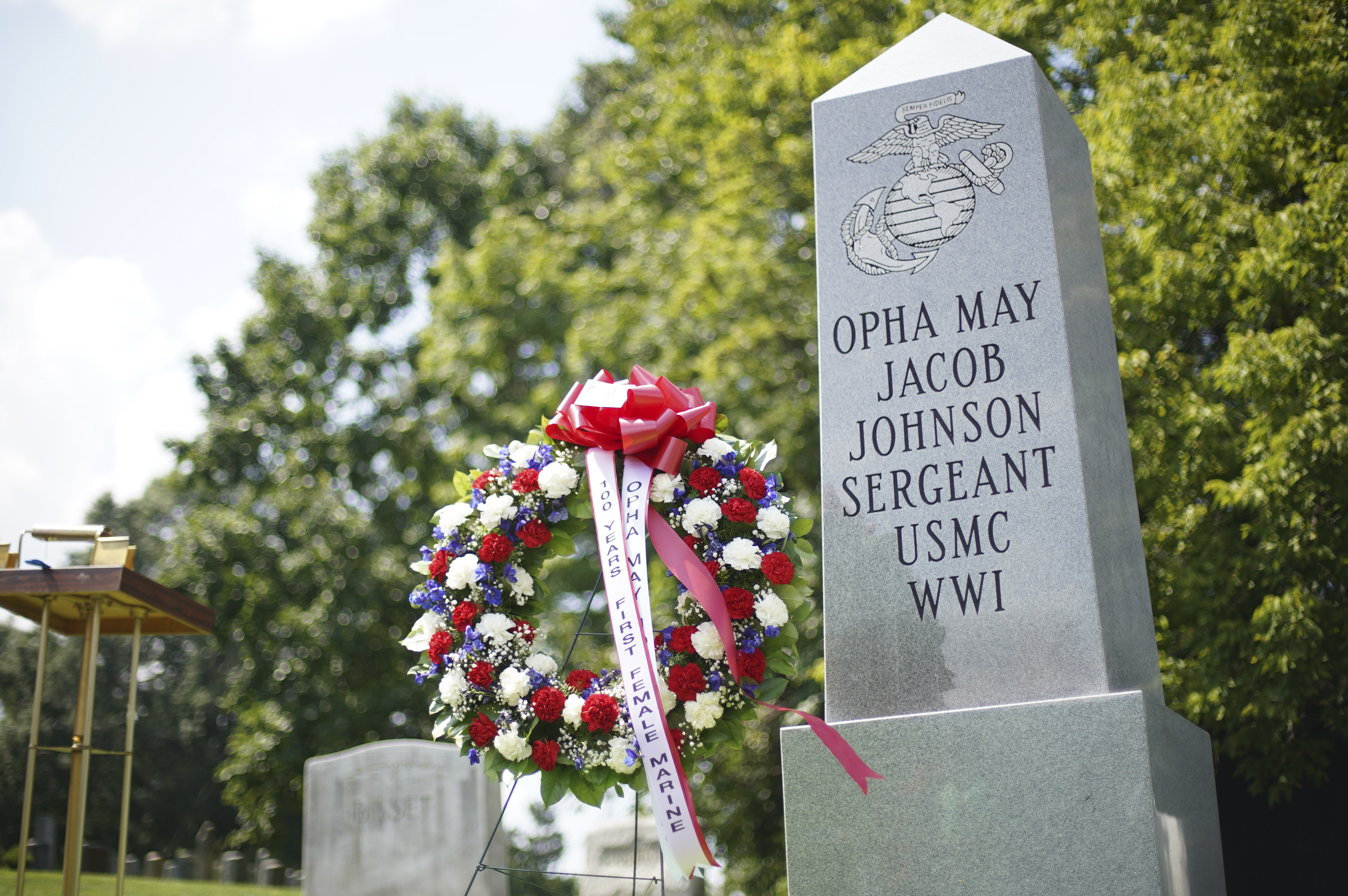
Johnson's grave marker, unveiled on August 29, 2018

In late 2017, the Women Marines Association began raising funds to place a marker at Johnson's burial site. On August 29, 2018, she received a grave marker which celebrated 100 years of women in the marines.

The Marine training center at Grissom Air Reserve Base was renamed the Sergeant Opha May Johnson Marine Reserve Center on November 10, 2022, which was the 247th anniversary of the founding of the Marines. The next day, a monument honoring Johnson was unveiled in Kokomo, Indiana.
