= Sclerotiaria =

Scientific classification
- Kingdom: Plantae
- Clade: Tracheophytes
- Clade: Angiosperms
- Clade: Eudicots
- Clade: Asterids
- Order: Apiales
- Family: Apiaceae
- Subfamily: Apioideae
- Tribe: Coriandreae
- Genus: Sclerotiaria; Korovin
- Species: S. pentaceros

Binomial name
- Sclerotiaria pentaceros (Korovin) Korovin

Synonyms
- Kosopoljanskia pentaceros Korovin; Schtschurowskia pentaceros (Korovin) Schischk.

Species of flowering plant

Sclerotiaria is a monotypic genus of flowering plants belonging to the family Apiaceae. The only species is Sclerotiaria pentaceros. It is also in Tribe Coriandreae.

It is native to Kazakhstan in Central Asia.

The genus name of Sclerotiaria is a compound word derived from Greek skleros meaning hard and also tiara - a Persian diadem, or small crown. The Latin specific epithet of pentaceros is a compound word, penta meaning five and ceros from greek (kéras) meaning horn. Both the genus and the species were first described and published in Trudy Inst. Bot. Akad. Nauk Kazakhst. S.S.R. Vol.13 on page 243 in 1962.
