= Julia E. Hamblet =

20th century American military officer

Julia E Hamblet
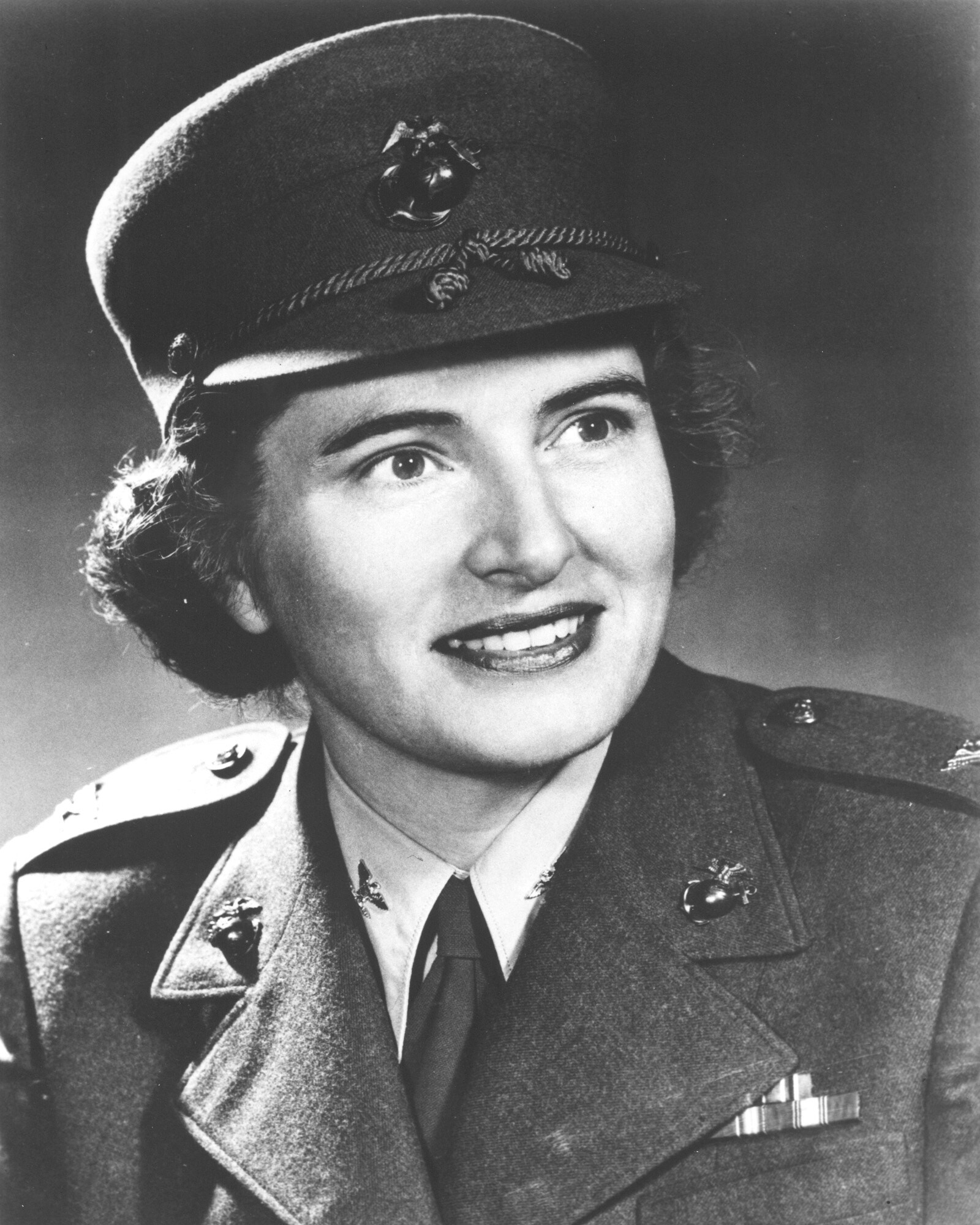
- Born: Julia Estelle Hamblet; May 12, 1916; Winchester, Massachusetts, U.S.
- Died: April 17, 2017 (aged 100); Williamsburg, Virginia, U.S.
- Military career
- Allegiance: United States
- Branch: United States Marine Corps
- Service years: 1943–1965
- Rank: Colonel
- Awards: Legion of Merit

Colonel Julia Estelle Hamblet (May 12, 1916 – April 17, 2017) was an American military officer, who served two separate tours of duty as director of Women Marines. She served as director of the United States Marine Corps Women's Reserve (1946–1948), and later as director of Women Marines (1953–1959).

== Pre-military career ==
Born on May 12, 1916, in Winchester, Massachusetts, she was the daughter of Able, a chemical engineer, and Marcia (née Coburn) Hamblet. After attending the Hartridge School (Plainfield, New Jersey), she entered Vassar College (Poughkeepsie, New York), graduating in 1937 with a B.A. degree. She earned a master's degree in public administration from Ohio State University in 1951.

== Career ==
From 1937 to 1943, she served with the United States Information Service in Washington, D.C. In April 1943, she entered the Marine Corps and was assigned to the first Marine Corps Women's Reserve Officer Training Class at Mount Holyoke, Massachusetts. On completing the course, she was commissioned a first lieutenant in the Women's Reserve, 4 May 1943. She was selected as adjutant to then-Captain (later Colonel) Katherine A. Towle at the Women's Recruit Training Center at Hunter College in New York.

During subsequent tours of duty, she served at bases in Camp Lejeune, North Carolina; Camp Pendleton, California; and at Quantico, Virginia. Before the end of World War II, she was commanding Aviation Women's Reserve Group I, numbering some 2,600 women, at the Marine Corps Air Station, Cherry Point, North Carolina. For her service during this period, she was awarded a Letter of Commendation with Commendation Ribbon.

Hamblet was released from active duty in July 1946. However, two months later she was recalled to Headquarters Marine Corps (Washington, D.C.) as a major, to serve as the third director of the Women's Reserve, from September 1946 to November 1948, succeeding Towle. With the passage of the Women's Armed Forces Integration Act in 1948, a transfer of personnel into the regular components of the Marine Corps with the title of Women Marines was effectuated. Hamblet accepted a regular commission as a major in the Women Marines on 4 November 1948. On 24 August 1949, she was promoted to lieutenant colonel.

In 1951, after completing graduate work at Ohio State University, she was assigned to the staff of the commander, Fleet Marine Force, Pacific, with headquarters in Hawaii. The following year, she was named officer in charge of the Women Officers Training Detachment, Marine Corps Schools, Quantico.

On 1 May 1953, she assumed duty as director of Women Marines, again succeeding Colonel Towle, who was retiring. The post carried with it the rank of colonel; Hamblet continued to serve in that capacity when her four-year tour of duty was extended to 1 March 1959. Later that same month, she was assigned duty in Naples, Italy, as military secretary to the Commander-in-Chief, Allied Forces, Southern Europe.

In May 1962, upon her return from Italy, she reported to the Marine Corps Recruit Depot, Parris Island, as commanding officer, Women's Recruit Training Battalion, and served in this capacity until her retirement three years later.

== Legacy ==
Hamblet retired completely from active service on May 1, 1965, with the rank of colonel. She was awarded the Legion of Merit upon retirement for "outstanding service as planner, administrator and leader of Women Marines throughout a distinguished career which encompassed every major assignment in the women's program…". Col Hamblet was instrumental in opening active duty military to women instead of only having access to the reserve components (WAVES, WAC, etc.).

== Later years ==
She retired to Arlington, Virginia, and did volunteer work with the American Red Cross and the YWCA.

== Death ==
Hamblet died at age 100 on April 17, 2017, in Williamsburg, Virginia.

Military offices
Preceded by Katherine Amelia Towle	Director of the USMC Women's Reserve; 1946-1948	Succeeded by N/A
Preceded by Katherine Amelia Towle	Director of Women Marines; 1953-1959	Succeeded by N/A
