= Military tiara =

Ceremonial headdress worn by female military officers

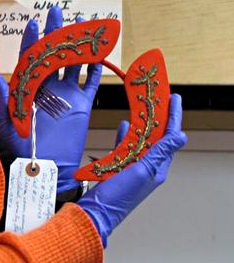
A red United States Marine Corps tiara archived in the collections of the National Museum of American History

A military tiara is a type of ceremonial headdress worn by female military officers during formal occasions. It is authorized for indoor wear by some senior, female officers of the United States' uniformed services while in mess dress. Beginning with the Marine Corps in 1973, individual service branches have gradually abolished use of the tiara. The United States Air Force does not wear tiaras and has never authorized wear of a military tiara.

== NOAA Corps ==
The NOAA Corps authorizes the optional wear of a black tiara by female commanders and higher-ranked officers with mess dress while indoors.

== Public Health Service ==
The PHS Commissioned Corps abolished use of the tiara as an optional uniform accessory effective August 1, 2009.

== United States Air Force ==
The United States Air Force has not adopted a tiara as a uniform component.

== United States Army ==
The United States Army tiara was blue with gold oak leaves and was authorized for optional wear by female colonels and higher-ranked officers with mess dress while indoors.

== United States Coast Guard ==
In 2011 the United States Coast Guard deauthorized use of the Coast Guard tiara as an optional uniform item. At this time the tiara was also deauthorized for use by the United States Coast Guard Auxiliary.

== United States Marine Corps ==
The United States Marine Corps (USMC) tiara was originally patterned in red with gold embellishments. It was designed by Mainbocher for Colonel Katherine Amelia Towle and debuted by her, along with Mainbocher's prototype of the first Marine Corps women's evening dress uniform, at the Marine Corps Birthday Ball in November 1950. Following the promotion of Colonel Margaret Henderson to Director of Women Marines, the tiara was refashioned in black; Henderson reportedly found the red tiara unflattering to her as she had red hair. Always an optional uniform item, in 1973 it was abolished altogether.

== United States Navy ==
The United States Navy tiara was a crescent shaped hat made of black velvet and authorized for optional wear by female commanders and higher-ranked officers with mess dress while indoors. By 2015 the Navy reported very few sales of tiaras and the item was discontinued as an optional uniform accessory effective October 1, 2016. As of 14 Feb 2024 the United States Navy has reauthorized the tiara.

== See also ==
- Tiara
