= Towle, California =

Unincorporated community in California, United States

Towle
- Unincorporated community
- Location in California Towle (the United States)
- Coordinates: 39°12′15″N 120°47′57″W
- Country: United States
- State: California
- County: Placer County
- Elevation: 3,694 ft (1,126 m)

Towle (formerly, Towles) was an unincorporated community in Placer County, California. Towle was located on the Southern Pacific Railroad, 2 miles (3.2 km) east of Dutch Flat. It lies at an elevation of 3694 feet (1126 m).

== History ==
The name honors George and Allen Towle, local lumbermen. The Towle post office operated from 1891 to 1935. Towle was the site where a narrow-gauge lumber railroad connected to the Southern Pacific; it had stores, a town hall, and boarding houses. Most of Towle had been abandoned by the time Interstate 80 was built through the area. Only the foundation of the train station remains today.

== Notable person ==
- Katherine Amelia Towle (1898–1986), United States Marine Corps officer and educator, was born in Towle.
