= Katherine Amelia Towle =

U.S. Marine colonel

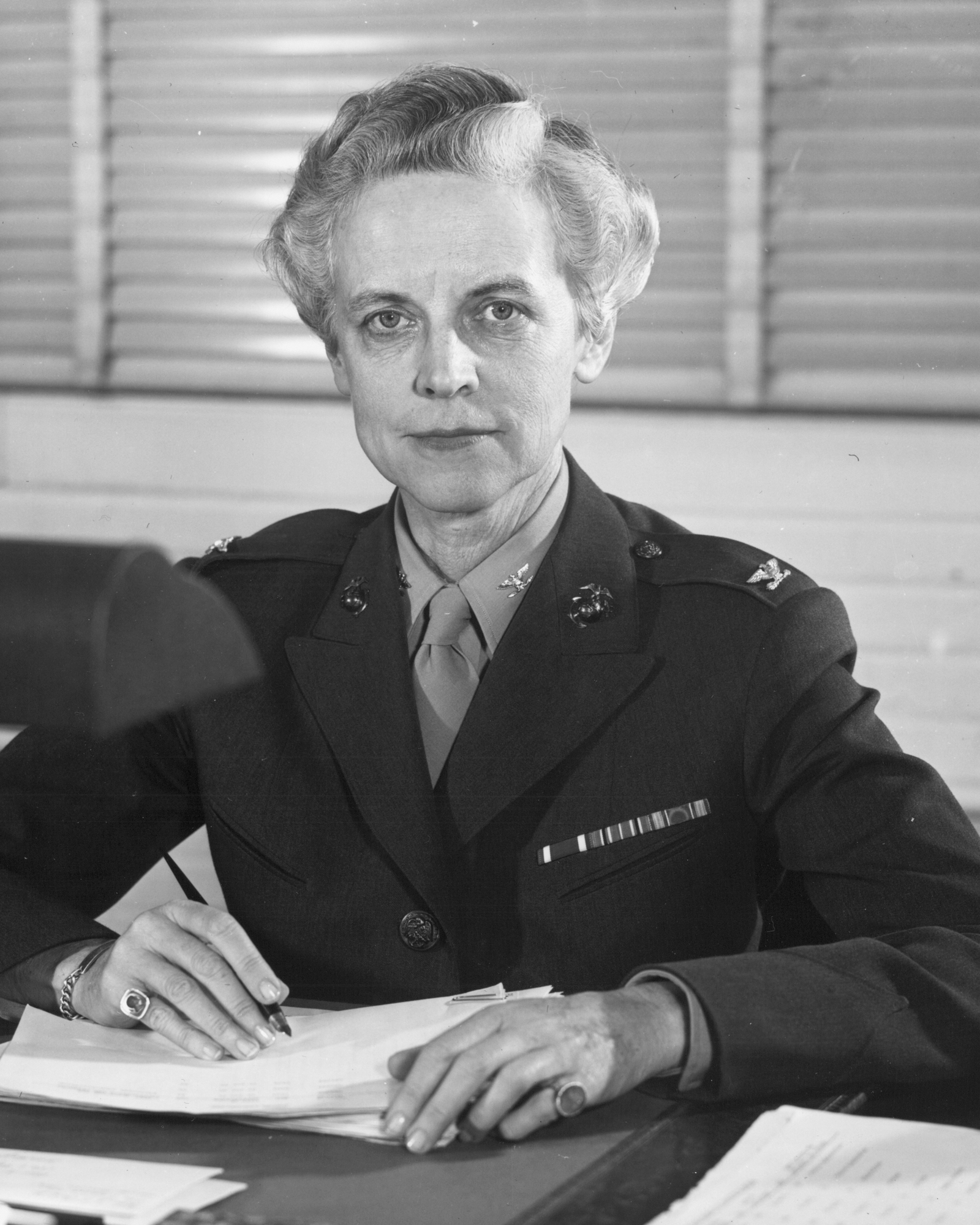
- Katherine A. Towle, 1st Director of the Women Marines
- Born: April 30, 1898; Towle, California, U.S.
- Died: March 1, 1986 (aged 87) Pacific Grove, California, U.S.
- Allegiance: United States of America
- Branch: United States Marine Corps
- Service years: 1943–1953
- Rank: Colonel
- Commands: Women's Reserve (1945–1946); Women Marines (1948–1953)
- Awards: Legion of Merit; Navy Commendation Medal
- Other work: Dean of students, UC Berkeley

Colonel Katherine Amelia Towle (April 30, 1898 – March 1, 1986) was the second director of the United States Marine Corps Women's Reserve (USMCWR) and the first director of Women Marines.

== Biography ==
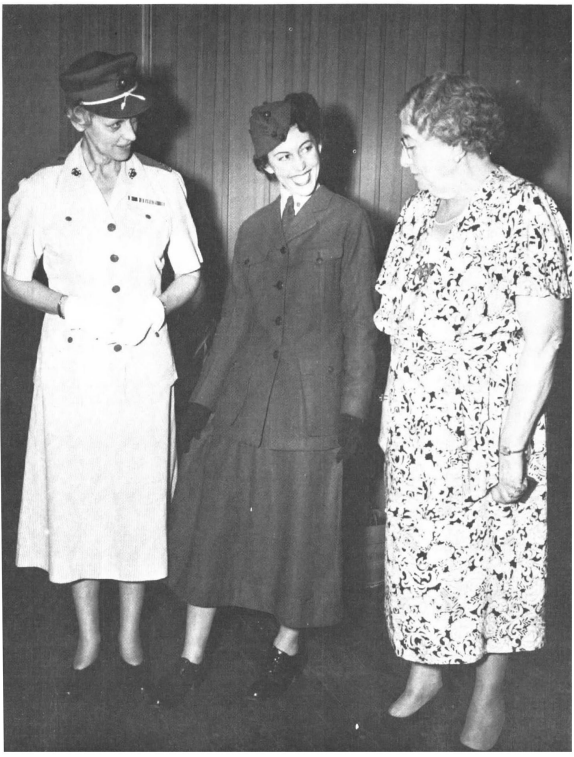
Katherine Towle (far left) in 1946, with Opha May Johnson (far right). They are looking at Opha May Johnson's uniform being worn by PFC Muriel Albert.

Towle was born in Towle, California on April 30, 1898. (The town was named after her paternal grandfather and uncles who settled there in the 1850s.) She moved with her family to California in 1908. She graduated with honors from University of California, Berkeley in 1920, then later earned a Master's degree in political science in 1935.

=== Marine Corps career ===
She came to the Marine Corps from UC Berkeley in 1943. Her first assignment with the new women's component was even before public announcement of the establishment of the Women's Reserve on February 13, 1943. She was named Women's Reserve (WR) representative for Women's Recruit Depot with the rank of captain, USMCWR, (with date of rank February 24, 1943).

Colonel Towle was named director when her predecessor, Colonel Ruth Cheney Streeter, retired on December 7, 1945. She served in that capacity until June 1946. In August of the same year, when the Women's Reserve was deactivated, Colonel Towle returned to the University of California as assistant dean of women.

Again, after the Congress had authorized the acceptance of women into the regular armed services, the Marine Corps called upon Colonel Towle to direct this organization. On November 4, 1948, she returned to the corps to become the first director of Women Marines after they were constituted a regular component.

In 1950 the Marine Corps contracted the fashion design house of Mainbocher to design new uniforms for the Women Marines. The prototype of the first Marine Corps women's evening dress uniform was tailored expressly for Colonel Towle. It was first worn in public at the 175th anniversary Marine Corps Birthday Ball in 1950. The uniform included a red tiara with gold embellishments. As another design of evening dress uniform was eventually adopted, Colonel Towle's evening dress uniform was a "one of a kind." This uniform is now in the museum collection of Artillery Company of Newport in Newport, Rhode Island.

Colonel Towle served as director of Women Marines until her retirement on April 30, 1953.

Her military awards included the Legion of Merit, Navy Commendation Medal, American Campaign Medal and World War Two Victory Medal. Eight days before Colonel Towle's retirement, President Eisenhower created the National Defense Service Medal retroactive to June 27, 1950. She was, thus, eligible for the medal but it is uncertain if she was ever formally awarded it.

=== University dean ===
After retiring from the Marine Corps, Towle was succeeded by Colonel Julia Hamblet. Towle was later associated with the University of California at Berkeley in various capacities: as dean of women from 1953 to 1960; as assistant dean of students from 1960 to 1965; as dean of students, 1965–66; and later as dean of students, emeritus. She was the first female to serve as dean of students.

=== Death ===
Towle died on March 2, 1986, at her home in California at the age of 87.

== Legacy ==
In 2005, a new residence hall at U.C. Berkeley was named after Colonel Towle (Katherine A. Towle Hall).

== Awards ==
- Legion of Merit
- Navy Commendation Medal
- American Campaign Medal
- World War Two Victory Medal
- National Defense Service Medal
- Navy Commendation Medal (originally known as the Navy Commendation)

=== Navy Commendation Medal Citation ===
THE SECRETARY OF THE NAVY WASHINGTON The Secretary of the Navy takes pleasure in commending LIEUTENANT COLONEL KATHERINE A. TOWLE, UNITED STATES MARINE CORPS WOMEN'S RESERVE, for service as set forth in the following

CITATION: "For meritorious service during the entire period of the growth and development of the United States Marine Corps Women's Reserve. She was at once placed in a position of responsibility and succeeding assignments have broadened her field of usefulness. She has constantly demonstrated superior qualities of judgment, tact and leadership and has commanded the respect and confidence of her colleagues. By her outstanding performance of duty, Lieutenant Colonel Towle has contributed greatly to the development of the Marine Corps Women's Reserve. Her conduct was in keeping with the highest traditions of the United States Naval Service."

A copy of this citation has been made a part of Lieutenant Colonel Towle's official record and she is hereby authorized to wear the Commendation Ribbon. /s/ JAMES FORRESTAL Secretary of the Navy OFFICIAL COPY [1945]

== See also ==
- Free Speech Movement
- SLATE

Preceded by Ruth Cheney Streeter	Director of the USMC Women's Reserve; 1945—1946	Succeeded by Julia E. Hamblet

Preceded by none	Director of Women Marines; 1948—1953	Succeeded by Julia E. Hamblet
