= Anne A. Lentz =

American commissioned officer

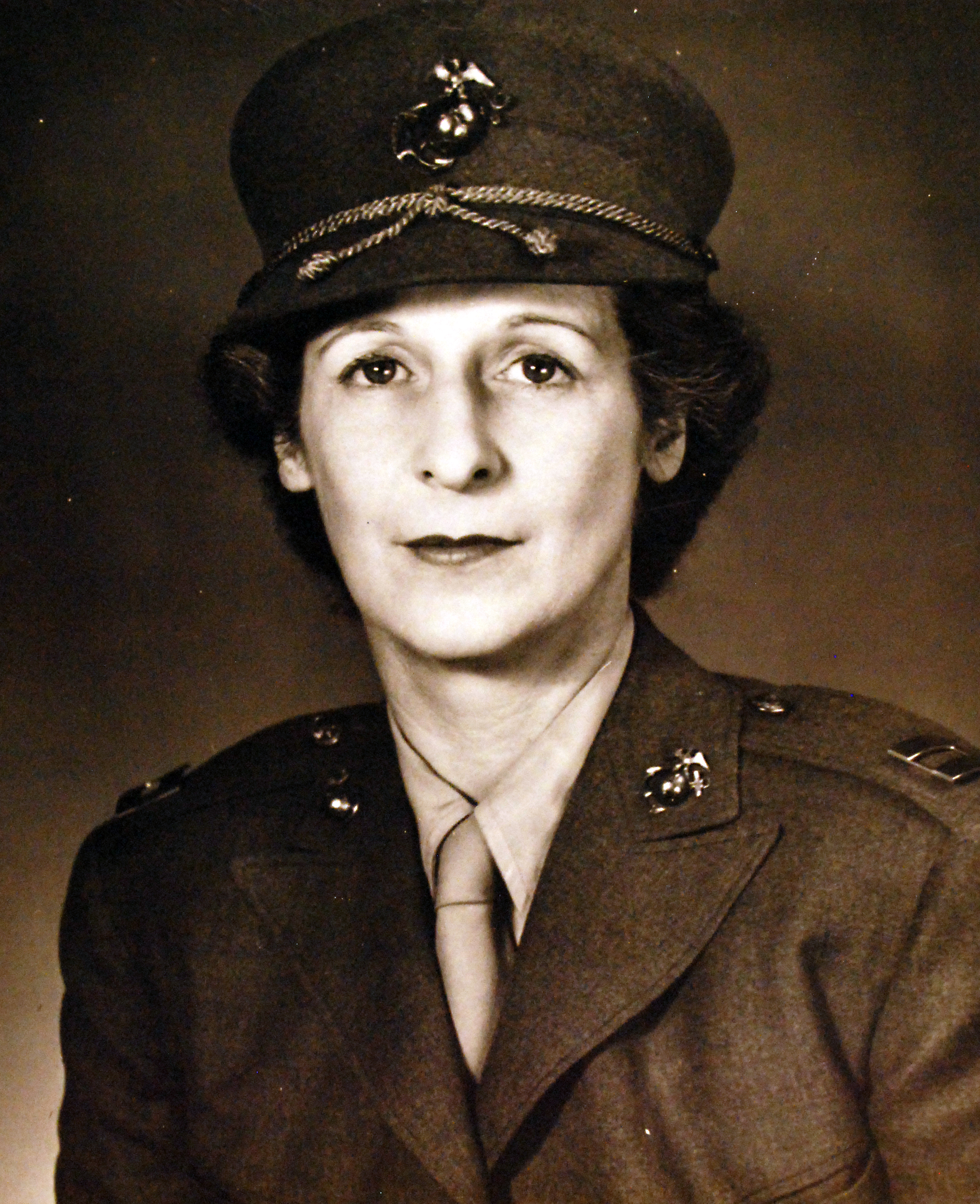
Captain Anne A. Lentz, U.S. Marine Corps Women’s Reserve, March 1943. Official U.S. Navy photograph

Anne Adams Lentz was the first commissioned officer in the Marine Corps Women’s Reserve (MCWR). In early 1942, Lentz was hired by the War Department to help design uniforms for the brand new Women's Army Auxiliary Corps. The WAACs were using old stocks of uniforms designed for men and were not suited for women. She would still be working for the War Department in December 1942 when she was assigned to the Marine Corps for a period of 30-days to help the new Marine Corps Women's Reserve design their uniforms.

Lentz had been a designer of school uniforms for a large New York department store when the WAACs hired her. The Commandant of the Marine Corps, Gen. Thomas Holcomb, was insistent that the women's reserve would wear the same traditional forest green uniform with red chevrons that male Marines wore.

Lentz was married to Army Brigadier General John M. Lentz who was stationed at the Army Ground Forces Headquarters in Washington.

On 15 January 1943, Lentz was sworn in by her husband as a Marine Reserve captain and the first commissioned officer in the MCWR. By June 1943 she was leading the Women's Reserve Section of the Uniform Unit at Marine Corps Headquarters. Quickly after that a Marine Corps Women's Reserve Uniform Board was established by the Commandant. Uniform regulations were issued in August 1943.

The uniforms established by Lentz would remain mostly unchanged until 1952. The goal of the uniforms was that they mirror the male Marines uniform, but be infused with tailored femininity. Lentz's uniforms had to be flexible enough to be used by aerial gunnery instructors, parachute riggers, drivers, auto mechanics, cryptographers as well as cooks and bakers. The uniforms included a forest green Winter Service Uniform, officer's Winter Dress Uniform, a two-piece seer-sucker green and white Summer Service Uniform, a short sleeved white Summer Dress Uniform, an officer's Summer Dress Uniform and a cotton bib olive-drab utility work uniform.

The uniforms would inspire Elizabeth Arden to introduce a lipstick known as Montezuma Red.

== In popular media ==
Nearly all of the uniforms created by Lentz's unit can be seen worn by Sergeant Lena Riggi (Basilone) played by Annie Parisse in Part Eight of the miniseries The Pacific.
