= Ruth Cheney Streeter =

American military officer (1895–1990)

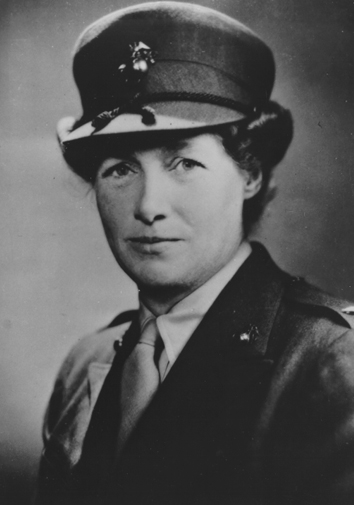
- Cheney Streeter in 1945
- Born: Ruth Cheney; October 2, 1895; Brookline, Massachusetts, U.S.
- Died: September 30, 1990 (aged 94); Morristown, New Jersey, U.S.
- Burial place: Peterborough, New Hampshire
- Military career
- Allegiance: United States of America
- Branch: United States Marine Corps
- Service years: 1943–1945
- Rank: Colonel
- Commands: United States Marine Corps Women's Reserve
- Conflicts: World War II
- Awards: Legion of Merit

Ruth Cheney Streeter (October 2, 1895 – September 30, 1990) was an American military officer who was the first director of the United States Marine Corps Women's Reserve (USMCWR). In 1943, she became the first woman to attain the rank of major in the United States Marine Corps when she was commissioned as a major on January 29, 1943. She retired in 1945 as a lieutenant colonel.

== Life and military career ==
Born Ruth Cheney on October 2, 1895, in Brookline, Massachusetts. She graduated from Bryn Mawr College in 1918.

On June 23, 1917, she married Thomas W. Streeter; they went on to have four children. They lived in Morristown, New Jersey, where she was involved in civic affairs, and served as the first woman president of the Morris County, New Jersey Welfare Board.

At the age of 47, Streeter earned her commercial pilot's license, with the intention of joining either the WAVES or the Women Airforce Service Pilots (WASPS) as a ferry pilot in the war effort. After being rejected five times by the WASPS on account of her age, however, Streeter chose to give up flying altogether, and instead joined the United States Marine Corps Women's Reserve. On January 29, 1943, she was commissioned as a major and appointed director of the United States Marine Corps Women's Reserve. She was in office on the official creation date of MCWR on February 13, 1943. She was promoted to lieutenant colonel later that year, and breveted to full colonel in 1944. She resigned her commission on December 6, 1945. During Streeter's tenure, the Women's Reserve grew to a size of 831 officers and 17,714 enlisted.

On October 31, 1945 she was awarded the Legion of Merit. The accompanying citation states in part:

For exceptionally meritorious conduct in the performance of outstanding services while Director of the Marine Corps Women's Reserve from February 13, 1943 to the present time. Appointed as Director of the Women's Reserve which was non-existent, Colonel Streeter by her energy, force, tact, graciousness and superior judgment, planned and organized the Women's Reserve, a branch of the Marine Corps consisting of some nineteen thousand women, which has proven to the satisfaction of all to have made a most valuable contribution to the part marines have taken in the winning of the war. Her courage and fortitude in the early days of formation of the Women's Reserve and their first replacement of men for combat overcame the doubts of many and the reluctance to admit that women had a place in a military organization. She and the organization which she has so ably directed have attained a degree of efficiency second to none. Today this component part of the Marine Corps has the admiration and respect of the entire Marine Corps and of the whole nation. Her conduct throughout has been in keeping with the highest traditions of the United States Naval Service.

In addition to the Legion of Merit, Streeter was also awarded the American Campaign Medal and the World War II Victory Medal.

In 1947, she was appointed as a member of the New Jersey Constitutional Convention.

Streeter died of congestive heart failure on September 30, 1990, in Morristown, New Jersey. She is buried in Peterborough, New Hampshire.

== See also ==
- Katherine Amelia Towle, 2nd Director of the USMC Women's Reserve (1945–1946) and 1st Director of Women Marines
- Margaret A. Brewer, 6th and final director of Women Marines, who was the first woman to become a general in the Marine Corps
- Caroline Rose Foster, Morristown farmer and philanthropist, who was a friend of Ruth Streeter
- Cheney Award, established by Ruth and her mother to honor her brother who was killed in WWI

Preceded by none	Director of United States Marine Corps Women's Reserve; 1943–1945	Succeeded by Katherine Amelia Towle
