= United States Marine Corps Women's Reserve =

World War II U.S. military organization

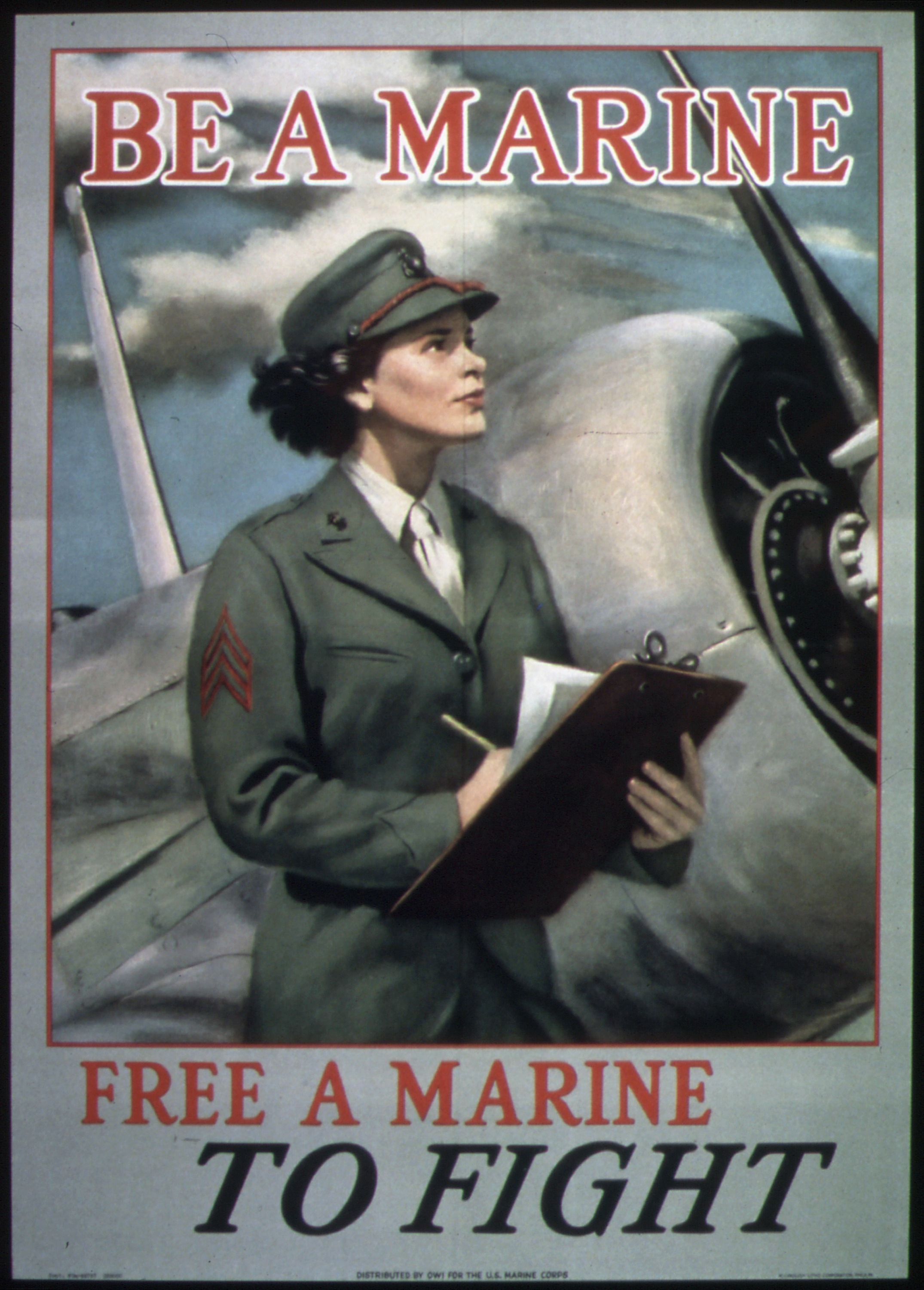
A Marine Corps Women's Reserve recruiting poster during World War II

United States Marine Corps Women's Reserve (USMCWR) was the World War II women's branch of the United States Marine Corps Reserve. It was authorized by the U.S. Congress and signed into law by President Franklin D. Roosevelt on July 30, 1942. Its purpose was to release officers and men for combat, and to replace them with women in U.S. shore stations for the duration of the war plus six months. Ruth Cheney Streeter was appointed the first director. The USMCWR did not have an official nickname as did the other World War II women's military services.

Young women were keen on serving in the military during World War II, and the Marine Corps desired only the best. The standards set for women who wished to volunteer for the Reserve were demanding. However, the Reserve did not accept African American or Japanese American women during World War II, but they did accept Native American women. The officer candidates first trained at the Navy's Midshipmen School for women officers at Mount Holyoke College in South Hadley, Massachusetts. The initial training site for the enlisted women was at the Naval Training School at Hunter College in the Bronx, New York City. In due course, the Marine Corps discovered the advantages of having its own training centers. Following this, on July 1, 1943, all Reserve training was shifted to Camp Lejeune, North Carolina. The members served at shore and air stations across the continental United States. The incorporated territory of Hawaii was the only overseas duty station where members were assigned. They served in occupations classified as professional, semi-professional, clerical, skilled trades, services, and sales. The peak strength of the Reserve was about 19,000. With the end of World War II in sight, the corps began to demobilize the members. By December 1945, the Reserve was down to 12,300, and by August 1946 it had about 300 members.

Early on, the male members of the Marine Corps subjected the women to a degree of resentment and crude language. The women overcame these indignities with their accomplishments in the workplace and the poise with which they performed. In time, most of their detractors became their supporters. For her stewardship of the Reserve, the Marine Corps presented Ruth Cheney Streeter with the Legion of Merit. On the occasion of the first anniversary of its establishment, the Reserve received a message from President Franklin D. Roosevelt in which he observed, "You have quickly and efficiently taken over scores of different kinds of duties that not long ago were considered strictly masculine assignments, and in doing so, you have freed a large number of well trained, battle ready men of the corps for action." Initially, General Thomas Holcomb, Commandant of the U.S. Marine Corps, had been opposed to having women serve in the Marine Corps. Before the end of 1943, however, he reversed himself, saying, "Like most Marines, when the matter first came up I didn't believe women could serve any useful purpose in the Marine Corps ... Since then I've changed my mind."

== Background ==
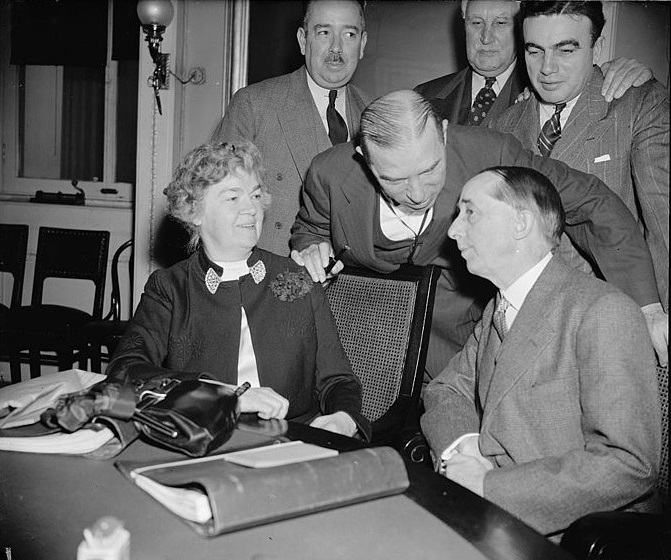
Representative Edith Nourse Rogers of Massachusetts pictured with other representatives in 1939.

At the outbreak of World War II, the notion of women serving in the Navy or Marine Corps (both under the jurisdiction of the Department of the Navy) was not widely supported by the Congress or by the branches of the military services. Nevertheless, some believed that women would eventually be needed in the military. The most notable was Edith Nourse Rogers, Representative of Massachusetts, and Eleanor Roosevelt, wife of the president, who helped pave the way for its reality. When President Franklin D. Roosevelt signed what would become Public Law 689 on July 30, 1942, it established a Women's Reserve as a branch of the Naval Reserve for the Navy and Marine Corps. The idea behind the law was to free up officers and men for combat, with women standing in for them at shore stations on the home front. Women could now serve in the Reserve as an officer or at an enlisted level, with ranks or ratings consistent with those of men. Reserve volunteers could only serve for the duration of the war, plus six months.

The Marine Corps delayed formation of the Reserve until February 13, 1943. It was the last service branch to accept women into its ranks, and there was considerable unhappiness about making the Marine Corps anything but a club for white men. In fact, General Thomas Holcomb, Commandant of the Marine Corps, was a well-known opponent of women serving in the corps. By the end of 1943, however, he had reversed himself, saying, "there's hardly any work at our Marine stations that women can't do as well as men. They do some work far better than men. ... What is more, they're real Marines. They don't have a nickname, and they don't need one." Holcomb rejected all acronyms or monikers for the Reserve; he did not believe they were compulsory. Despite Holcomb's dislike for nicknames, several of them surfaced for the Reserve, including: Femarines, WAMS, BAMS, Dainty Devil-Dogs, Glamarines, Women's Leatherneck-Aides, MARS, and Sub-Marines. By the summer of 1943, attempts to pressure the Reserve into a nickname had diminished. "WR" was as far as Holcomb would move in that direction.

== Leadership ==
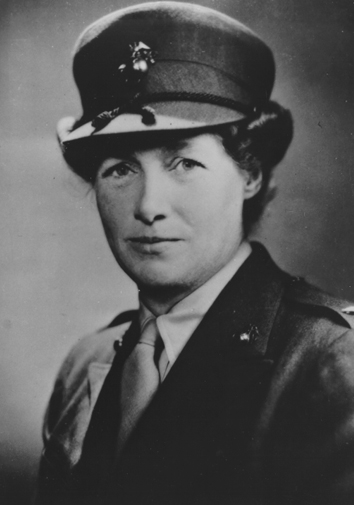
Ruth Cheney Streeter, the first director of the Marine Corps Women's Reserve during World War II

Ruth Cheney Streeter was named the first director of the Reserve; commissioned a major and sworn in by the Secretary of the Navy on January 29, 1943. A year later, Streeter was promoted to colonel. She was not the first woman to see active duty in the Marine Corps during World War II. Weeks earlier, Mrs. Anne A. Lentz, a civilian clothing expert who had helped design the Reserve uniforms, was commissioned a captain. Lentz came to the corps on a 30-day assignment from the Women's Army Auxiliary Corps (WAAC) and stayed on.

Streeter was born in Brookline, Massachusetts, in 1895 and attended Bryn Mawr College for two years. She was the wife of a prominent (Morristown, NJ) lawyer and businessman, and the mother of four children, three sons in the military during World War II, and one younger daughter. Although Streeter had 20 years' of active civic work, she had never held a paying job. She was selected from a field of twelve outstanding women, all recommended to the corps by Dean Virginia C. Gildersleeve of Barnard College, who had earlier recommended Mildred McAfee for the director of the Women Accepted for Volunteer Emergency Service (WAVES). Streeter was 47 years of age when selected to head the Reserve. In the Free a Marine to Fight publication, Colonel Mary V. Stremlow (Ret. MCWR) described her as confident, spirited, patriotic, and a principled person. In 1940, Streeter believed the United States would be drawn into World War II. Intending to be part of the war effort, she learned to fly and earned a commercial pilot's license. She then purchased a small airplane, and in the summer of 1941 joined the Civil Air Patrol. Her plane was used to fly missions, Streeter recalled, but she was unhappy, relegated to doing "all the dirty work". Then, when the Women Airforce Service Pilots (WASP) was formed, though Streeter was twelve years over the age limit, she applied five times and was rejected five times. In January 1943, when she inquired about service with the WAVES, she was told that flying was out of the question, but that she could be a ground instructor. Streeter turned it down, and a month later became the director of the Reserve. During her tenure as the director, she sent an open letter to all women recruits, saying, "It is not easy to Free a Marine to Fight (a recruiting slogan of the Reserve). It takes courage – the courage to embark on a new and an alien way of life ... Your spirit is a source of constant inspiration to all who work with you."

Colonel Streeter resigned her commission from the Reserve on December 7, 1945. (She was replaced by Lieutenant Colonel Katherine A. Towle.) A few months later, the Marine Corps presented Streeter with the Legion of Merit. It was the highest award ever made to a woman marine as a result of World War II service. The Marine Corps also dedicated the headquarters building of the Fourth Recruit Training Battalion at Parris Island, South Carolina, to her. Streeter died on September 9, 1990, two days before her 95th birthday.

== Recruiting ==
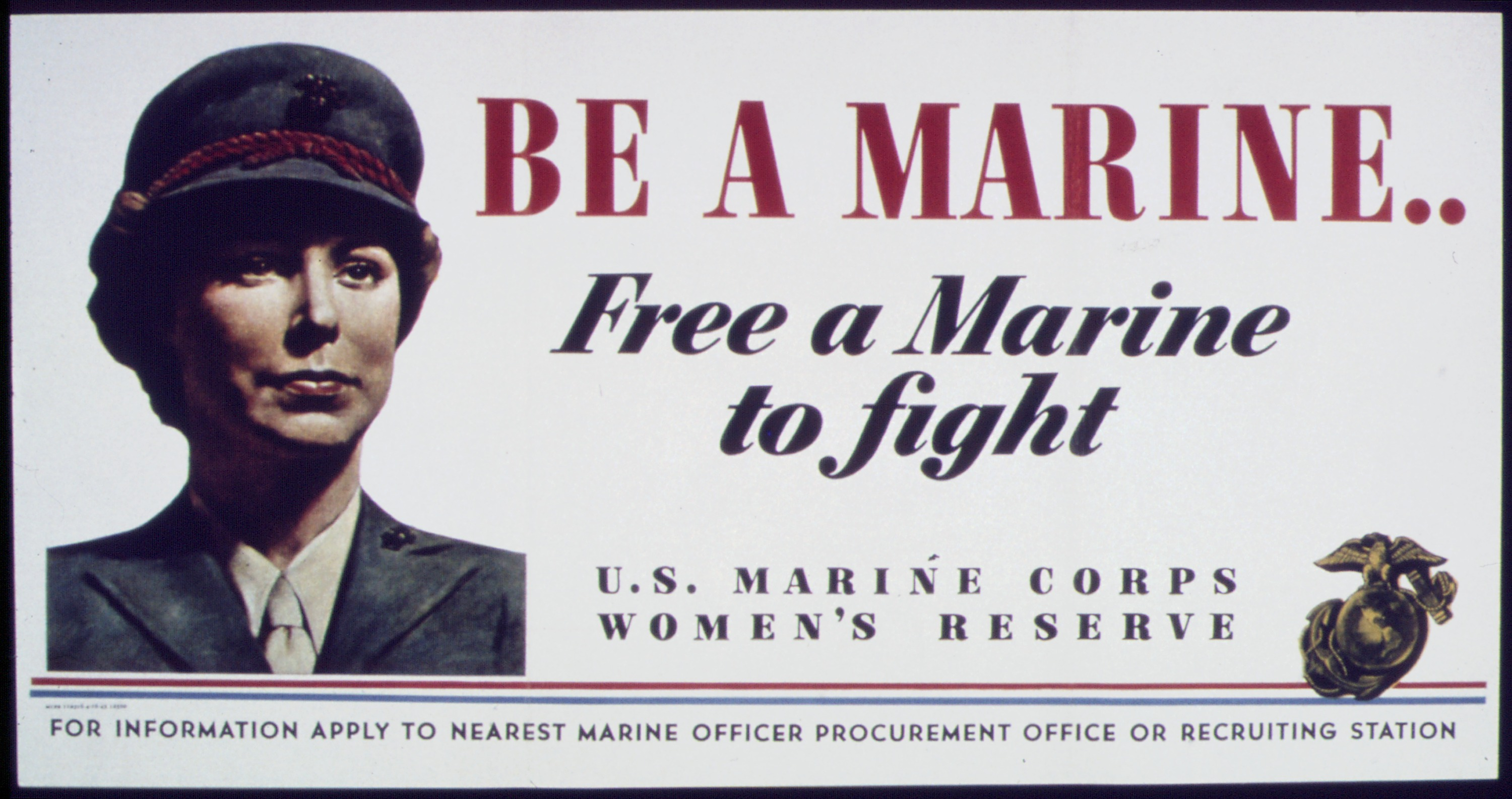
A Marine Corps Women's Reserve recruiting poster during World War II

The qualifications for women who wished to become members of the Reserve were stringent. The eligibility requirements for officer candidates and enlisted women were similar: United States citizenship; not married to a marine; either single or married but with no children under 18; height not less than 60 in (150 cm); weight not less than 95 lb (43 kg); good vision and good teeth. For enlisted members, the age limits were from 20 to 35, and an applicant was required to have at least two years' of high school. For officer candidates, the age limits were from 20 to 49, and they had to either be a college graduate, or have a combination of two years' of college and two years' of work experience. Later, the wives of enlisted Marines were allowed to join, and enlisted women could marry after boot camp.

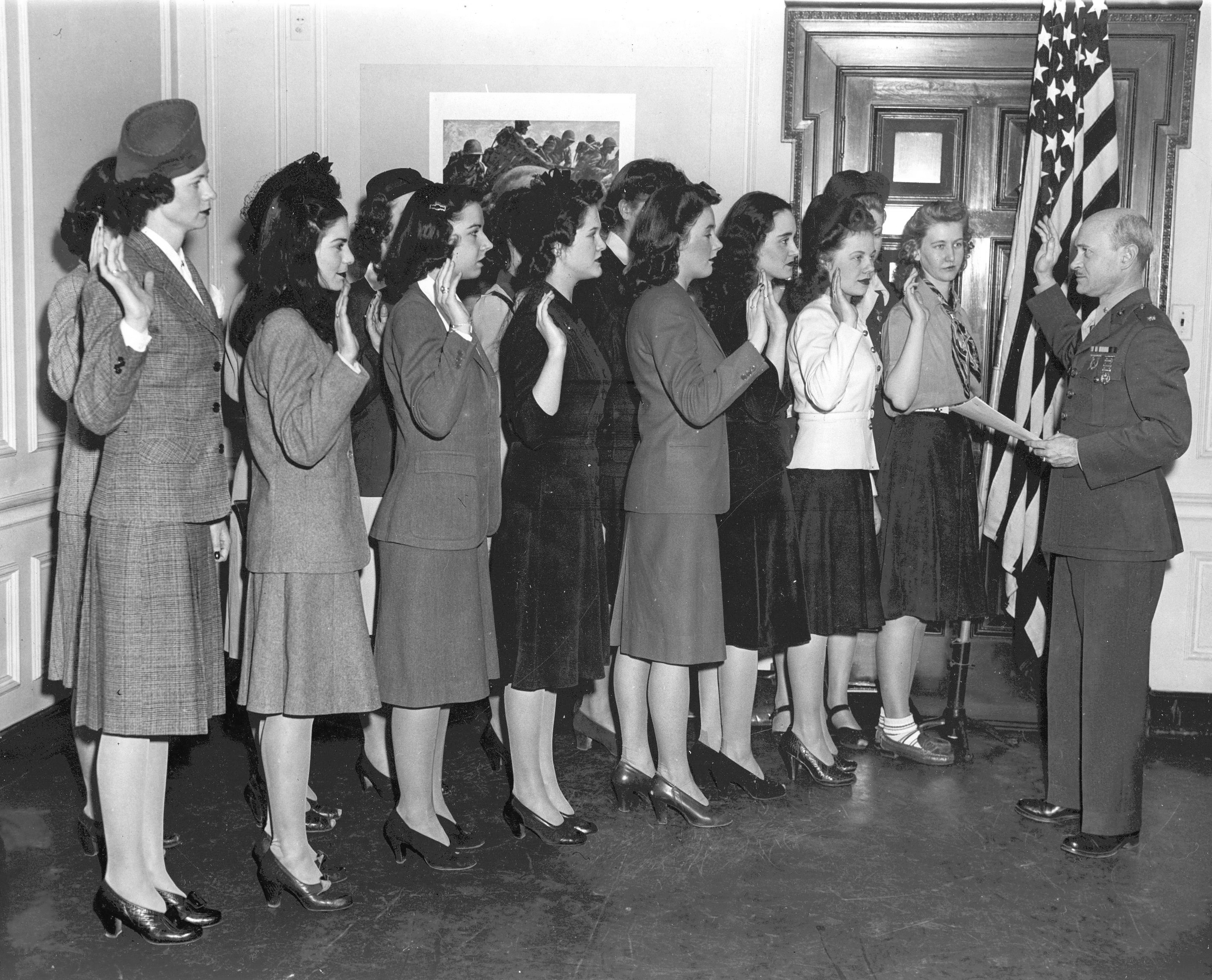
Women enlistees being sworn into the Marine Corps Women's Reserve in the New York area, 1943. Official USMC photograph.

By way of agreement, the Navy and the Marine Corps designated the Navy's procurement offices as recruiting centers for both the WAVES and the Reserve. This helped to avoid competition in the recruiting of women for either naval service. Women applicants for either service would go to one office to enlist and to receive physical examinations. (Later on, the Reserve established its own recruiting capability.) When reservations surfaced about whether male Marine recruiters could properly select female applicants for the Reserve, the call went out for women recruiters. Nineteen WAVE officer candidates volunteered; they were transferred and assigned to procurement offices. Still in WAVE uniforms, they began recruiting the first members of the Reserve. Lucile E. McClarren of Nemacolin, Pennsylvania, appears to have been the first enlisted woman recruited on February 13, 1943. The Reserve did not accept African American or Japanese American women. The first Native American woman to enlist in the Reserve was Minnie Spotted-Wolf of Heart Butte, Montana; she did so in July 1943. Early recruiting was brisk, so much so that in some cases women were sworn in and put to work in procurement offices, delaying their training until later.

The slogan "Free a Marine to Fight" proved to be a strong drawing card for the Reserve, stronger than any fashioned by the WAC, WAVES, or SPARS. Young women were eager to serve in the military during World War II, often in defiance of their family's wishes. Marian Bauer's parents were so upset when she joined the corps that they did not see her off. Jane Taylor's father, a World War I veteran, gave her this advice: "Don't ever complain to me. You're doing this of your own free will. You weren't drafted or forced. Now, go – learn, travel, and do your job to the best of your ability." There were those parents who asked for special consideration for daughters who were too young to enlist. The minimum age of 20 years, set by law, remained the same throughout the war for the Reserve. Some parents wondered why 18-year-boys were sent into combat, and 18-year-old girls could not serve. The Corps' recruiting scheme of forming platoons of about 40 women each to be recruited from the same area and sending them as a unit to Reserve training together caught on quickly. The first platoon was from Philadelphia, Pennsylvania, then Washington, D.C., and Pittsburgh, Pennsylvania, followed by Albany, Buffalo, and Central New York; Johnstown and Fayette County, Pennsylvania; Dallas and Houston, Texas; Miami, Florida; Saint Paul, Minnesota; Green Bay, Wisconsin; the state of Alabama; and northern and southern New England.

Aside from patriotism, Colonel Streeter was interested to learn the reasons why young women joined the Reserve. A survey of 1,000 new enlistees was conducted at Camp Lejeune, North Carolina, which asked this question. The results of this survey showed that 750 enlistees had had positive reasons for enlisting. Some had male relatives or friends in the armed forces, and some wanted revenge against the enemy, while others wanted the experience it would bring to their lives. The remaining 250 acknowledged they were trying to escape from something: a bad home life, a broken marriage, boredom, or some personal disappointment. Indications were that Streeter was not displeased with the findings. The Reserve met its recruitment goal by June 1, 1944 and then stopped all recruiting. It began again on September 20, 1944, but on a limited basis. Its peak strength was approximately 19,000 officers and enlisted women.

The first group of six officers recruited was given direct commissions in the Reserve. They were recruited for their abilities and civilian experiences, considered key to the success of the fledgling program. Assignments were: public relations, First Lieutenant E. Louise Stewart; training, Captain Charlotte D. Gower; classification and detail, Captain Cornelia D. T. Williams; West Coast activities, Captain Lillian O'Malley Daly (who had been a marine in WWI); Recruit Depot, Captain Katherine Towle; and Assistant to the Director, Captain Helen C. O'Neill. These women were assigned to active duty immediately, without any military training or formal indoctrination in the corps.

To capitalize on the enlisted women's experience, commission status was open to them beginning in July 1943. To be eligible, the applicant had to have completed six months' of service, be recommended by her commanding officer, and be selected by a board of male and female officers. After October 1943, the majority of women officers came from the ranks; only civilian women with specialized skills or exceptional leadership qualities were accepted for officer training.

== Uniforms ==
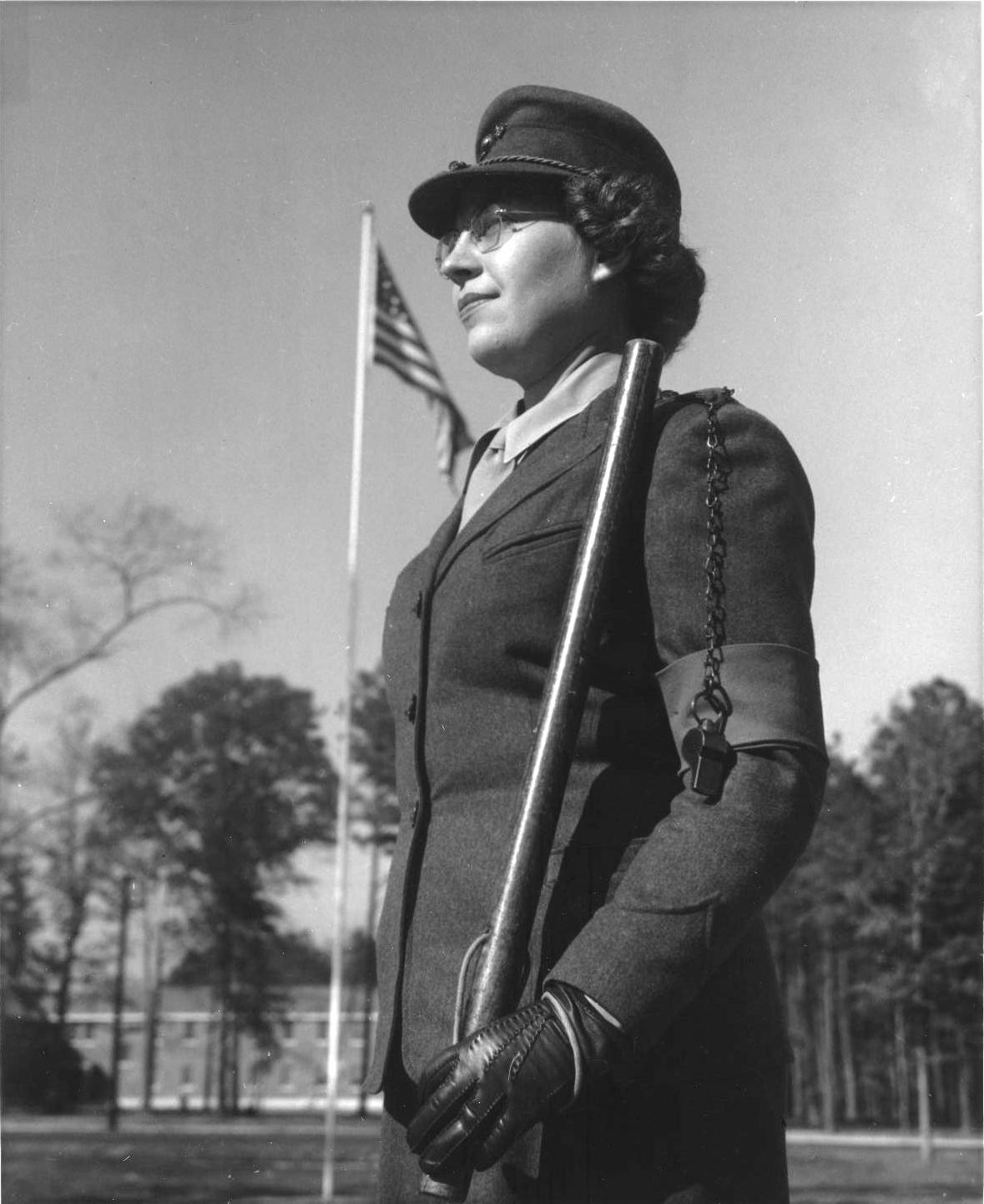
In her winter uniform, Private Eleanora Julia Csanady stands sentry duty at Camp Lejeune, North Carolina, in 1943. Official USMC photograph.

The uniforms of the Reserve were a matter of importance to the Marine Corps, so much so that a circular released in late 1943 stated the following:

The Marine Corps wants you to look your best at all times. The uniforms you will wear have been designed to be comfortable, practical and extremely attractive. When you don them you will know the pride of wearing a uniform that is a symbol of valor and bravery everywhere.

Reserve recruits were promised uniforms upon reaching boot camp, but that was not always the case. In fact, during the summer of 1943, some recruits had to train in civilian clothing until summer uniforms were available. When the new uniforms arrived, they turned out to be winter uniforms instead of the summer uniforms expected. The seersucker summer uniforms had yet to be designed. Disputes about fabric, cut, and production had a delaying effect upon delivery. In time, these issues were resolved, and most Reserve members felt their uniforms were much better looking than those of the other women's military organizations.

The winter uniform for both Reserve officers and enlisted members resembled the men's uniform in some respects. It was a forest green and consisted of a skirt, no higher than the bottom of the kneecap, an unbelted jacket with three bronze buttons, and a green cap trimmed with a scarlet cord. Marine Corps emblems were placed on the cap and the uniform lapels; scarlet chevrons were sewn on the jacket's sleeves. Under the jacket, a khaki shirt and matching field scarf were worn. Added to the ensemble were dark brown gloves, shoulder bag, and shoes. For inclement weather, there was a green overcoat or a khaki trench coat, a red muffler, and black boots, or rubbers. Neither officers nor enlisted members had winter dress uniforms. However, officers were able to modify their winter service uniform into a dress uniform by substituting a white shirt and forest green tie in place of the regular khaki. The enlisted members were without such freedom.

The summer uniform was a two-piece green and white outfit made of washable seersucker material. It had two pieces, a skirt and a short-sleeve jacket with a V-neck. The cap was green and decorated with a white cord, buttons were white, chevrons green, and emblems bronze. The shoes were brown, the gloves white, and the handbags light green. The summer dress uniform was made of white twill. It had short sleeves and a V-neck, worn with gilt buttons on the jacket and cap, with dress emblems and white pumps. The officers could choose between three summer dress uniforms. The first was the white one worn by enlisted women, but with added green shoulder straps. The other two were made of white twill or a similar material. One was a short-sleeve blouse, and the other was long sleeved and collarless.

Slacks of covert material were worn for certain duties, although the most common work uniform was the olive-drab, cotton utility outfit, worn with high topped shoes. The trousers had a bib-front and crossed straps, and were worn over a short sleeve, matching shirt, and topped by a long-sleeve jacket. For recreation, field nights, and physical conditioning, women Marines wore the peanut suit, so named because of its colored appearance. It was a tan, seersucker, one-piece bloomer outfit, with ties at the bottom of the shorts. In keeping with the propriety of the times, the women covered their legs with a front-buttoned A-line skirt when not actively engaged in sports, exercises, or work details.

== Training ==
=== Mount Holyoke College ===
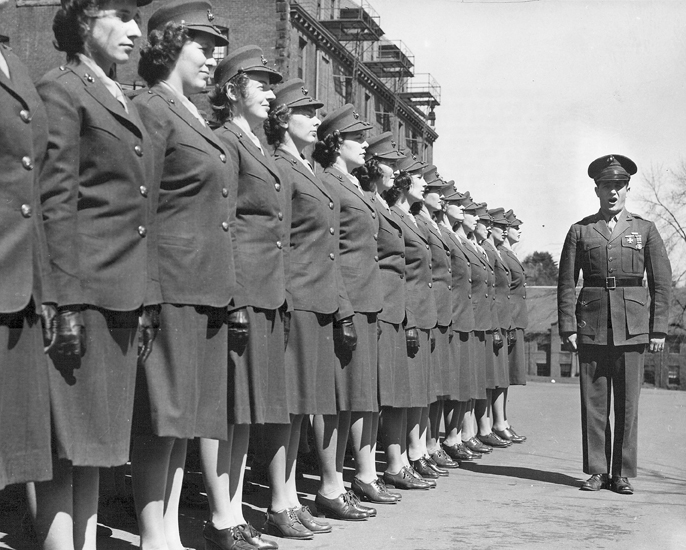
First group of Marine Corps Women's Reserve officer candidates arrive at Mount Holyoke College in 1943. Official USMC photograph.

The Reserve officer candidates trained at Mount Holyoke College in South Hadley, Massachusetts, a branch of the Navy's Midshipmen's School for women officers at Smith College in Northampton, Massachusetts. On March 13, 1943, the first group of 71 officer candidates arrived at the Midshipmen's School, Mount Holyoke College. Officer candidates joined as privates and after four weeks, if successful, became officer cadets. Those who did not meet the requirements had two choices: transfer to enlisted basic training or await discharge. Cadets who completed the eight-week course but were not recommended for a commission were asked to resign. They were eventually discharged and allowed to join the enlisted ranks. The curriculum for officer candidates was the same as for the WAVES, except for drill. This was taught by male Marine drill instructors (non-commissioned officers who provided instruction and indoctrination for officer candidates and enlisted recruits), who were openly hostile to the women because they had become part of the formerly all-male Marine Corps. Candidates studied the following naval subjects: organization; administration; personnel; history; strategy; law; justice; ships and aircraft. The second part of the training was specifically on Marine Corps subjects taught by male Marines. It included the following: administration; courtesy; map reading; interior guard (to preserve order, protect property, and enforce regulations within the command); safeguarding military information; and physical conditioning. On May 4, 1943, members of the first class received their commissions in the Marine Corps. A total of 214 women officers completed training at Mount Holyoke College.

=== Hunter College ===
Shortly after the first officer class reported to Mount Holyoke College, enlisted women of the Reserve were ordered to the US Naval Training School at Hunter College in the Bronx, New York City. 722 recruits arrived for training between March 24 and 26. On March 26, 21 platoons of women began training with the WAVES and graduated on April 25, 1943. Because the school was designated for WAVE instruction, the curriculum was geared for the Navy. Some subjects were not relevant for Marines, so modifications were made and male Marine drill instructors were added to the staff. The training sessions included: drill; physical training; customs; courtesies; history; organization; administration; naval law; map reading; defense against air attack; identification of aircraft, and safeguarding military information. In the process, the male marines did not hide their resentment toward the women for being a part of the corps. Between March and July, 3,346 women trained at Hunter College, 3,280 of whom graduated.

=== Camp Lejeune ===
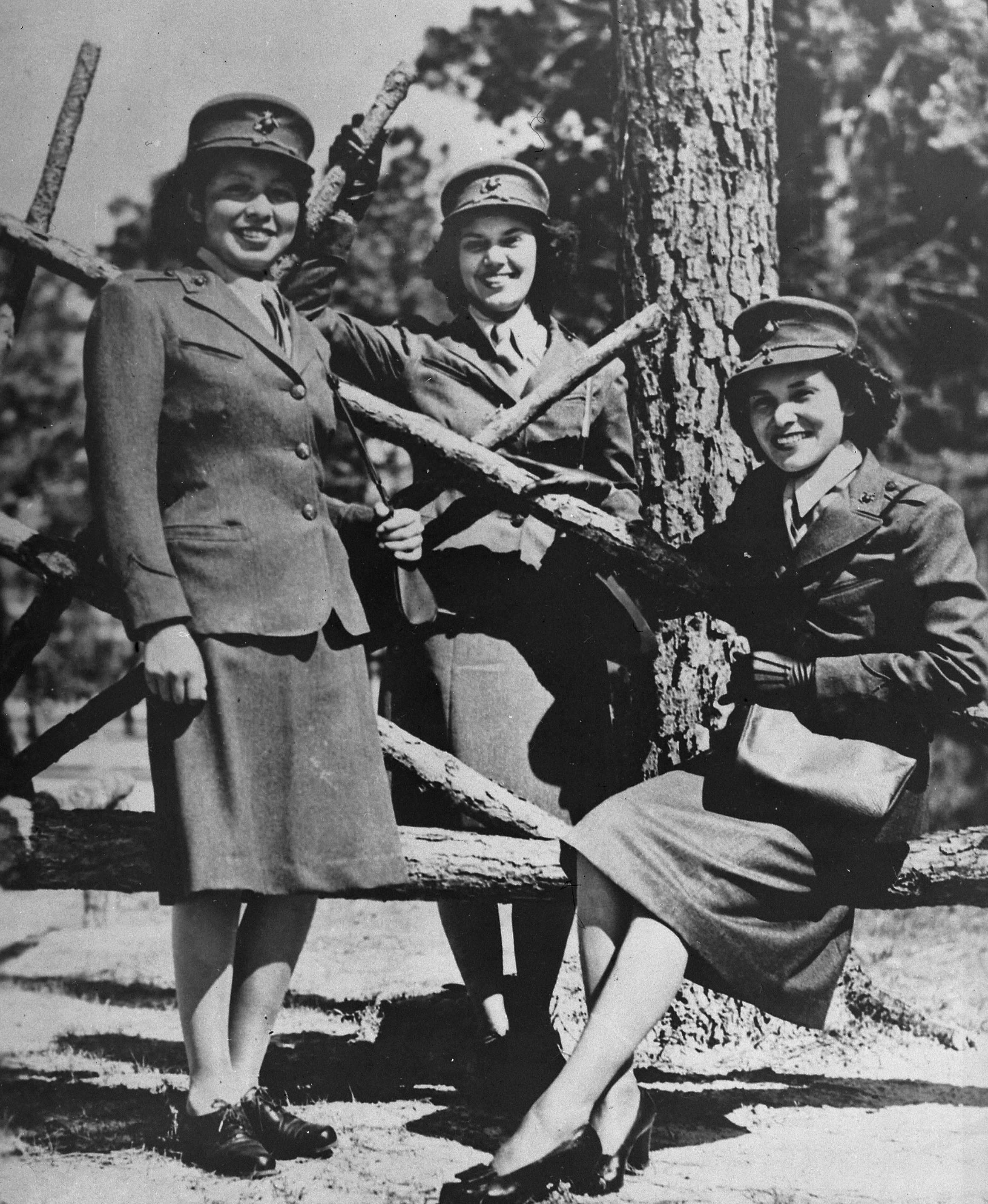
Three Native American Marine Corps Women's Reserve members, Camp Lejeune, North Carolina. Left to right: Minnie Spotted-Wolf (Blackfoot), Celia Mix (Potawatomi), and Viola Eastman (Chippewa) on October 16, 1943.

Originally, the Marine Corps planned to use existing Navy facilities for all of the Reserve training, but it soon realized the advantage of having its own training schools. Although joint training with the Navy proved satisfactory, it did not engender the Marine esprit de corps that was expected. Consequently, Marine Headquarters decided to consolidate all Reserve training at Camp Lejeune, North Carolina. The Marine Corps opened its own schools for officer candidates and recruit training at Camp Lejeune in July 1943, under the command of Colonel John M. Arthur. Officer candidates and recruits in training at Navy facilities were transferred to Camp Lejeune, where over 15,000 women became Marines during the remainder of World War II. The new camp was named for John A. Lejeune (1867–1942), a distinguished Marine officer. The 200-square-mile (520 km^{2}) area was completed in 1943, with a headquarters building and facilities for transient and permanent Marine Corps personnel. At Lejeune, the curriculum for both officer candidates and enlisted recruits moved beyond classroom lectures on combat weapons to actual weapon demonstrations. Reserve personnel observed demonstrations in hand-to-hand combat, use of mortars, bazookas, flame-throwers, an assortment of guns, and landing craft. However, they were not trained to use these weapons themselves.

Leaving the college campuses for the Camp Lejeune training center was a change, but it introduced the officer candidates and recruits to the real Marine Corps military environment. What did not change from the time at Mount Holyoke and Hunter was the hostile behavior of the drill instructors towards the women. At Lejeune they did not try to hide their resentment, often referring to the women as BAMS (Broad Assed Marines) and using other crude references. In the early days of the Reserve, the women were subjected to considerable verbal and psychological abuse. This took a toll on the Reserve and its director, causing General Holcomb (Commandant of the Marine Corps) to take steps to end it. In time, the open hostilities subsided, and before long the women's competence, self-assurance, sharp appearance, and pride won over most of their detractors.

== Assignments ==
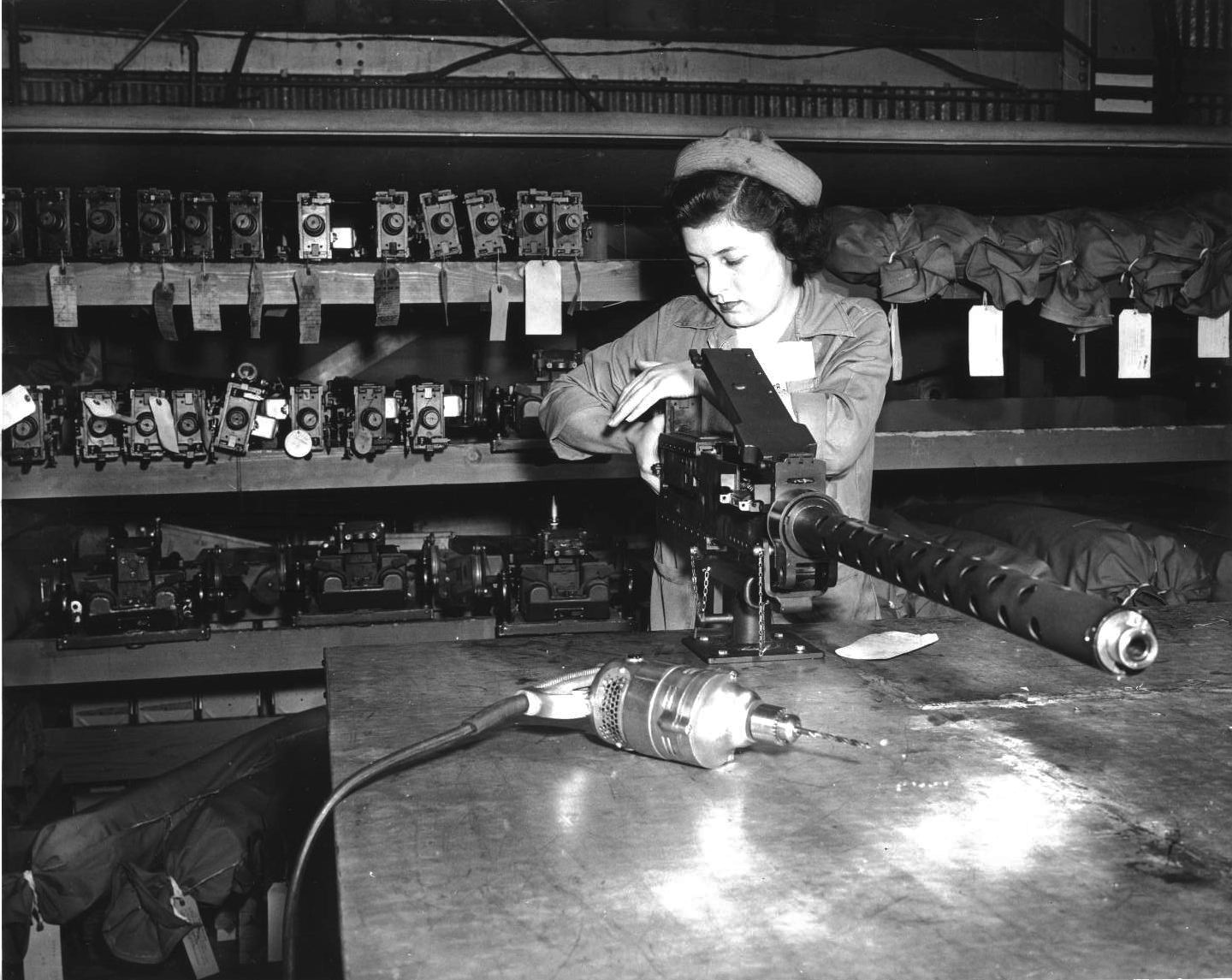
Private Marion Pillsbury assembles a .30 caliber machine gun at the Marine Corps Base at San Diego, California, during World War II. Official USMC photograph

Assigning jobs in occupations that women had never held before was a daunting task for placement personnel. By social custom, working women did not work in the trades and they rarely supervised men. Women had worked mainly in offices, classrooms, hospitals, retail stores, libraries, and beauty shops. In 1943, Marine Corps manpower was in short supply, but members of the Reserve were available to pick up the slack. However, the corps had to select, train, classify, and assign the women to jobs where they could contribute and do so in the shortest amount of time. After completing their Marine Corps basic training, selected women received advanced schooling in a variety of specialties. By the end of the war, 9,641 members of the Reserve had attended more than 30 specialist schools run by higher educational institutions and departments of the U.S. military. Colonel Streeter's philosophy was to let them try anything, except heavy lifting and combat. The Reserve strength on June 1, 1945 was 17,672, of which 1,342 were engaged in occupations classified as professional or semi-professional; 10,279 in clerical; 741 in sales; 587 in services; 344 in skilled trades; 1,305 as semi-skilled; 14 as unskilled; 35 as students; and six unaccounted for. Marine Corps recruiting literature indicated there were over 200 types of jobs available in the Reserve. While this may have been correct, the fact was that well over half the women were assigned to and worked in clerical fields. The first duty posts and stations for the Reserve included places such as Washington, D.C.; New York; Philadelphia; Chicago; San Diego; and Quantico, Virginia. Marine aviation was the fastest-growing unit of the Corps. Both officers and enlisted women served at Marine Corps Air Stations including Cherry Point and Edenton, North Carolina; Parris Island, South Carolina; El Centro, El Toro, Mojave, and Santa Barbara, California.

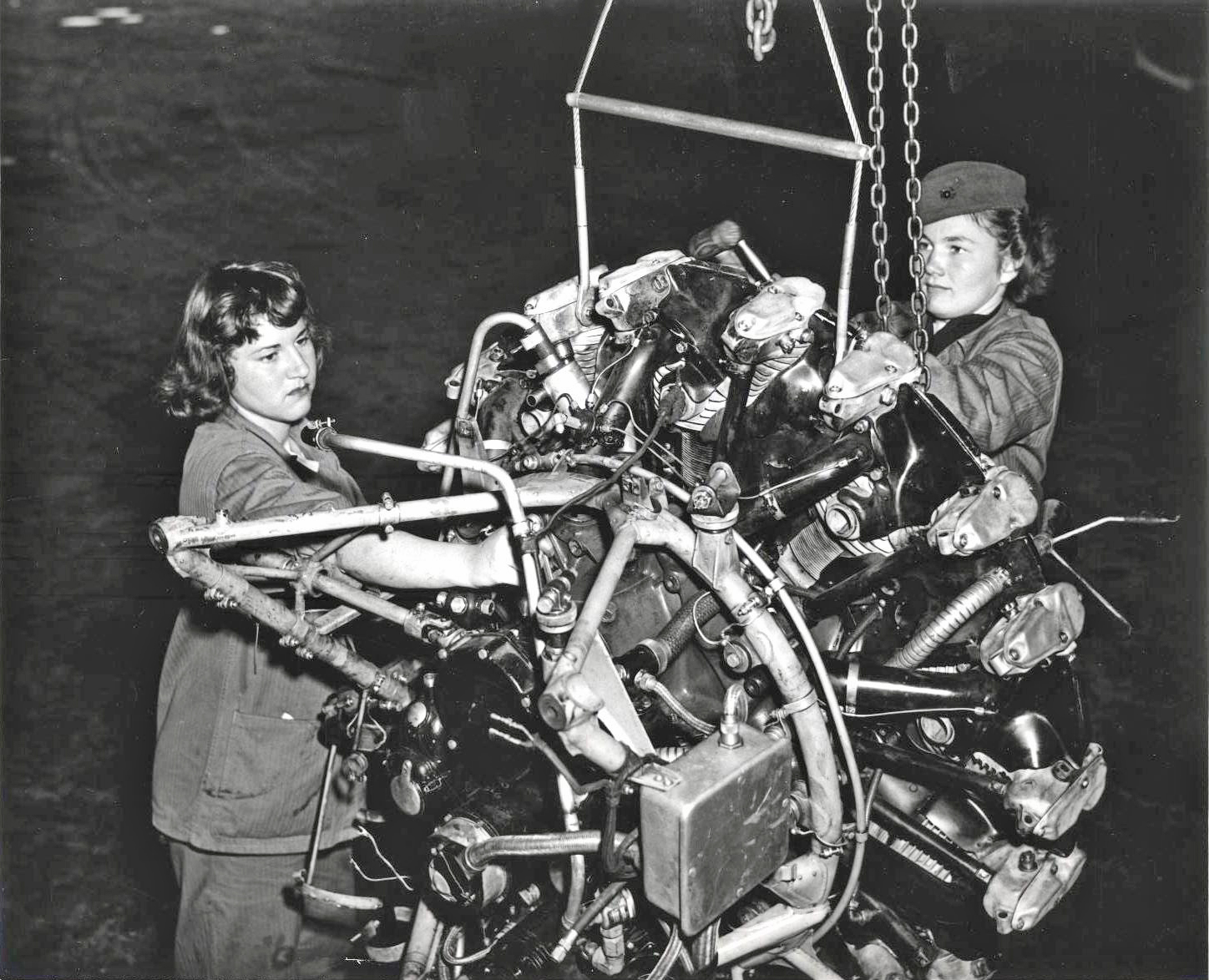
Private First Class Priscilla Goodrich (right) and Private Elaine Munsinger (left) doing engine repair at the Cherry Point, North Carolina, Marine Corps Air Station during World War II. Official USMC photograph.

Reserve members were prohibited from serving outside the continental United States; however, this impediment changed on September 27, 1944 when Public Law 441 amended 689 to allow Reserve members to serve in the Territory of Hawaii. Some thought the enactment of Public Law 441 was anticlimactic. Colonel Streeter believed that sending Reserve members to Hawaii "was not worth all the trouble and cost." Nevertheless, the Marine Corps did deploy women to Hawaii. Hawaiian duty was on a volunteer basis. Many members applied, but only the very best of them were accepted. The applicants were subject to the following requirements: had to have been on active duty for at least six months; commit to an 18-month tour; have a clean record; be in excellent mental and physical health; agree not to request leave to visit the mainland, and verify they had no dependents whose care might necessitate a trip back to the mainland. In addition, members were expected to have a stable personality, sufficient skill to fill one of the billets for which women had been requested, and motivation to do a good job. San Diego, California, became the staging area, where a short yet intense physical conditioning course was given. The first contingent of women arrived in Hawaii on January 28, 1945. At mid-year, there were about 1,000 women serving in Hawaii. By January 1946, they were all back on the mainland.

== Fatal accidents ==
Between February 1943 and September 1946, eighteen women reserve members were killed, the majority of them in off-duty automobile accidents. Only three members were killed while in the performance of their duties.

On October 1945, four members from the El Toro Air Station died when the automobile they were riding in was hit by a train near Irvine, California. Corporal Nancy Engwall and Anna McDougall (rate unknown) were killed instantly, while Corporal Virginia Ruth Spalding and Private Shirley Kilian died later at the Long Beach Naval Hospital.

Second Lieutenant Mary Rita Palowitch and Corporal Germaine C. Laville, Aerial Gunnery Instructors, were teaching at the Cherry Point Air station, when a civilian cleaning crew accidentally started a fire in their building. Initially, Laville escaped, but returned to the blaze after she heard others scream for help. Both Palowitch and Laville perished in the fire. Laville was cited posthumously for her bravery.

== Demobilization ==
At the end of the war, the task of demobilization fell to Colonel Katherine A. Towle, the second director of the Reserve. In December 1945, the Reserve was down to about 12,300 members, with expectations of reducing this number by 2,000 each month thereafter. The demobilization plan called for mandatory resignation or discharge of all Reserve members by September 1, 1946. Separation centers were set up at San Diego, San Francisco, El Toro, Parris Island, and Lejeune. In early 1946, there was speculation that legislation to give women permanent status in the military was being considered, which prompted the Marine Corps to relax its demobilization policy. On June 15, 1946, the wartime office of the Reserve was closed when Colonel Towle returned to work at the University of California. The outgoing director proposed that Julia E. Hamblet replace her. Three months later, Hamblet was appointed as the third and final director of the wartime Reserve. When August 1946 came around, some 300 women had been asked by the Marine Corps to stay on, even as the last of the Reserve's barracks was being closed. For the next two years, these women served the Marine Corps in an undetermined status. However, on July 30, 1948, the Women's Armed Services Act (Public Law 625) was signed into law, which allowed these and other women to serve in the regular Marine Corps.

== Recognition ==
On its first anniversary, February 13, 1944, the Reserve received a congratulatory message from President Franklin D. Roosevelt:

The nation is as proud of you as of your fellow Marines – for Marine women are upholding the brilliant traditions of the corps with a spirit of loyalty and diligence worthy of the highest admiration of all Americans. You have quickly and efficiently taken over scores of different kinds of duties that not long ago were considered strictly masculine assignments, and in doing so, you have freed a large number of well-trained, battle-ready men of the corps for action ...

General Thomas Holcomb, Commandant of the U.S. Marine Corps, had initially been opposed to having women serve in the Marine Corps. However, before the end of 1943, he had reversed himself, saying:

"Like most Marines, when the matter first came up I didn't believe women could serve any useful purpose in the Marine Corps ... Since then I've changed my mind."

== See also ==
- Women in the Air Force (WAF)
- Women in the United States Navy
- Women's Army Corps (United States Army)
- Women's Auxiliary Air Force (British)
- Women's Royal Canadian Naval Service
- Women's Royal Naval Service (British) "Wrens"
- Women's Royal Australian Naval Service
