= Tiara =

Jeweled head ornament

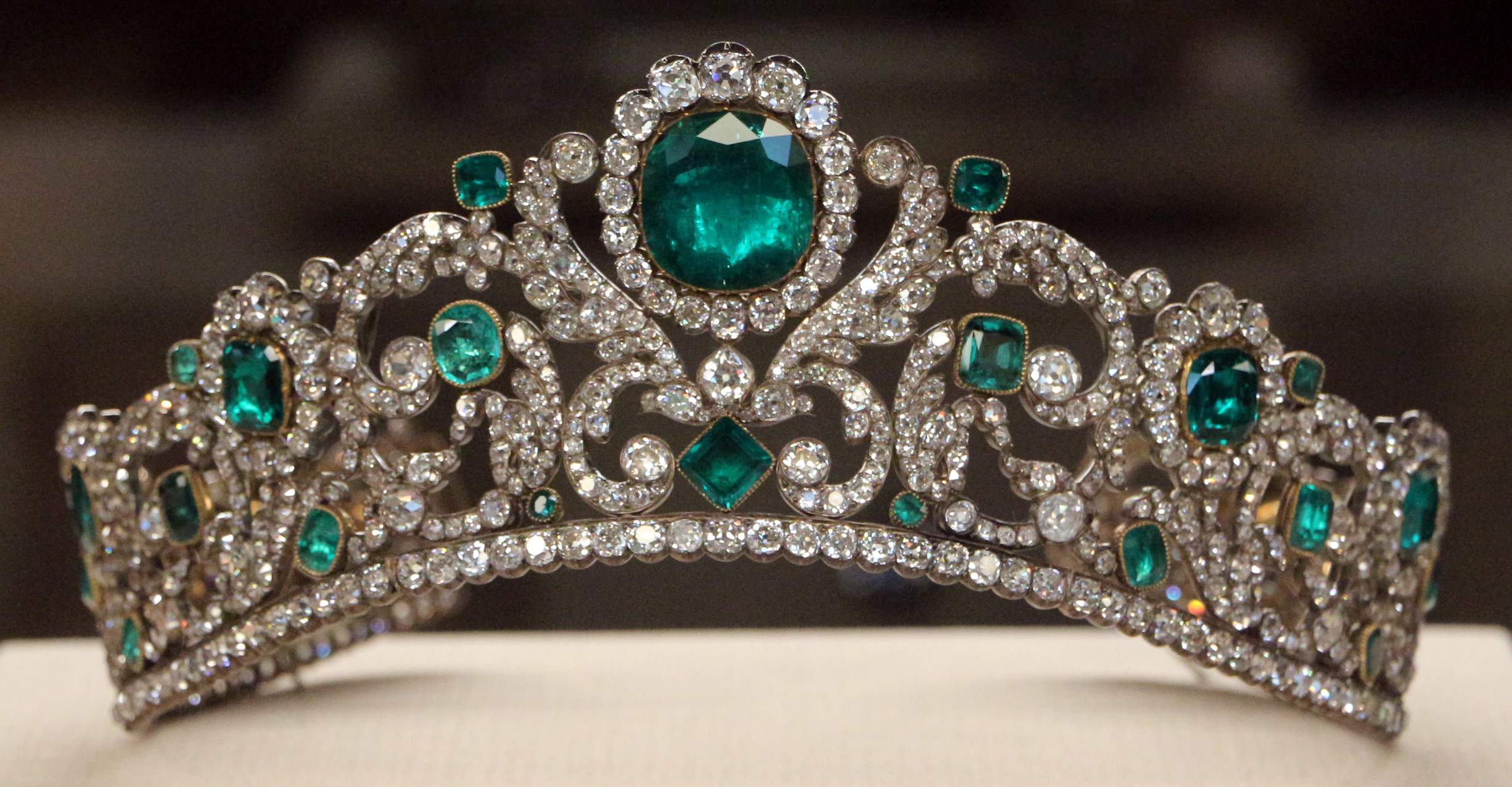
Tiara made for the French princess Marie-Thérèse, Duchess of Angoulême, 1820

A tiara (from Latin tiara, from Ancient Greek τιάρα tiára) is a head ornament adorned with jewels. Its origins date back to ancient Persia, from where it was later popularized by the Greco-Roman world. By the 18th century, the tiara had become fashionable in Europe as prestigious pieces of jewelry worn by women on formal occasions. The basic shape of the modern tiara is a semicircular base, usually made of gold, silver, or platinum, and richly decorated with gemstones, pearls, or cameos.

Tiaras were extremely popular during the late 19th century and were worn at events with a white tie dress code. After World War I, their use declined, except for official occasions at royal courts. Interest in tiaras has increased again since the early 21st century. The word tiara is often used interchangeably with diadem.

== Description ==
The basic shape of the modern tiara is a semi-circle, usually made of silver, gold or platinum. Tiaras have also been made from tortoiseshell, coral and quartz, and in the 20th century unusual materials such as horn and aluminium were experimented with.

Tiaras are usually richly decorated with precious stones, pearls or cameos, often arranged in symmetrical patterns. Common elements in these patterns are arcs, garlands, circles, stars, and stylised flowers or leaves. Occasionally, flowers, ears of corn, dragonflies or butterflies are depicted more or less "true to life" by using gemstones in different colours. A tiara can contain hundreds to thousands of gemstones of different sizes and cuts; almost always, tiaras incorporate a large number of diamonds. This puts tiaras among the most expensive and spectacular pieces of jewelry.

Tiaras come in different models, including:

- the bandeau, a tiara in the shape of a ribbon or hairband,
- the kokoshnik, a tiara that usually consists of a massive wall of gemstones; the shape is based on the traditional Russian headdress with the same name,
- the circlet, a tiara that extends around the circumference of the head,
- the fringe, a fringed trim of diamonds that can often also be worn as a necklace.
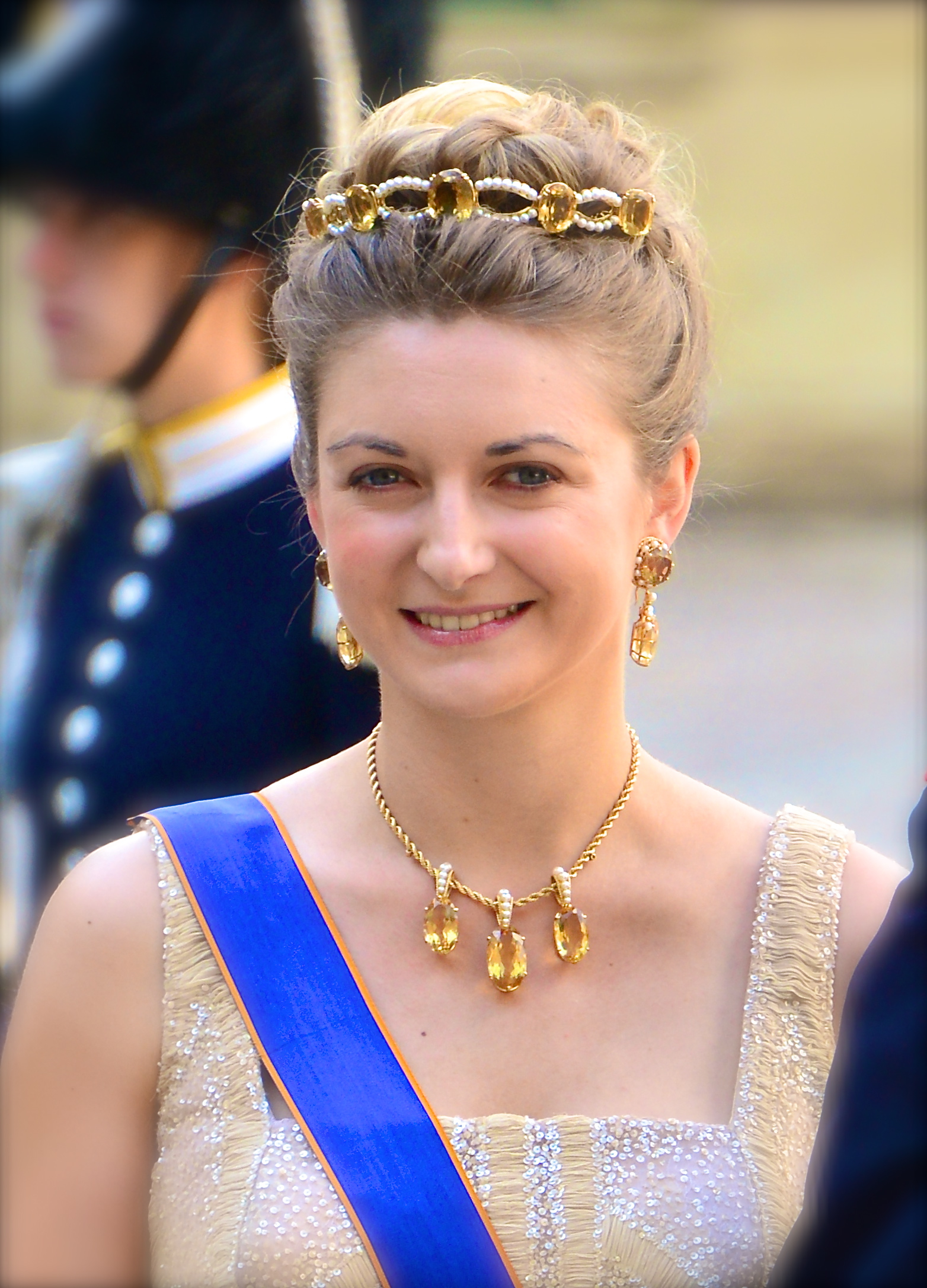
Bandeau tiara (worn by Stéphanie, Hereditary Grand Duchess of Luxembourg)

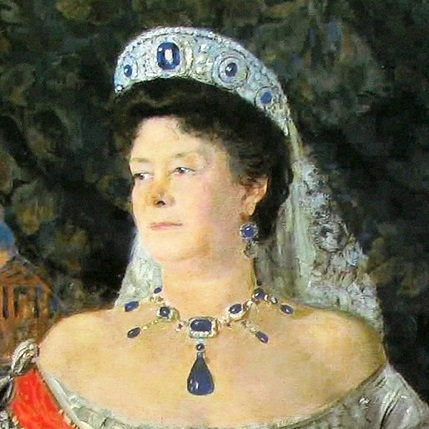
Kokoshnik tiara (worn by Grand Duchess Maria Pavlovna of Russia)

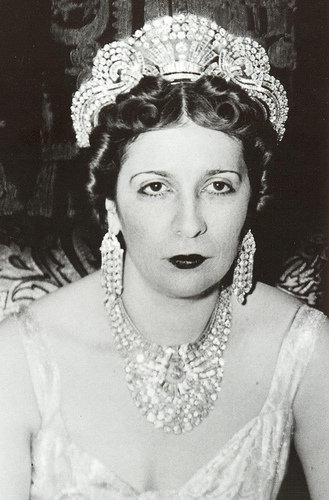
Circlet tiara (worn by Queen Nazli of Egypt)

Tiaras are worn on the head, but also around the forehead; this depends on the model of the tiara and the fashion of the day. Wearing a tiara can lead to headaches. To make it more comfortable to wear, a large tiara is often attached to a supporting frame that is cushioned by wrapping it with velvet ribbons.

Some tiaras can be disassembled into elements that can be worn individually as a necklace or brooch. Tiaras are sometimes part of a parure: a matching set of, for example, tiara, necklace, earrings, brooches and bracelets.

== Etiquette ==
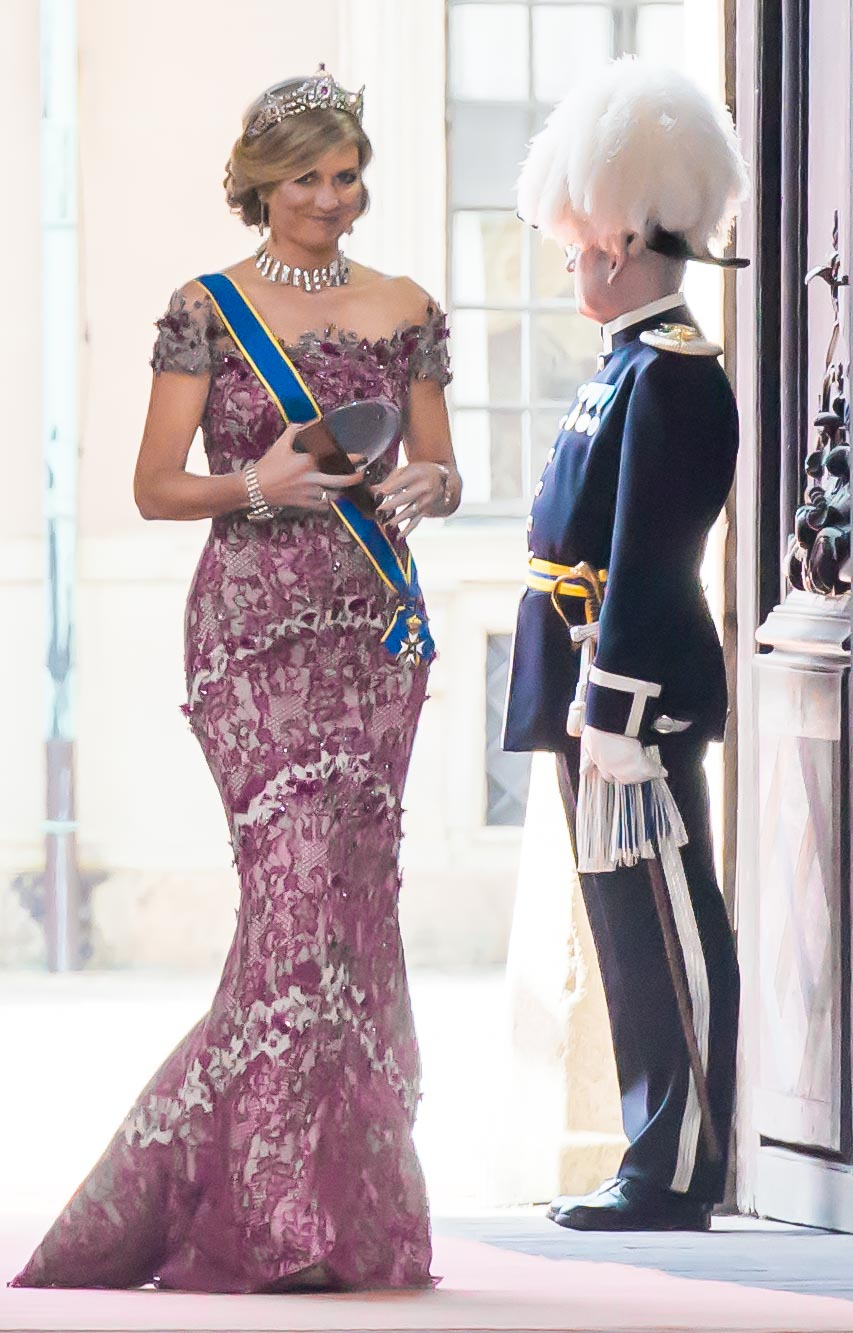
Queen Máxima of the Netherlands in 'white tie' dress code, with tiara.

It is sometimes thought that only titled women are allowed to wear a tiara, but that is not true. Any woman can wear a tiara to events where the dress code "white tie" applies. However, events in hotels are excluded.

Traditionally, young women do not wear a tiara until they are married. On their wedding day, they would wear a tiara owned by their birth family. Once a woman was married, she should only wear tiaras that were owned by her husband's family, or her own personal property. There was an exception for unmarried princesses who were allowed to wear tiaras from the age of eighteen. In the 21st century, these rules are no longer strictly applied.

There are special black tiaras made of jet, onyx, glass or steel to be worn with mourning clothes. For the later stages of mourning (second mourning and half mourning), tiaras with purple stones (amethyst), white stones (diamond and moonstone) or pearls were also considered appropriate.

== History ==
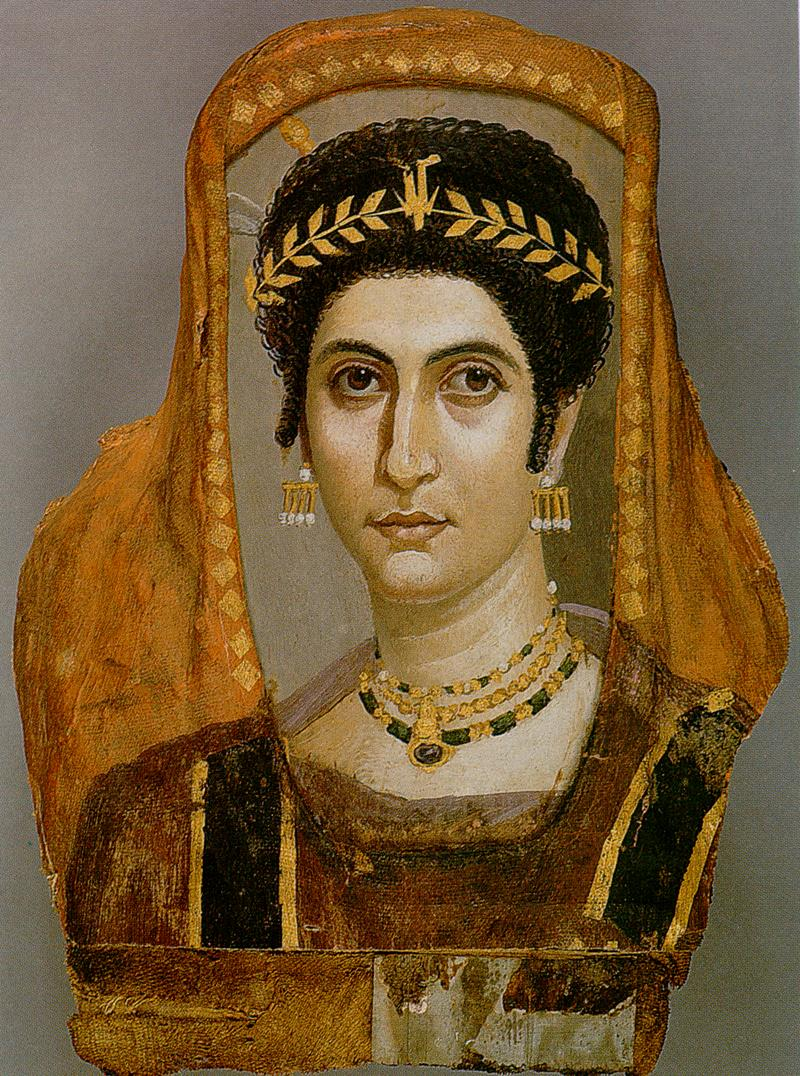
This Fayum mummy portrait shows a woman wearing a golden wreath, c. 100–110 AD.

=== Pre-18th century ===
According to jewellery specialist Geoffrey Munn, "The word 'tiara' is actually Persian in origin—the name first denoted the high-peaked head-dresses of Persian kings, which were encircled by 'diadems' (bands of purple and white decoration). Now, it is used to describe almost every form of decorative head ornament." Accordingly, ancient Greek historian Herodotus noted that Achaemenid Persian soldiers "wore on their heads loose caps called tiaras", claiming that this was the reason their skulls became “feeble".

Ancient Greeks and Romans soon used gold to make wreath-shaped head ornaments, while the Scythians' resembled a stiff halo that would serve as the inspiration for later Russian kokoshniks. The use of tiaras and diadems declined along with the fall of the Roman Empire and the rise of Christianity. From the early Middle Ages onwards, European princesses and queens were known to wear crowns, and brides wore special bridal crowns on their wedding day. In the 17th and 18th centuries, reigning queens began to wear head ornaments to indicate their special status. This custom did not catch on widely, partly because the enormous ladies' hairstyles of the eighteenth century made wearing a tiara difficult.

=== 18th and 19th century ===
In the late 18th century, Neoclassicism gave rise to a revival of tiaras, but this time it was a solely female adornment. Jewelers taking inspiration from Ancient Greece and Rome created new wreaths made from precious gemstones. Napoleon and his wife Joséphine de Beauharnais are credited with popularizing tiaras along with the new Empire style. Napoleon wanted the French court to be the grandest in Europe and gave his wife many parures which included tiaras. A number of tiaras made for Napoleon's first wife Joséphine are still in the possession of European royal houses, such as the Swedish cameo tiara.

In the 19th century, the tiara quickly became popular among royal and noble women as a way of expressing status and attracting attention. The tiara became an essential part of women's attire for court ceremonies, balls, dinners and other gala occasions. Often, a bride received a tiara as a gift from her husband or father on her wedding day.

The height of the tiara's popularity lay between 1890 and 1914. Women from the highest — and richest — social classes often had several tiaras to choose from. Wearing a tiara was no longer something just for the nobility. In the United States, too, tiaras were common at gala occasions, especially in New York upper social circles. Great jewelry houses like Garrard, Fabergé, Chaumet, Cartier and Van Cleef & Arpels all produced tiaras for their clientele.

In Paris great aigrette balls were organized by aristocratic families who were proud of their name and their past, such as the Duchesse de Gramount with her "Crinoline Ball" and Princess Jacques de Broglie with her "Gemstone Ball" of 1914. In distant New York, Philadelphia and Newport on the other hand, Mrs. William Astor, Mrs. George J. Gould, Mrs. W.K. Vanderbilt and Eva (Mrs. Edward) Stotesbury entertained with a degree of magnificence which made European balls appear almost insignificant. The moneyed classes of the United States, who had originally raised themselves above their bourgeois origins through their own hard work, set out to rival the historical aristocracy of Europe. In friendly competition with her rivals, the well-to-do American women refused to forgo any of the attributes sanctioned by society. These accessories included country houses imported from Europe complete with ancestral portraits and furnishings, as well as tiaras order from Cartier's in Paris and later New York.

— Cartier By Hans Nadelhoffer

=== 20th and 21st century ===
Diadem designed by René Lalique in Art Nouveau style

With the advent of Jugendstil and Art Nouveau, the line between jewellery and art became blurred. Artists such as René Lalique and the British architect and jewellery designer Henry Wilson created artistic tiaras that could not easily be worn in real life.

After the First World War, it became less fashionable to wear a tiara. This was due to social and economic changes (ostentatious display of wealth was considered less acceptable) but also to the fact that women cut their hair short and — after the introduction of shampoo — washed their hair more often. Clean hair is smooth and soft, offering less 'grip' for a tiara. During the Art Deco period between World War I and World War II, tiaras were made using the rigid geometric patterns associated with this style; these were also often designed to be easy to wear with short hair. In the 1960s, the tiara briefly reappeared when the high-cropped beehive hairstyle became popular.

Since the end of the twentieth century, tiaras are worn almost exclusively at state banquets, royal weddings and coronations. At 'white-tie' occasions a tiara is no longer required. However, tiaras are still being made and some auction houses and jewellers are seeing an increased interest in tiaras since the beginning of the 21st century. Fashion designer Versace made a tiara which was worn by pop star Madonna. The Danish royal family has a tiara on loan that was designed in 2009 for an exhibition of classic and modern tiaras.

== Collections ==
Queen Elizabeth II was said to have had the largest and most valuable collection of tiaras in the world, many of which are heirlooms of the British royal family. She was often seen wearing them on state occasions. Queen Mary purchased the Grand Duchess Vladimir tiara in the 1920s. It consists of numerous interlocking diamond circles. Pearl drops or emeralds can be attached inside the circles. Queen Mary had a tiara made for the Delhi Durbar held in 1911 in India. It is now on loan for wearing by Queen Camilla, wife of King Charles III. Queen Elizabeth II commissioned a ruby and diamond tiara. A gift of aquamarines she received as a present from the people of Brazil were added to diamonds to make a new tiara.

Other queens, empresses, and princesses regularly wear tiaras at formal evening occasions. The Swedish Royal Family have a collection as do the Danish, the Dutch, and Spanish monarchies. Many of the Danish royal jewels originally came into the collection when Princess Louise of Sweden married the future King Frederik VIII of Denmark. The Romanov dynasty had a collection up until the revolution of 1917. The Iranian royal family also had a large collection of tiaras. Since 1955, they are housed with the Iranian National Jewels at the Treasury of National Jewels in Tehran.

On rare occasions, usually when the actual tiara is exceptionally old and valuable due to its history and gemstones, realistic copies may be made and worn in place of the original due to insurance considerations.

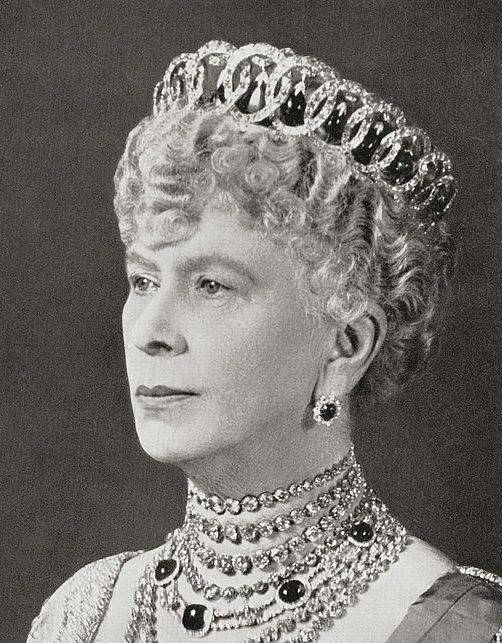
Queen Mary of the United Kingdom wearing the Grand Duchess Vladimir tiara

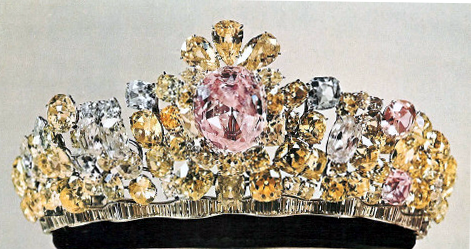
The Noor-ul-Ain tiara of Farah Pahlavi, Shahbanu of Iran

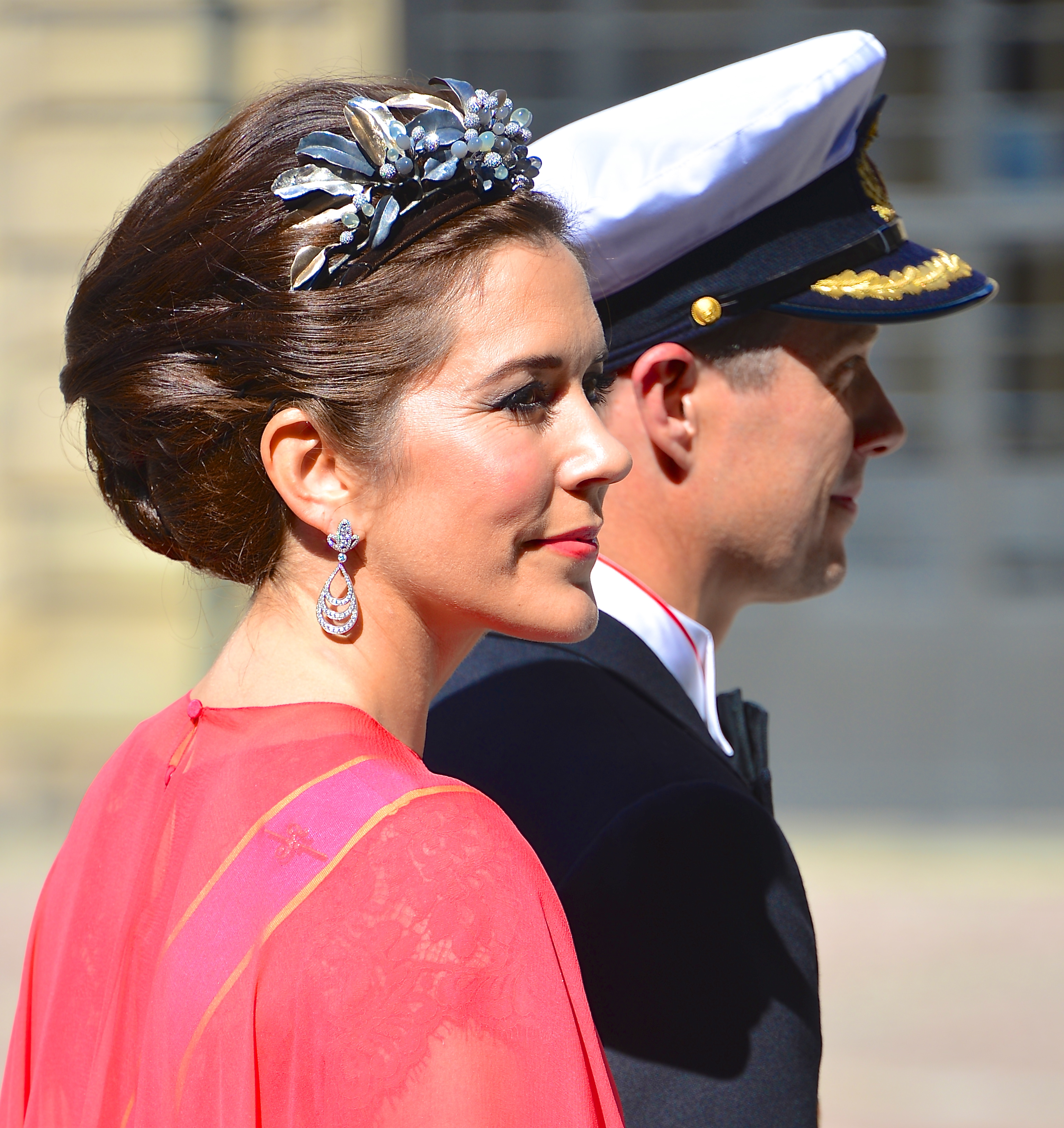
The 'midnight tiara' was made in 2009. Worn by Crown Princess Mary of Denmark (now Queen Mary of Denmark).

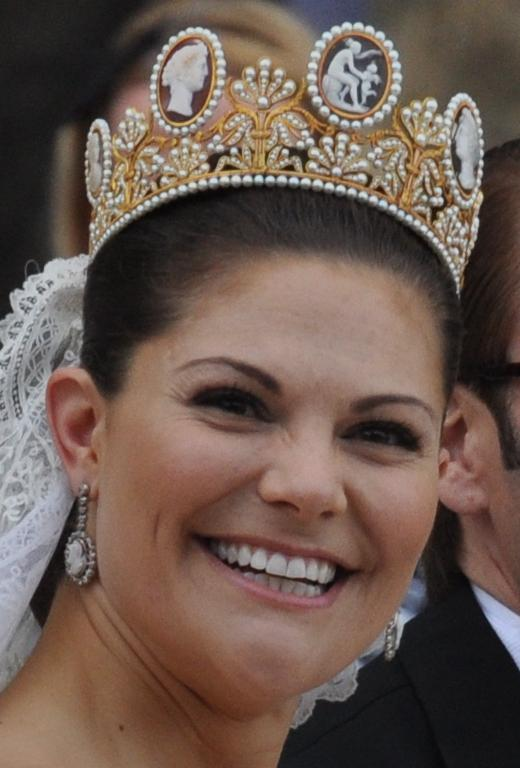
Cameo tiara originally made for Joséphine de Beauharnais, now in the possession of the Swedish royal family, worn by Crown Princess Victoria.

== See also ==
- Aigrette
- Circlet
- Civic crown
- Coronet
- Crown
- Diadem
- Headband
- Laurel wreath
- Liangbatou
- Military tiara
- Mural crown
- Papal tiara
- Jewels of Elizabeth II
- Jewels of Diana, Princess of Wales
- Jewels of the Swedish royal family
- Tainia
