= Michael Boorda =

American admiral (1939–1996)

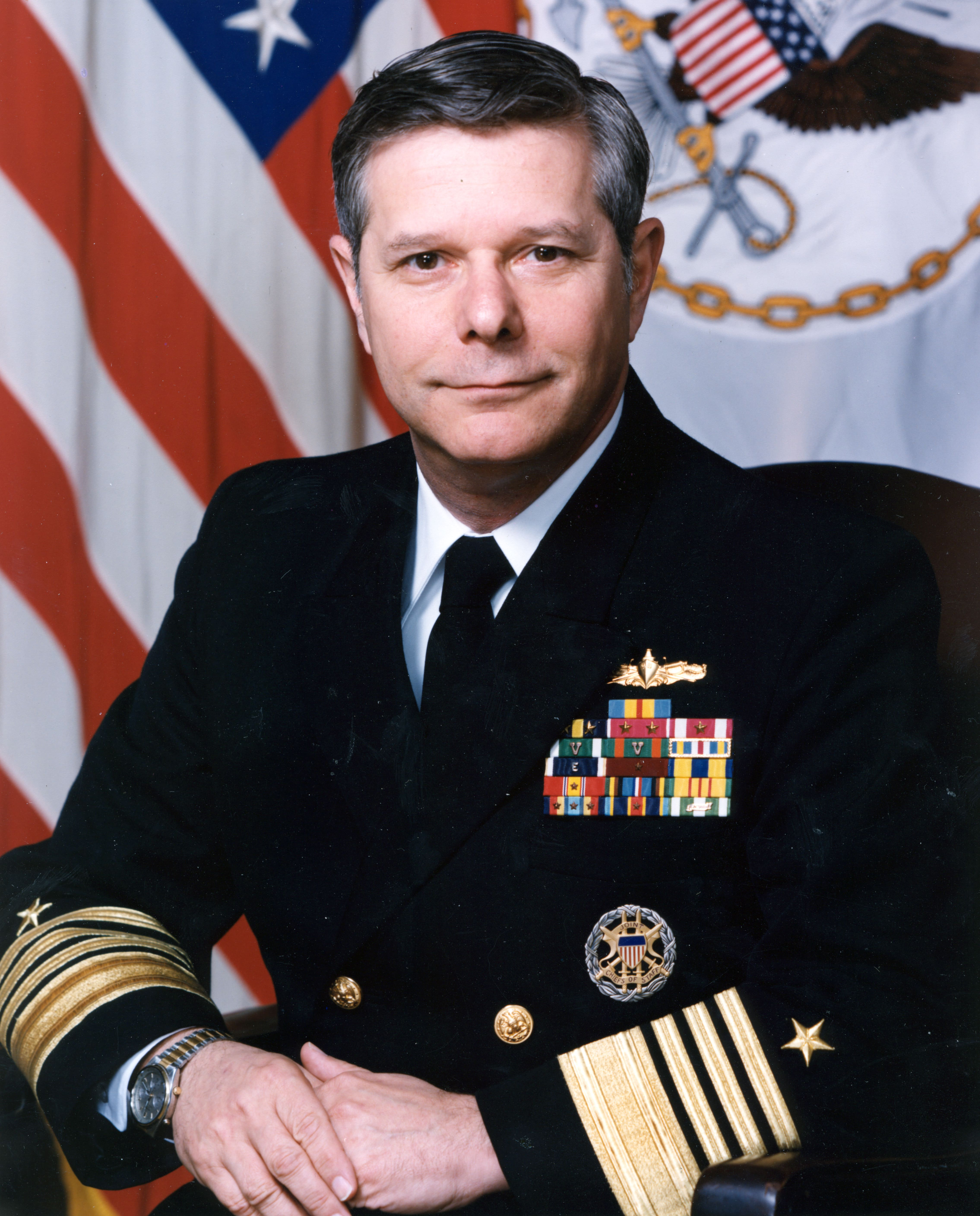
- Boorda's official Chief of Naval Operations portrait; note the two ribbons with "V" devices
- Born: November 26, 1939; South Bend, Indiana, United States
- Died: May 16, 1996 (aged 56); Washington, D.C., United States
- Burial place: Arlington National Cemetery (Section 64, Lot 7101 Grid MM-17)
- Military career
- Allegiance: United States
- Branch: United States Navy
- Service years: 1956–1996
- Rank: Admiral
- Nickname: Mike
- Commands: Chief of Naval Operations; United States Naval Forces Europe; Allied Forces Southern Europe; Chief of Naval Personnel; Cruiser-Destroyer Group Eight; Destroyer Squadron 22; USS Farragut; USS Parrot
- Conflicts: Vietnam War; Bosnian War
- Awards: Defense Distinguished Service Medal (2); Navy Distinguished Service Medal (4); Army Distinguished Service Medal; Air Force Distinguished Service Medal; Coast Guard Distinguished Service Medal; Legion of Merit (3); Meritorious Service Medal (2); Navy and Marine Corps Commendation Medal; Navy and Marine Corps Achievement Medal

Jeremy Michael Boorda (November 26, 1939 – May 16, 1996) was a United States Navy admiral who served as the 25th Chief of Naval Operations. Boorda is notable as the first person to have risen from the enlisted ranks to become Chief of Naval Operations, the highest-ranking billet in the United States Navy.

Boorda died by suicide by shooting himself in the chest after leaving suicide notes reported to contain expressions of concern that he had tarnished the reputation of the Navy, following a media investigation into the legitimacy of his having worn on his uniform two service medals with bronze "V" devices, which indicate the awards were for acts of valor. The "V" devices are by regulation only to be awarded to personnel who performed an act of valor in actual combat, and Boorda had not served in combat. Boorda had removed the two medal devices on his uniform almost a year before he died and was generally perceived as having made a good-faith error in believing he was authorized to wear the devices.

== Early life ==
Boorda was born in South Bend, Indiana, to Jewish parents, Gertrude (Frank) Wallis and Herman Boorda. His family moved to Momence, Illinois, where his father had a dress shop. His grandparents had immigrated from Ukraine.

When he was 19, Boorda married Bettie Mae Moran. Their first son David was born with severe disabilities. They had two more sons, Edward and Robert, and a daughter named Anna. Boorda and his wife raised their children as Protestants.

== Career ==
Boorda dropped out of high school to enlist in the United States Navy in 1956 at the age of 17; it provided a structure he at first disliked but came to appreciate. He finished high school while in the Navy and attained the rate of Personnelman First Class. As an enlisted sailor, Boorda served at a variety of commands, primarily in aviation. His last two enlisted assignments were in Attack Squadron 144 and Carrier Airborne Early Warning Squadron 11.

Boorda was selected for potential commissioning under the Integration Program in 1962, by which enlisted sailors were admitted to the Navy's Officer Candidate School in Newport, Rhode Island. Boorda was commissioned as an ensign upon graduating in August 1962. He first served aboard USS Porterfield as combat information center officer at the rank of lieutenant junior grade. In 1964, he attended the Naval Destroyer School in Newport.

In October 1964, Boorda was assigned as weapons officer aboard the destroyer USS John R. Craig. The destroyer deployed to Vietnam in March 1965 and participated in combat missions and operations off the coast of Vietnam until it departed for San Diego on August 11. On August 15, Boorda was recommended for the Navy Commendation Medal by his commanding officer on John R. Craig. On August 28, the Commander in Chief, U.S. Pacific Fleet, approved a lesser award, the Secretary of the Navy Commendation for Achievement (redesignated the Navy Achievement Medal in July 1967). The citation read: "for meritorious service while serving as Weapons Officer in USS JOHN R. CRAIG (DD 885) while operating in combat missions supporting the Republic of Vietnam from 10 April to 10 August 1965".

After the destroyer arrived in San Diego in September, Boorda served as commander of USS Parrot. His first shore tour was as a weapons instructor at Naval Destroyer School in Newport. In December 1971, after attending the U.S. Naval War College and also earning a Bachelor of Arts degree in political science from the University of Rhode Island, Boorda assumed duties as Executive Officer, USS Brooke, a guided missile destroyer. In October 1972, the Seventh Fleet, including Boorda's ship departed for Vietnam; his second tour began in November 1972 and ended on February 19, 1973. On April 8, the commanding officer of Brooke recommended Boorda for the Navy Commendation Medal (without the Combat "V"). The medal was approved by the Commander, Seventh Fleet, and the citation read: "for meritorious achievement as Executive Officer while attached to and serving in USS BROOKE (DEG 1) from 15 December 1971 to 20 February 1973 including combat operations".

That tour was followed by a short period at the University of Oklahoma as an NROTC special instructor and an assignment from June 1973 to May 1975 as head, surface lieutenant commander assignments/assistant for captain detailing in the Bureau of Naval Personnel, Washington, D.C. From 1975 to 1977, Boorda commanded USS Farragut. He was next assigned as executive assistant to the Assistant Secretary of the Navy (Manpower and Reserve Affairs), Washington, DC. He relieved the civilian presidential appointee in that position, remaining until 1981, when he took command of Destroyer Squadron 22. After this, Boorda spent an additional period studying at the Naval War College from September to October 1983. In 1983–84, he served as executive assistant to the Chief of Naval Personnel/Deputy Chief of Naval Operations for Manpower, Personnel and Training. In December 1984, he assumed his first flag officer assignment as executive assistant to the Chief of Naval Operations, remaining until July 1986. His next assignment was commander, Cruiser-Destroyer Group Eight in Norfolk, Virginia; he served as a carrier battle group commander embarked in USS Saratoga, and also as commander, Battle Force Sixth Fleet in 1987.

In August 1988, Boorda became Chief of Naval Personnel/Deputy Chief of Naval Operations for Manpower, Personnel and Training. In November 1991, he received his fourth star and in December 1991, became Commander in Chief, Allied Forces Southern Europe (CINCSOUTH – Naples, Italy) and Commander in Chief, United States Naval Forces Europe (CINCUSNAVEUR – London). As CINCSOUTH, Boorda was in command of all NATO forces engaged in operations enforcing United Nations sanctions during the Yugoslav wars.

On February 1, 1993, while serving as Commander in Chief, Allied Forces Southern Europe, Boorda assumed the additional duty as Commander, Joint Task Force Provide Promise, responsible for the supply of humanitarian relief to Bosnia-Herzegovina via air-land and air-drop missions, and for troops contributing to the UN mission throughout the Balkans. On April 23, 1994, Boorda became the 25th Chief of Naval Operations, the first who was not a graduate of the United States Naval Academy and the first of Jewish descent.

On February 24, 1996, he attended the christening and launching of USS Pearl Harbor at the Avondale Shipyard located on the west bank of the Mississippi River near New Orleans, Louisiana. Boorda personally greeted 73 members of the Pearl Harbor Survivors Association, and over 600 other military and civilian honorees who also were invited.

=== Seaman to Admiral ===
Boorda was a product of an enlisted-to-officer commissioning program in the early 1960s. Known as the Integration Program, this was designed to provide an opportunity for enlisted personnel who possessed outstanding qualifications and motivation for a naval career to obtain a commission. Boorda was the first Chief of Naval Operations to have risen from the enlisted rates, one of only four such modern service chiefs (the others being Air Force General Larry D. Welch, USMC General Alfred Gray, and Army General John Shalikashvili). Upon assuming this position, Boorda immediately re-established the historic program, naming it "Seaman to Admiral", as part of a STA-21 initiative for young sailors to earn their commission and become naval officers. Boorda believed "people should have the opportunity to excel, and be all they can be, even if they don't get a perfect or traditional start."

=== C4I ===
Boorda was particularly interested in C4I initiatives to place command and control, communications, computers, and intelligence assets on naval ships. Essentially this manifested itself as more robust combat information systems, with improved satellite and communication links, as well as placing more defensive assets on traditionally non-combatant ships such as support vessels. Boorda initiated efforts during the proposal phase for the future LPD-17 amphibious class to be fitted with first-class C4I suites, radars, communications, and defense systems-anti-torpedo, anti-missile, and anti-NBC (nuclear, biological, and chemical), along with blast-hardened bulkheads that will absorb and dissipate much more punishment than was possible with the present at the time designs. This effort was a departure from past efforts, which relied on simply assigning a destroyer or cruiser to provide these functions for amphibious forces. The ship was commissioned January 14, 2006, nine years after Boorda's death.

=== Enlisted advancement system ===
Boorda also spearheaded efforts to change the U.S. Navy's officer fitness report, enlisted evaluation, and enlisted advancement systems. The new systems were more systematic and consistent. The systems also allowed a more concise rating of an officer's or sailor's advancement potential. This rating allowed a command to mark only 20% of officers or sailors as "early promotes", and set strict grading criteria for each evaluation mark. The new system linked each promotion marking to the advancement system.

=== Littoral oceanography ===
Boorda signed a policy for naval oceanography (the first such revision in 10 years), which emphasized, among other things, that, in addition to deep-water missions, naval oceanographers must master the complicated tangle of the oceanographic/geographic subject areas that make up the science of the littorals, or near-shore areas, as well as the complex weather patterns characteristic of any coastal area.

Boorda's vision brought the navy's new focus on littoral operations into alignment with naval projection policies. But this new program also created a large backlog of high priority oceanographic, hydrographic, and geophysical survey requirements. To meet those requirements, the navy expanded its oceanographic efforts from traditional platforms (ships, boats, planes) to new technologies (satellites, remote sensors, etc.), and efforts to work with other national and international agencies.

=== Stan Arthur incident ===
In the wake of the Tailhook scandal, Boorda faced hostility from a majority of naval flag officers who reportedly believed he had betrayed the Navy by allying himself with Clinton administration demands for reform of the Navy's officer corps. Naval aviators, in particular, were incensed by the treatment of Stan Arthur (Vice Chief of Naval Operations and senior Naval aviator), whose nomination for the post of commander, United States Pacific Command, was withdrawn by President Clinton at the behest of U.S. Senator David Durenberger.

Durenberger raised questions over Arthur's possible mishandling of sexual harassment allegations brought by one of the Senator's constituents, Rebecca Hansen, a female student naval aviator who had not successfully completed flight training.

The administration expected protracted hearings to ensue over Arthur's nomination, and the Pacific Command position to remain unfilled during this period. Arthur decided to retire on February 1, 1995. Boorda issued an unusual public defense of Arthur and his decision not to fight for the nomination, saying that "Stan Arthur is an officer of integrity ... who chose to take this selfless action ... in the interests of more rapidly filling a critical leadership position. Those who postulate other reasons for the withdrawal are simply wrong."

== Death ==
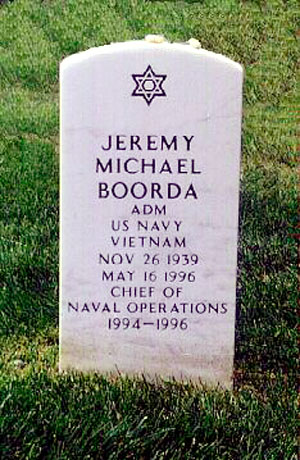
Boorda's headstone at Arlington National Cemetery located at Section 64, Grave 7101, Grid MM-17

Boorda died on May 16, 1996, in the garden outside his home at the Washington Navy Yard. Boorda reportedly left two typed and unsigned suicide notes in his home, neither of which was released publicly, but were said to have been addressed to his wife and to his public information officer.

Boorda was reported to have been distraught over a media investigation led by decorated U.S. Army Vietnam War veteran David Hackworth of Newsweek into two miniature bronze letter "V"s that Boorda had worn for years on two of his uniform's service ribbons. In the Navy, the Combat Distinguishing Device, or "V" device, is worn on a ribbon to denote a specific decoration was awarded for valor in or direct exposure to combat. Photographs of Boorda in uniform showed him wearing the "V" devices on his Navy and Marine Corps Commendation Medal and Navy and Marine Corps Achievement Medal ribbons in the 1980s. However, Boorda stopped wearing the "V" devices on these service ribbons about a year before the Hackworth investigation, after being informed by the Navy that he was not authorized to wear them.

Reports at the time of Boorda's suicide indicated that his wearing of the two "V" devices on the two service ribbons had not been an intentional deception on his part, but had been an unintentional mistake that resulted from his following verbal instructions delivered to commanders during the Vietnam War by Admiral Elmo Zumwalt when he was Chief of Naval Operations, as well as conflicting interpretations and updating of Navy award regulations. Newsweek later reported that "Hackworth believed that wearing an undeserved combat pin for valor was a grave matter of honor in the military, 'the worst thing you can do.'" Boorda's suicide took place shortly before he was to have met with two Newsweek reporters that day regarding his wearing of the "V" devices. Boorda was said to have been worried that the issue would cause more trouble for the U.S. Navy's reputation.

Former Chief of Naval Operations Zumwalt, who was Boorda's commander during the Vietnam War and who verbally authorized "V" devices for Boorda and many other sailors, wrote a letter to the effect that Boorda's wearing of the devices was "appropriate, justified and proper." However, wearing the Navy's Combat Distinguishing Device on a specific decoration that may authorize the device requires written authorization for the device on a printed award citation.

External videos
- Memorial service for Boorda, Washington National Cathedral, May 21, 1996

Boorda was survived by his wife, Bettie Moran Boorda, four children and eleven grandchildren. Boorda was interred at Arlington National Cemetery on May 19, 1996, with a tombstone marked with the Star of David. On May 21, a public memorial service was held at the Washington National Cathedral that was broadcast nationally by CNN with tape delay broadcast on the C-SPAN network.

In June 1998, then Navy Secretary John Dalton put into Boorda's file a letter from Admiral Zumwalt stating it was "'appropriate, justified and proper' for Boorda to attach the "V" devices to the ribbons on his uniform." According to the Associated Press, "the Navy also modified Boorda's record to list the V's among his other decorations... recognition that they were earned." However, later that year, one of Boorda's sons requested a formal review of his father's service record. In a decision dated June 24, 1999, the Department of the Navy Board for Correction of Naval Records determined that Boorda was not entitled to wear the "V" devices despite the additions to his personnel file.

== Awards and decorations ==
Boorda's military decorations and awards include:

Surface Warfare Officer Insignia
1st row	Defense Distinguished Service Medal with one bronze oak leaf cluster	Navy Distinguished Service Medal with three 5/16" Gold Stars	Army Distinguished Service Medal
2nd row	Air Force Distinguished Service Medal	Coast Guard Distinguished Service Medal	Legion of Merit with two 5/16" Gold Stars
3rd row	Meritorious Service Medal with one 5/16" Gold Star	Navy and Marine Corps Commendation Medal	Navy and Marine Corps Achievement Medal
4th row	Joint Meritorious Unit Award	Navy "E" Ribbon	Navy Good Conduct Medal with one 3/16" Bronze Star
5th row	Navy Expeditionary Medal	National Defense Service Medal with one 3/16" Bronze Star	Armed Forces Expeditionary Medal
6th row	Vietnam Service Medal with two 3/16" Bronze Stars	Navy Sea Service Deployment Ribbon with three 3/16" Bronze Stars	Navy and Marine Corps Overseas Service Ribbon with 3/16" Bronze Star
7th row	Unidentified foreign decoration	Legion of Honour, Officer (France)	Republic of Vietnam Campaign Medal with 1960– Device
Office of the Joint Chiefs of Staff Identification Badge

== Legacy ==
Boorda has two sons and one daughter-in-law who are naval officers. He has four grandsons who served in the U.S. military: Peter Boorda was a petty officer in the United States Coast Guard, Andrew Boorda is an armor officer in the U.S. Army, Phillip Boorda is an amphibious assault vehicle officer in the U.S. Marine Corps, and Robert Dowling is an intelligence officer in the U.S. Army. Andrew and Phillip are twins, and like their grandfather, both graduated from the University of Rhode Island. In addition, Boorda has a step-grandson who also graduated from the University of Rhode Island and is a field artillery officer in the U.S. Army.

In Joe Biden's 2007 book Promises to Keep, Biden recounts his experience of interacting with Admiral Boorda. Boorda met with Joe Biden in 1993, while serving as commander-in-chief of Allied Forces Southern Command, to advise the then-Senator on the military situation in the Balkans. Biden had been attempting to persuade the Clinton administration to intervene militarily to stop the genocide in Bosnia, but had been met with resistance, due to the widespread perception in Washington that any U.S. military intervention in the Balkans would have to involve significant numbers of ground troops. Boorda, however, argued that U.S. air power 'could shut down the Serb aggression and could end the sieges in Sarajevo and Srebrenica' without the need for a costly and unpopular commitment of ground forces. Biden credits this conversation with Boorda as being 'the last piece of the puzzle', enabling him to successfully make the case for intervention in Bosnia to Clinton. In his book, Biden is effusive in his praise of Boorda, calling him 'truly heroic', including him in a partial list of 'the twenty brightest, most informed individuals I've worked with in government', and referring to his suicide as 'a blow to the country'.

=== Admiral Jeremy M. Boorda Award ===
The Navy's annual Admiral Boorda award was established and first awarded in 2003. The award recognizes a Navy military and civilian individual. The call for nominations for the 2015 award indicated that the award was intended for those who have made significant contributions towards Navy personnel readiness either through research or analysis or the direct application of analytical results to policies and laws.

Military offices
Preceded by Frank B. Kelso II	Chief of Naval Operations; 1994–1996	Succeeded by Jay L. Johnson
