= Tail hook =

Tail hook or variant, may refer to:

- Tailhook - used on carrier based aircraft as a means to slow or halt the plane.
- Bondage tail hook
- Tailhook Association, a U.S. association of carrier aircraft pilots
- Tailhook scandal, a September 1991 scandal involving the Tailhook Association

== See also ==
- Hooktail (disambiguation)
- Hook (disambiguation)
- Tail (disambiguation)
