= Tailhook scandal =

1991 U.S. military scandal

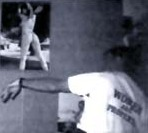
- A U.S. Navy aviation officer at the 1991 Tailhook convention wears a t-shirt printed with the phrase "Women are Property" in the VF-124 squadron suite.
- Date: September 5–8, 1991
- Place: Las Vegas, Nevada, U.S.

The Tailhook scandal was a military scandal in which United States Navy and Marine Corps aviation officers were alleged to have assaulted up to eighty-three women and seven men, or otherwise engaged in "improper and indecent" conduct at the Las Vegas Hilton in Las Vegas, Nevada. The events took place at the 35th Annual Tailhook Association Symposium from September 5 to 8, 1991. The event was subsequently abbreviated as "Tailhook '91" in media accounts.

The alleged sexual assaults mainly occurred in a third-floor hallway in which hospitality suites rented by participating military units for the conference were located. According to witnesses, a "gauntlet" of male military officers in civilian clothes groped, molested, or committed other sexual or physical assaults and harassment on women who walked through the hallway. In addition, military officers were alleged to have engaged in public nudity, excessive heavy drinking, public sexual activity, and other lewd behavior in and around the convention location at the hotel. One of the alleged victims, naval officer Paula Coughlin, initiated an investigation into the incident when she notified her chain of command about what she had experienced.

About a month after the conference, the public learned of the affair when it received widespread attention in the media. In response, the United States Congress, led by the Senate Armed Services Committee, directed the U.S. military to investigate the event, verify the allegations, and prosecute the personnel involved. The resulting Navy inquiries were criticized for failing to adequately investigate what had happened. Also, it was learned that Secretary of the Navy Henry Garrett had attended the convention, but his involvement had not been disclosed in the Navy's investigation report.

As a result, the Department of Defense Inspector General's Office took over the inquiry. Its investigation led to approximately 40 naval and Marine officers receiving non-judicial punishment, mainly for conduct unbecoming an officer and false official statements. Three naval officers were taken to courts-martial, but their cases were dismissed after the presiding military judge determined that the Chief of Naval Operations, Admiral Frank Kelso, who had attended the conference, had concealed his own involvement in the events in question.

The aftermath resulted in sweeping changes throughout all military services in the Department of Defense regarding attitudes and policies toward women. Military critics claimed that the scandal highlighted a hostile attitude in U.S. military culture towards women in the areas of sexual harassment, sexual assault and equal treatment of women in career advancement and opportunity. Following the incident, in April 1993, Secretary of Defense Les Aspin announced a revised policy on the assignment of women in the armed forces: both services were to allow women to compete for assignments in combat aircraft, and the Navy was to open additional ships to women and draft a proposal for Congress to remove existing legislative barriers to the assignment of women to combat vessels.

== Background ==
=== Tailhook history ===
The Tailhook Association began in 1956 as an informal club for Navy and Marine aviators (pilots and aircrew), who met once a year to socialize and swap stories. By 1963, the annual event had grown in popularity and attendance, and moved from San Diego to the Sands Hotel and Casino in Las Vegas. In 1968, the convention relocated to the Las Vegas Hilton, which became its home until 1991.

Over time, the Tailhook Association attained semi-official status with the U.S. military, including being given rent-free office space at Naval Air Station Miramar. The annual conventions featured forums, presentations, and symposiums on military aviation and operations. Officers were allowed to attend on official duty (called "temporary additional duty"), rather than leave, although they dressed in civilian clothes. Senior officers and Defense Department (DoD) officials, including flag officers, as well as defense contractors, also became regular attendees. The DoD often provided military aircraft for attendees to travel to the conference. In 1991, 96 percent of the Tailhook Association's 14,000 members were male, reflecting the numbers in the naval air fleet, in which, out of 9,419 pilots and aircrew, 177 were women, with only 27 of them flying in jet aircraft.

=== Concerns over behavior ===
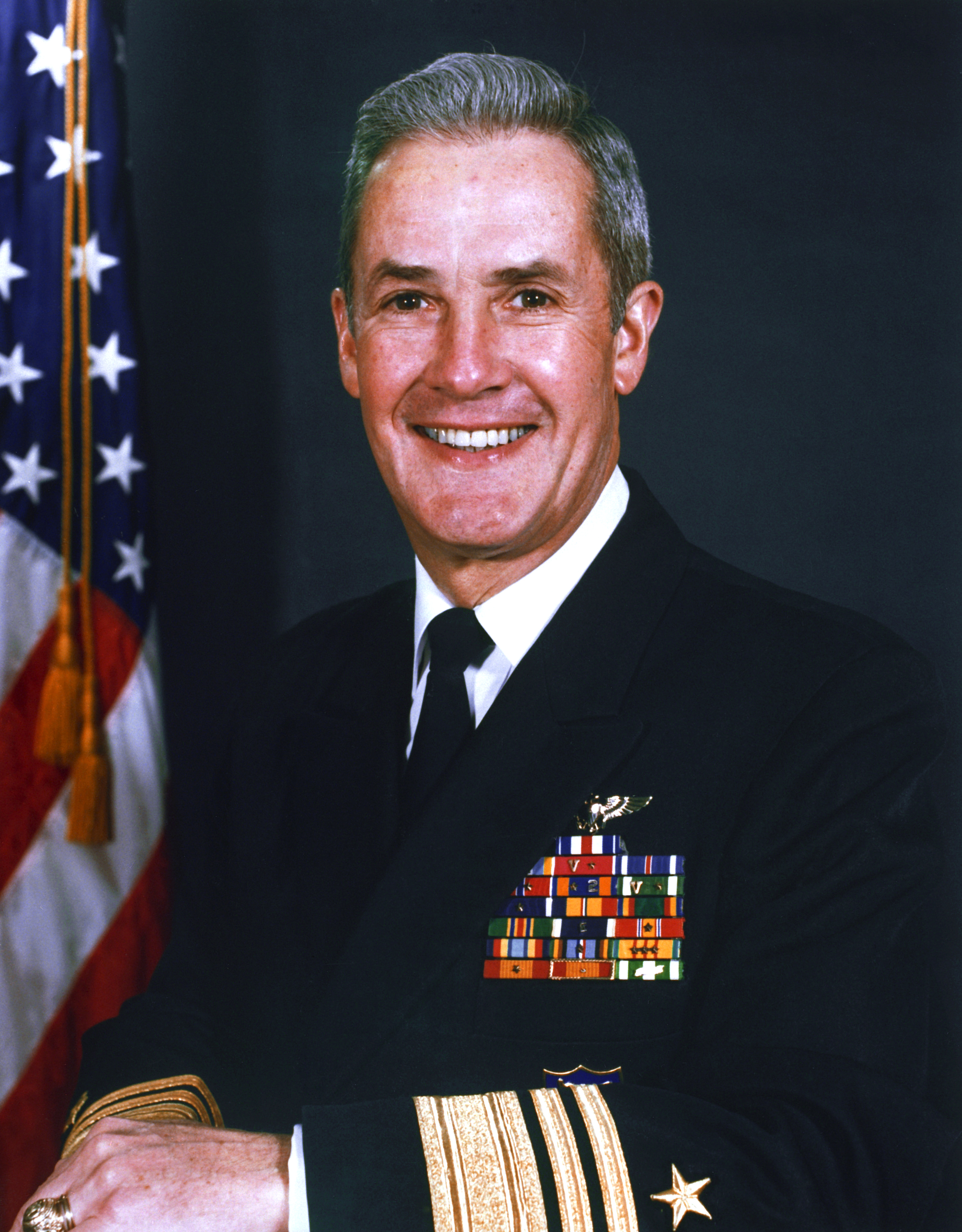
Vice Admiral Edward H. Martin complained about behavior in 1985

The conventions were well known for the partying atmosphere that prevailed. Participants at the conventions' social events frequently engaged in heavy drinking, public nudity, outrageous stunts, and aggressive sexual advances. Navy and Marine flying squadrons would host hospitality suites at the Hilton, many of which encouraged alcohol consumption and featured sexually oriented activities and presentations, such as performances by strippers. The events often caused thousands of dollars in damage to the hotel. Although Hilton and not the Tailhook Association was responsible for security, squadron officers were expected to maintain order and prevent damages.

After the 1985 convention, several senior attendees, led by Tailhook board members Commander Duke Cunningham, Rear Admiral James E. Service, and Vice Admiral Edward H. Martin, formally complained that the drunken revelry they had witnessed had crossed the line. In response to threats from Navy officials that official sponsorship could be withdrawn, the Tailhook Association imposed restrictions on behavior at future conventions, including the blacklisting of hospitality suites most known for promoting salacious activities. As a result, the 1986 convention exhibited calmer deportment, with one notable exception. Attendees later reported that Secretary of the Navy John Lehman (a commander in the Naval Reserve on active flight status) engaged in a sexual act with a stripper in front of 50 to 100 spectators in the hospitality suite for Navy fighter squadron VFA-127.

In spite of continued exhortations and warnings from Tailhook leadership, subsequent conventions returned to featuring excessive alcohol consumption, sexually explicit presentations and activities, and lewd behavior by attendees. Reportedly, some hospitality suite hosts competed with each other as to who had the most outrageous entertainment. In one custom that persisted, "ballwalking," male participants (usually on the patio around the pool or in the suites) would hang their genitalia outside of their unzipped pants.

Tailhook Association leaders were especially concerned over a practice that started in the late 1980s and became a custom at succeeding conventions. The custom involved young aviators lining up on both sides of the east wing third floor hospitality suite hallway and slapping stickers of their squadron insignia on the bodies of passersby, usually women. Often, after running out of stickers those involved would change to groping or pinching the women as they walked by. The activity became known among observers as the "gauntlet." The Hilton management was aware of the gauntlet, and had told its female staff to avoid the third floor at night during the Tailhook conventions.

== 1991 convention ==
=== Agenda ===
The 1991 Tailhook convention, formally titled "The 35th Annual Naval Aviation Symposium" and scheduled for September 5–8 at the Las Vegas Hilton, was expected to be the largest in the organization's history. The Gulf War had taken place earlier in the year, and over eleven hours of presentations and discussion concerning U.S. Navy and Marine Corps aviation operations in the conflict were to be the central focus for the 4,000 attendees. Twenty-two Navy and Marine flying squadrons or other military organizations reserved suites. Just over one-third of all the fixed-wing carrier aviators in the Navy were expected to be in attendance. On Friday, September 6, three of the eight Navy and Marine pilots shot down and captured by Iraq gave a presentation on their experiences. That evening the Chief of Naval Operations (CNO), Admiral Frank Kelso, spoke at a banquet for the attendees.

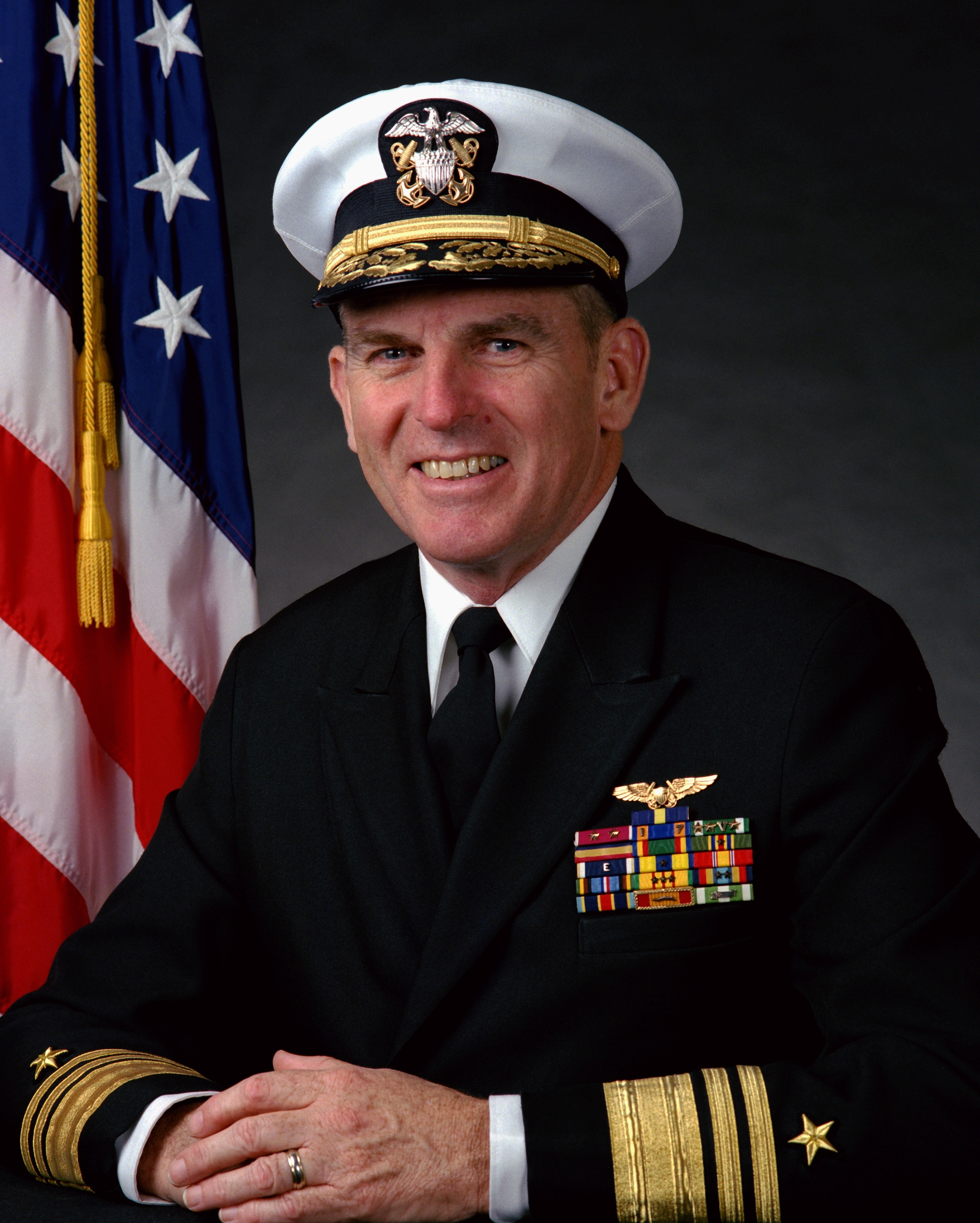
Chair of the 1991 Tailhook Association Symposium, Vice Admiral Richard Dunleavy

On the afternoon of Saturday, September 7, a session called the "flag panel" took place, drawing an estimated 1,500 attendees. A tradition at the conferences, it consisted of a panel of flag officers answering questions on any topic from attendees. The 1991 session was chaired by the senior naval aviator (officially titled the Assistant Chief of Naval Operations (Air Warfare)), Vice Admiral Richard Dunleavy, accompanied by seven other admirals and one Marine general. The panel was moderated by Captain Frederic Ludwig, President of the Tailhook Association. During the session, a woman in attendance asked Dunleavy when women would be allowed to fly in combat jets. Her question was greeted with jeers and derisive laughter from the crowd. Dunleavy replied, "If Congress directs SecNav (the secretary of the Navy) to allow qualified women to fly combat aircraft, we will comply," which drew more boisterous boos and catcalls from the audience. The convention's formal agenda ended early that evening with a banquet, attended by about 800 people, in which Secretary of the Navy Henry L. Garrett III gave a speech.

=== Gauntlet and other incidents ===
According to witnesses, the gauntlet was in full swing by 10 p.m. on Saturday, September 7. Throngs of men lined the third-floor hospitality suite hallway groping women who entered the corridor. Men at each end of the hallway would signal that a woman was approaching by pounding on the wall or waving their hands above their head, which signaled the men in the center of the hallway to move to the sides to allow the women to enter. Besides being touched on their buttocks, crotch, or breasts, some women had their shirts or blouses yanked off or up and/or were lifted up and carried through the crowd. Observers and participants reported that while some of the women seemed to enjoy or play along with it, other women angrily remonstrated against the treatment, and in some cases punched, kicked, bit, scratched, or threw drinks at the men who grabbed them. The women who objected or fought back were ignored, jeered, or had drinks thrown in their faces by the men.

Just after 11 p.m., a semi-conscious 18-year-old woman named Julia Rodgers (who publicly identified herself in media reports and whose name was unredacted in public military hearings and documents) was carried out of the HS-1 (Helicopter Anti-submarine Squadron 1 "Seahorses") suite and then passed along through the hallway while men removed her pants and underwear. Two Hilton security guards who had been observing the activities, but had not previously intervened, rushed over to help her, and the men in the hallway fled into the nearby hospitality suites. Once the security guards left with Rodgers, the men re-emerged and the gauntlet resumed.

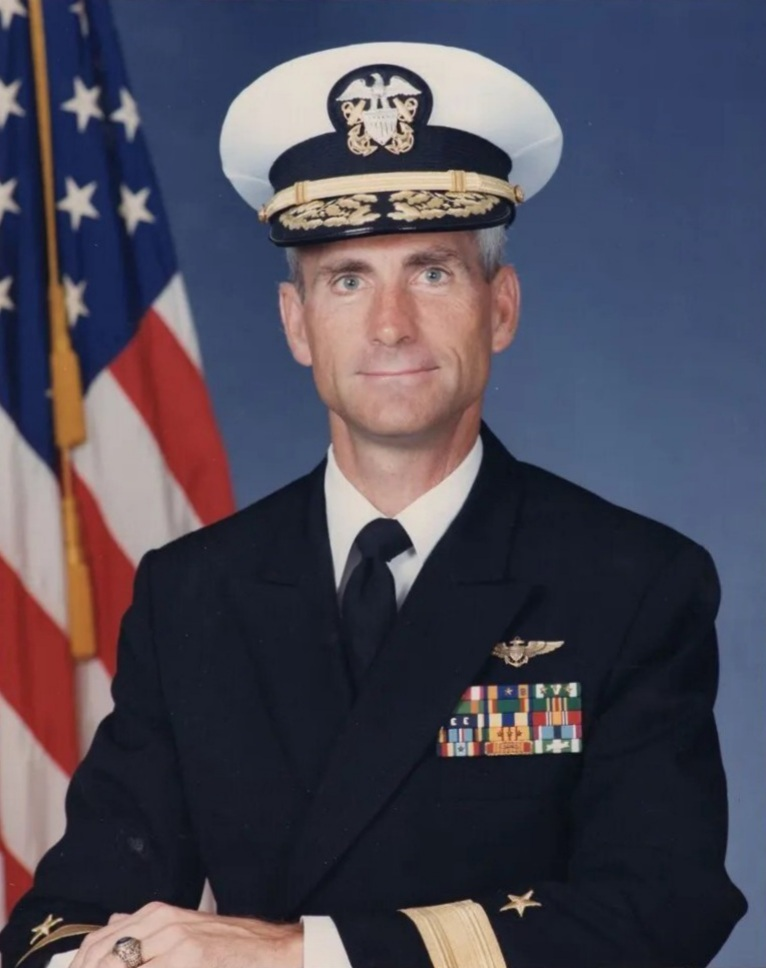
Rear Admiral Jack Snyder, commander of the Naval Air Test Center at Patuxent River

Around 11:30 p.m., Lieutenant Paula Coughlin emerged from the elevator into the third-floor hallway. Coughlin was a CH-53 helicopter pilot serving as an aide-de-camp to Rear Admiral Jack Snyder at Naval Air Station Patuxent River, Maryland. Searching for a familiar face, Coughlin began walking down the corridor. According to Coughlin, a man saw her and yelled "Admiral's aide!" and other men in the hallway joined in, repeating the phrase. Shortly thereafter, two men in succession lifted her from behind and propelled her forward. As Coughlin loudly objected, a man reached around from behind, embraced her in a tight bear hug, and placed his hands in her shirt as they slid to the floor. Coughlin bit his hands and arms and he released her. At that moment, someone reached into her crotch and yanked on her underwear. Breaking free again, Coughlin tried to enter the doorway of one of the hospitality suites, but two men standing nearby moved to block her way.

Proceeding down the hallway, Coughlin asked an older man for help, who responded by placing his hands on her breasts. Spotting a nearby doorway, Coughlin lunged inside and found the suite to be almost empty. She collapsed, weeping, into a chair. A few minutes later an officer acquaintance entered and Coughlin asked him, "Do you know what they're doing out there?" He responded, "You didn't go down the hallway, did you? Someone should have warned you. That's the gauntlet." Later that evening, Coughlin recounted the episode to two other officers she knew, and one of them accompanied her to the hallway to see if she could identify her attackers. By this time, however, the hallway was almost empty and Coughlin did not see anyone she recognized.

That same evening, according to witnesses, numerous men "ballwalked" around the pool patio. Just past midnight, Tailhook partiers in an eighth-floor room, "mooning" the spectators, accidentally pushed out a window, and the large pane of glass plummeted into the crowd around the pool and shattered on the concrete. The flying glass missed the "ballwalkers", but hit a college student in the head, giving her a concussion.

== Initial reactions ==
According to Coughlin, she told Snyder, first by telephone, and then in person at breakfast, about the assault the next morning of September 8, saying, "I was almost gang-banged last night by a bunch of fucking F-18 Hornet pilots." Snyder, she said, seemingly preoccupied by another matter and lost in thought, distractedly replied, "Paula, you need to stop hanging around with those guys. That's what you've got to expect on the third deck with a bunch of drunk aviators" and made no further comment.

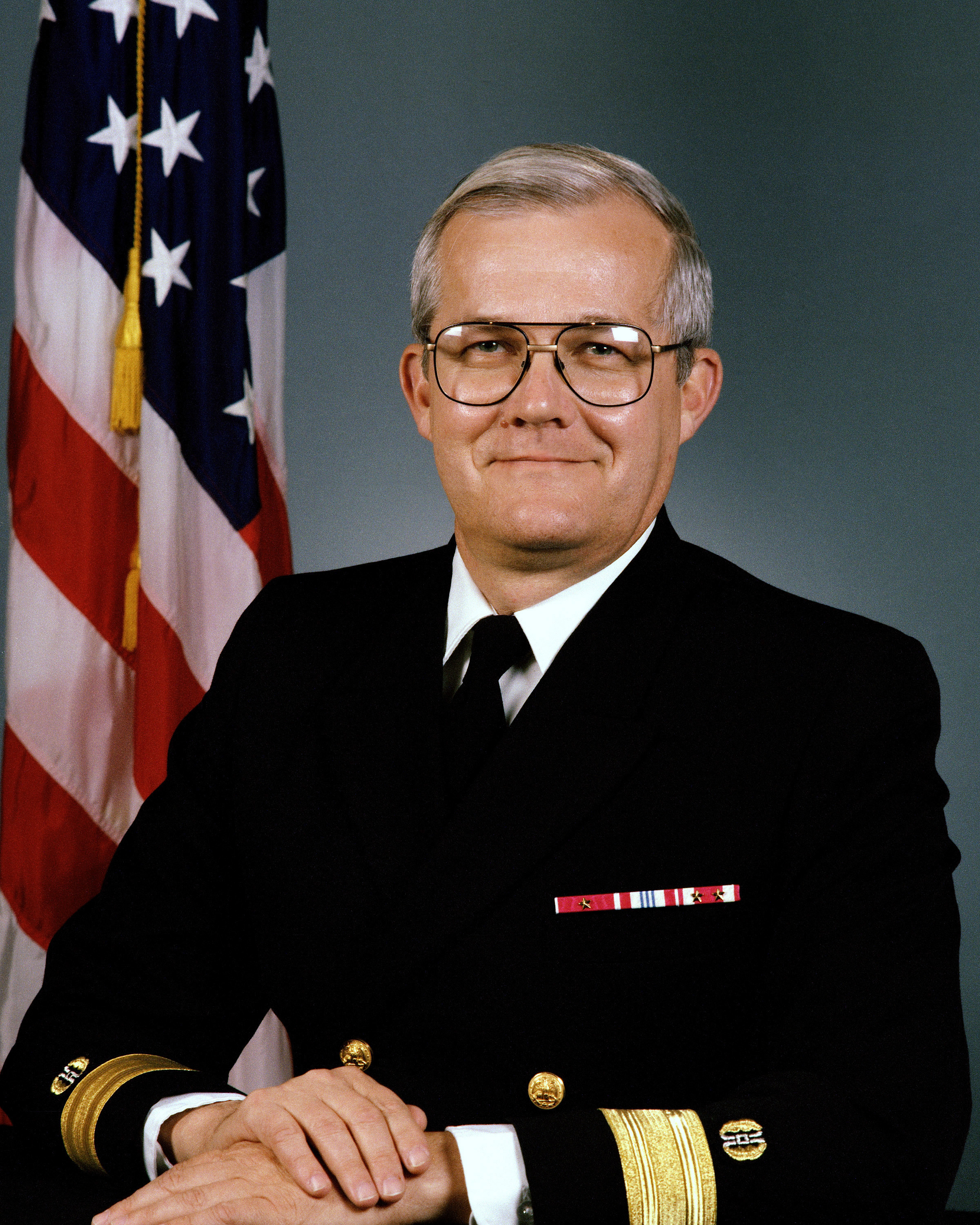
Rear Admiral Duvall Williams, commander of the Naval Investigative Service

On September 19, Captain Robert Parkinson, Snyder's chief of staff, and Coughlin met with Snyder in his office at Patuxent and Coughlin told him in detail about the assault. Snyder told Coughlin that he would call and inform Ludwig, Dunleavy, and his boss, Vice Admiral William C. Bowes, the head of the Naval Air Systems Command, about the situation and that he and Coughlin would write detailed letters which he would deliver to Dunleavy. When Coughlin learned on September 30 that the letters had not yet been delivered, she gave a copy of her letter to a staff member for the Chief of Naval Personnel/Deputy Chief of Naval Operations for Manpower, Vice Admiral Jeremy Michael Boorda. Boorda showed the letter to Dunleavy and Vice Chief of Naval Operations Jerome L. Johnson, who directed Rear Admiral Duvall Williams, commander of the Naval Investigative Service (NIS), to start a criminal inquiry. Dunleavy called Coughlin to tell her a formal investigation was being ordered, and told her that she would be transferred to Washington, D.C., to help with the probe. The investigation began on October 11, 1991.

Also on October 11, 1991, Ludwig mailed a letter to the participating Navy and Marine Corps squadrons. Ludwig's letter, which assessed the 1991 symposium, began by saying, "Without a doubt, it was the biggest and most successful Tailhook we have ever had. We said it would be the 'Mother of all Hooks,' and it was." Ludwig then added, "This year the total damage bill was $23,000. Finally, and most serious, was 'the Gauntlet' on the third floor. I have five separate reports of young ladies, several of whom had nothing to do with Tailhook, who were verbally abused, had drinks thrown on them, were physically abused and were sexually molested. Most distressing was the fact an underage young lady was severely intoxicated and had her clothing removed by members of the Gauntlet."

Gregory Vistica, a journalist with the San Diego Union obtained a copy of Ludwig's letter and, on October 29, 1991, his newspaper published an article on Tailhook 1991 titled, "Women reportedly abused by Navy pilots at seminar." The story, which was also distributed on that day's national newswires and by the Associated Press, was reprinted by newspapers across the United States. That afternoon, Senator John McCain, a former naval aviator, castigated the Navy from the Senate floor, calling for an immediate high-level investigation and for the Navy to end its relationship with the Tailhook Association. McCain later wrote a letter to Chairman of the Joint Chiefs of Staff Colin Powell and United States Secretary of Defense Dick Cheney requesting that an independent commission investigate the matter, but the DoD declined. The political climate at that moment may have contributed to the reaction to the story, as the contentious Clarence Thomas Supreme Court nomination hearings, involving allegations of sexual harassment, had concluded two weeks earlier.

Garrett ordered the service to cut its ties with the Tailhook Association and for the Naval Inspector General (NIG), led by Rear Admiral George W. Davis VI, to investigate the Navy's "business relationship" with the organization. He directed the NIS to dedicate more resources to its Tailhook inquiry. The NIS and NIG were instructed to jointly brief a senior Navy board on the progress of their investigations at weekly meetings. In addition to Williams and Davis, the board consisted of Undersecretary of the Navy J. Daniel Howard; Judge Advocate General of the Navy John E. Gordon; Pete Fagan, Garrett's personal lawyer; William J. Flanagan Jr., the Navy's congressional liaison; and the Assistant Secretary of the Navy (Manpower and Reserve Affairs), Barbara S. Pope.

On November 10, 1991, Snyder was relieved of command of the Patuxent River Naval Air Test Center by Kelso for not reacting quickly enough to Coughlin's initial complaint. Angered over the firing of Snyder, naval aviation officers began telling reporters that Garrett had been present at Tailhook and had been made aware of the September 7 gauntlet incident by the next day. Although Dunleavy and Ludwig were aware of the gauntlet assaults by the next day, however, there is no recorded evidence that they told Garrett or Kelso about them before Ludwig's October 11 letter.

== Navy investigations and response ==
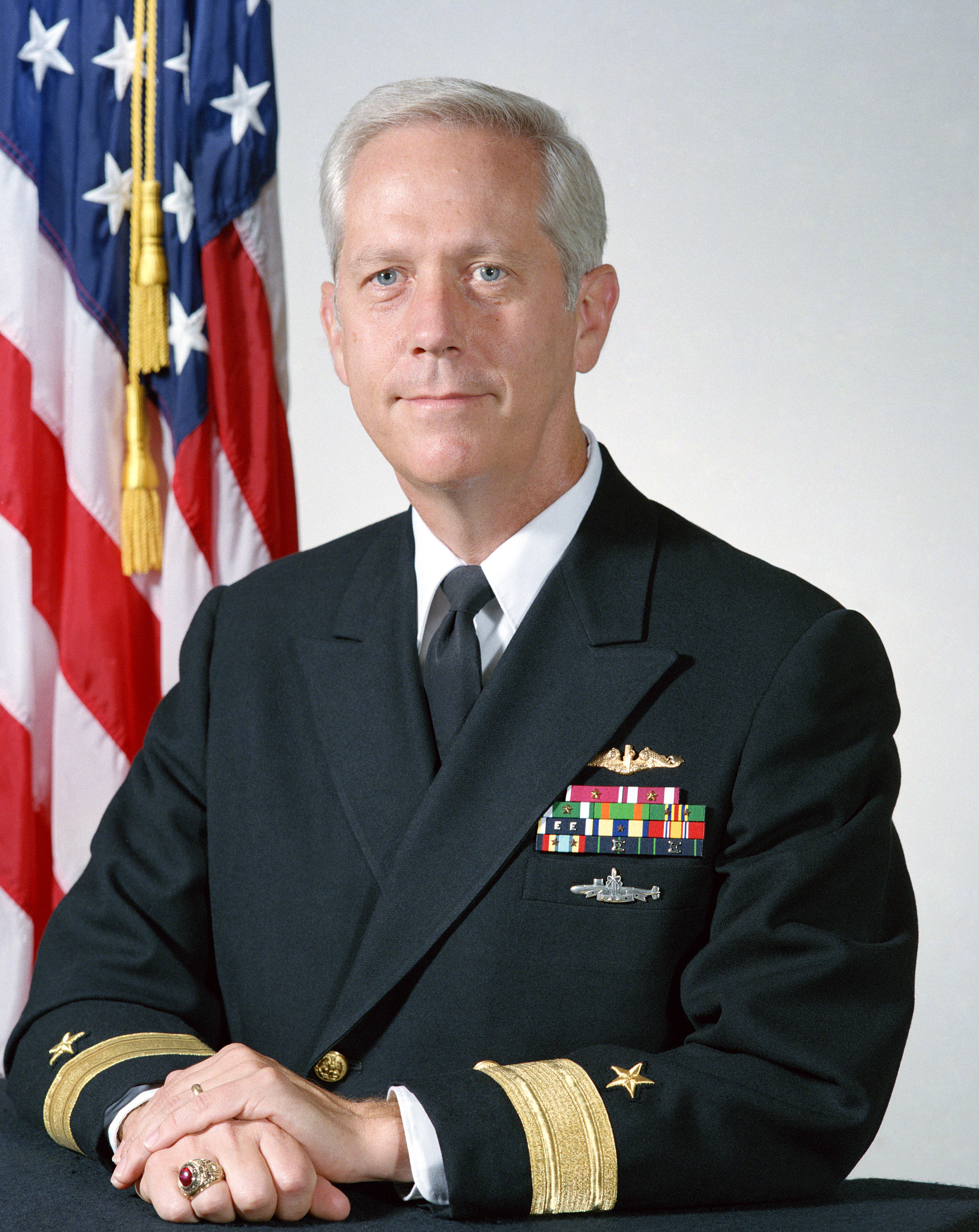
Rear Admiral George W. Davis VI led the Naval Inspector General investigation

Davis' IG investigation was completed on April 28, 1992. The report did not blame any individuals by name, but it found "a marked absence of moral courage and personal integrity" in the officers interviewed, whom investigators faulted for failing to accept responsibility for their actions. The report stated that the naval officers involved felt that the women who attended Tailhook "should have expected and accepted" the treatment they received and that there was a "long-standing, continued abuse and glamorization of alcohol within the naval aviation community." The report noted that of the 1,730 passengers ferried to Las Vegas on military aircraft for the convention, only 100 were traveling on official orders, which are required for that type of travel.

The NIS investigation was also completed on April 28, 1992 and stated that it had identified 25 victims of sexual assaults that had occurred at the convention. Four suspects were identified: Marine Captain Gregory Bonam for the assault on Coughlin, Marine Lieutenant Colonel Michael S. Fagan for obstruction of justice and making false official statements, Navy Lieutenant Michael Clancy for helping organize the gauntlet, and Royal Australian Air Force officer Jim Ibbottson for biting women's buttocks (but not for the assault on Coughlin). After the U.S. government informed Australian authorities of the allegations against him, Ibbottson was given an official letter of censure. He later committed suicide.

Several members of Congress, including Sam Nunn, John Glenn (a former Marine Corps aviator), Barbara Boxer, and Pat Schroeder, were dismayed with the limited scope and results of the NIS investigation, which appeared to have avoided any inquiry into the culpability of commanders or other higher-ranked officers in the incident. Schroeder was especially angered when, after the reports were released, some Navy and Marine officers, including Marine General Royal N. Moore Jr., sent a message to the aviation community asking for nominations for the "prestigious Tailhook award" after she had been led to believe that the Navy had broken its ties with Tailhook. NIS agents had not interviewed any of the commanders of the squadrons which had operated hospitality suites nor any of the flag officers who had attended the convention. In response, on May 27, 1992, the Senate Armed Services Committee (SASC) directed the DoD to discipline the involved squadron commanders and that all pending Navy and Marine Corps officer promotions were frozen until the DoD provided a list to the Committee of every officer who had misbehaved at Tailhook.

Angered by the SASC's decision to freeze the promotions for almost 5,000 Naval and Marine officers, Garrett told Cheney that he wanted to try to convince the SASC members to change their minds. Cheney forbade Garrett from that course of action, telling him to instead fix the problems with the Navy's investigation as the SASC was requesting. On June 2, 1992, Garrett told the Office of the General Counsel of the Navy (OGC), to take over the Tailhook investigation. The General Counsel of the Navy, Craig S. King, ordered two of his attorneys to review the NIG and NIS investigation reports and identify the squadron commanders and any other officers who should be questioned under the expanded investigation.

Around the same time, the New York Times asked the offices of Garrett and Kelso if they had been at Tailhook and/or on the third floor hospitality suite area on the evening of September 7–8, 1991. Garrett responded by publicly declaring that he had not visited the hospitality suites on the night in question. OGC attorneys rechecked the investigation interview summaries, and found that a witness had testified to seeing Garrett together with Vice Admiral John H. Fetterman Jr., commander of the Naval Education and Training Command, in the HS-1 suite and the nearby VMFP-3 "Rhinos" suite. The report of Garrett's presence in the suites had not been included in the final NIS report. On June 9, 1992, Garrett released a press statement saying that he had gone to one party suite at Tailhook, but only briefly to "grab a beer." On June 12, Garrett offered his resignation to Cheney, who refused it.

== DoD investigation ==
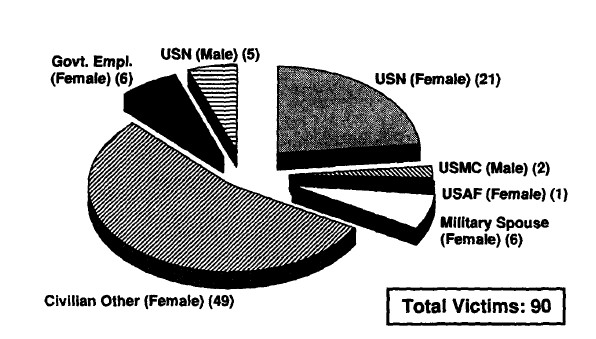
Victims of Tailhook assaults. They aged between 18 and 48.

Dissatisfied with the Navy's handling of the matter, members of the U.S. House and Senate began calling for independent hearings on Tailhook. In response, on June 18, 1992, Garrett decided to hand the matter over to the DoD's Inspector General (DoDIG) and its criminal investigative division, the Defense Criminal Investigative Service (DCIS). On June 24, 1992, the Washington Post published a story, with Coughlin's cooperation, on her experience at Tailhook. That evening and the next, ABC World News Tonight broadcast a two-part interview of Coughlin conducted by Peter Jennings. President George H. W. Bush watched the interview from the White House. On June 26, 1992, Cheney informed Garrett that he had decided to accept his resignation. Kelso also offered to resign, but Cheney refused to accept it. That same day, Coughlin visited the White House at President Bush's invitation, where he assured her that justice would be done.

In July 1992, Sean O'Keefe was appointed acting Secretary of the Navy and Howard was retained as undersecretary. On July 2, 1992, Congress eliminated funding for 10,000 administrative personnel from the Navy's 1993 budget in protest over Tailhook. The Tailhook Association canceled its 1992 conference and the Las Vegas Hilton announced in August 1992 that Tailhook was banned from its property.

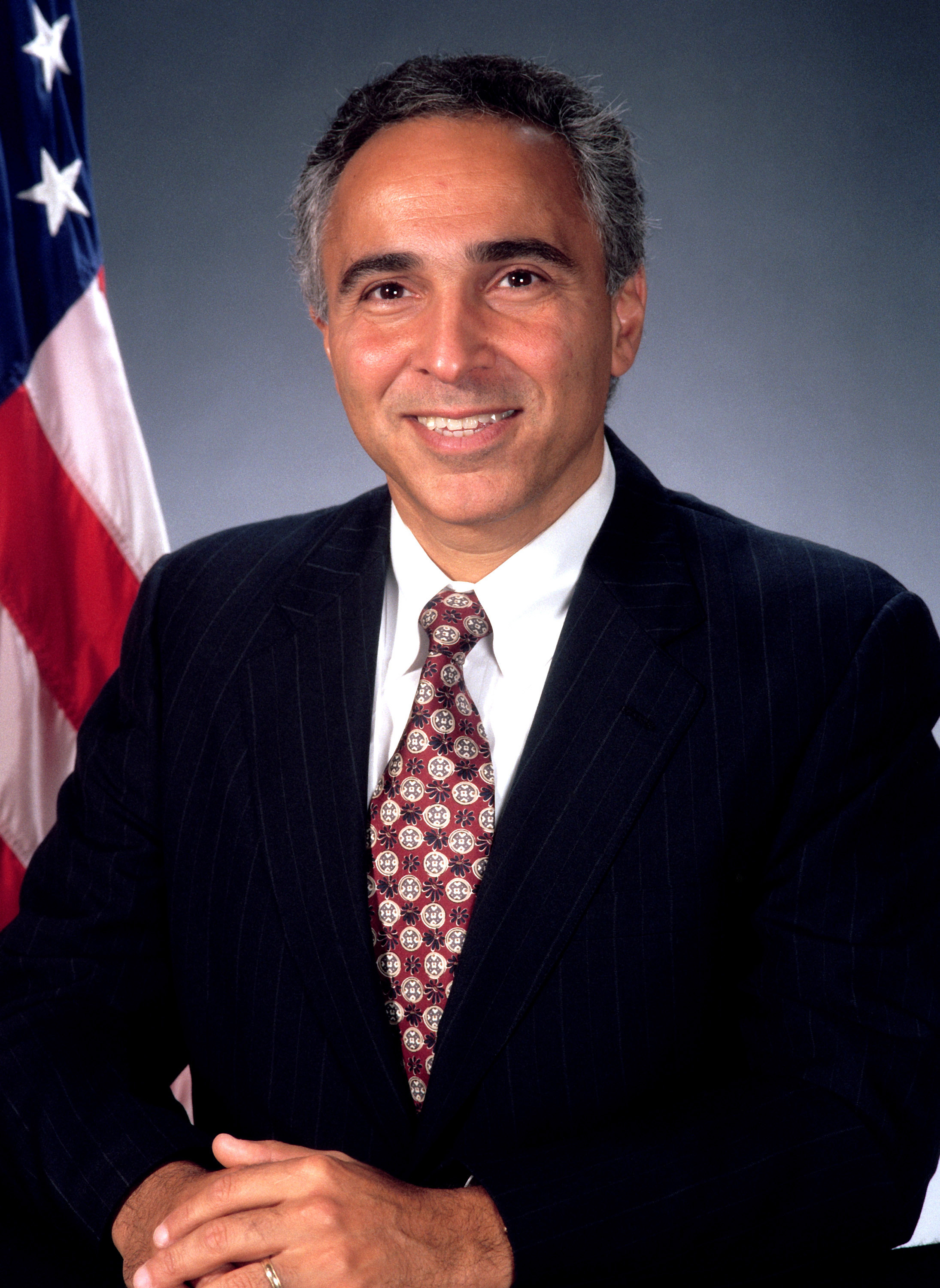
DCIS senior agent Donald Mancuso

Acting DoD Inspector General Derek J. Vander Schaaf and DCIS senior agent Don Mancuso gave their investigative agents a wide scope for their inquiry and encouraged them to be more aggressive than naval investigators had been. Navy and Marine Corps personnel involved or targeted in the investigation subsequently alleged that DCIS agents used unethical and unprofessional interrogation and investigative tactics. The methods reportedly included physical intimidation, lying, trickery, badgering, harassment, innuendo, and false accusations as well as standard law enforcement techniques like "good cop/bad cop." In some cases, DCIS agents purportedly tried to involve officers' wives in the interrogations, forbade officers from having legal representation present, made false promises of immunity, forced polygraph examinations, asked questions about their sex lives, threatened tax audits, and neglected to read interviewees their rights, as required in military criminal investigations. For their part, DCIS agents were angered and frustrated by what they viewed as insincere, deceitful, evasive, and dishonest responses from many of the Navy and Marine officers they interviewed.

Citing the cost of professional transcription, DCIS elected not to tape-record most of the interviews and interrogations, instead instructing agents to type their own interview notes. The lack of recordings of the interviews would later be problematic for military prosecutors.

On September 24, 1992, DoDIG released the first part of its report, which focused on the failings of the NIS and NIG investigations. In response to its findings, O'Keefe relieved Williams and Gordon and directed their retirement (at current rank) from the Navy. Davis was also relieved, but allowed to continue in service. Howard was reprimanded for "failure to provide effective leadership" and "abrogation of responsibility." O'Keefe placed the NIS (soon renamed NCIS – Naval Criminal Investigative Service) permanently under civilian control.

The second, and final, portion of the DoDIG investigation was publicly released on April 23, 1993, although the report had been completed in February 1993. The delay in releasing the report was to await the appointment of the replacement for O'Keefe, John Howard Dalton, as Secretary of the Navy. The report catalogued a litany of offenses committed by military officers at Tailhook '91, including assaults, indecent exposure, lewd behavior, and public drunkenness. The investigation concluded that 83 women and seven men had been assaulted, sexually or otherwise, at the conference. It reported that 23 officers were implicated in the assaults, 23 had committed indecent exposure, and 51 had subsequently lied to investigators. At the Pentagon press conference presenting the findings, Kelso stated that, "we had an institutional problem in how we treat women" and called the report, "a valuable teaching tool."

== Nonjudicial actions ==
=== Cases ===
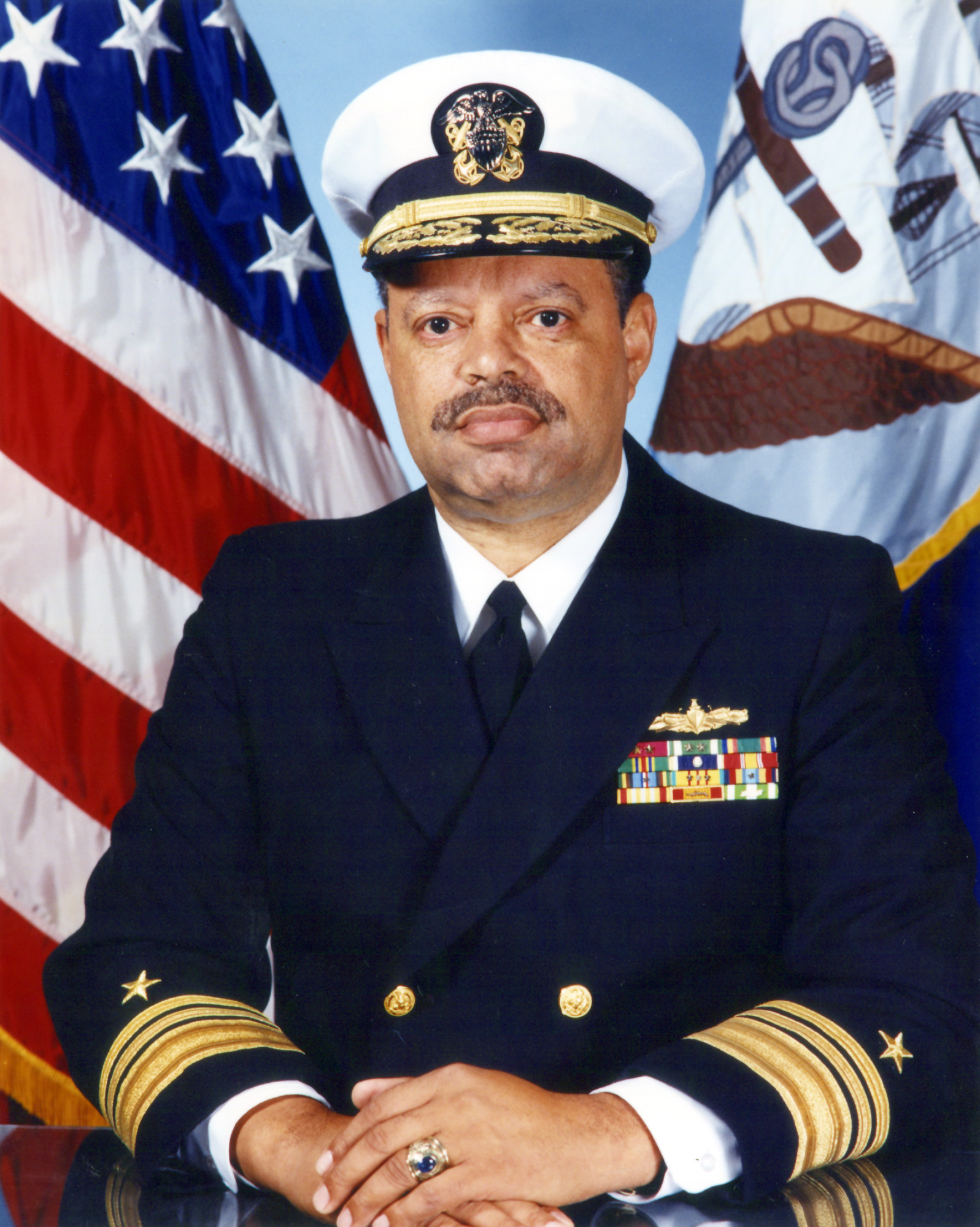
The Navy CDA was led by Commander, Naval Surface Force Atlantic Vice Admiral J. Paul Reason

In late 1992, as the DoDIG investigation progressed, O'Keefe approved prosecutions of Tailhook suspects under what was called a "consolidated disposition authority" (CDA). Customarily, in the U.S. military, discipline is handled by the local chain of command. Under a CDA, however, all prosecutions over a specific incident or matter are handled by the same convening authority. The purpose was to make any punishments more consistent, and to avoid conflicts of interest that could arise if local chains of command included senior officers who had also attended Tailhook.

The Department of the Navy established separate CDA's for Navy and Marine officers. The Navy CDA, established on January 30, 1993, was headed by Commander, Naval Surface Force Atlantic Vice Admiral J. Paul Reason. Reason's legal team worked from Naval Amphibious Base Little Creek and hearings were held at Naval Station Norfolk.

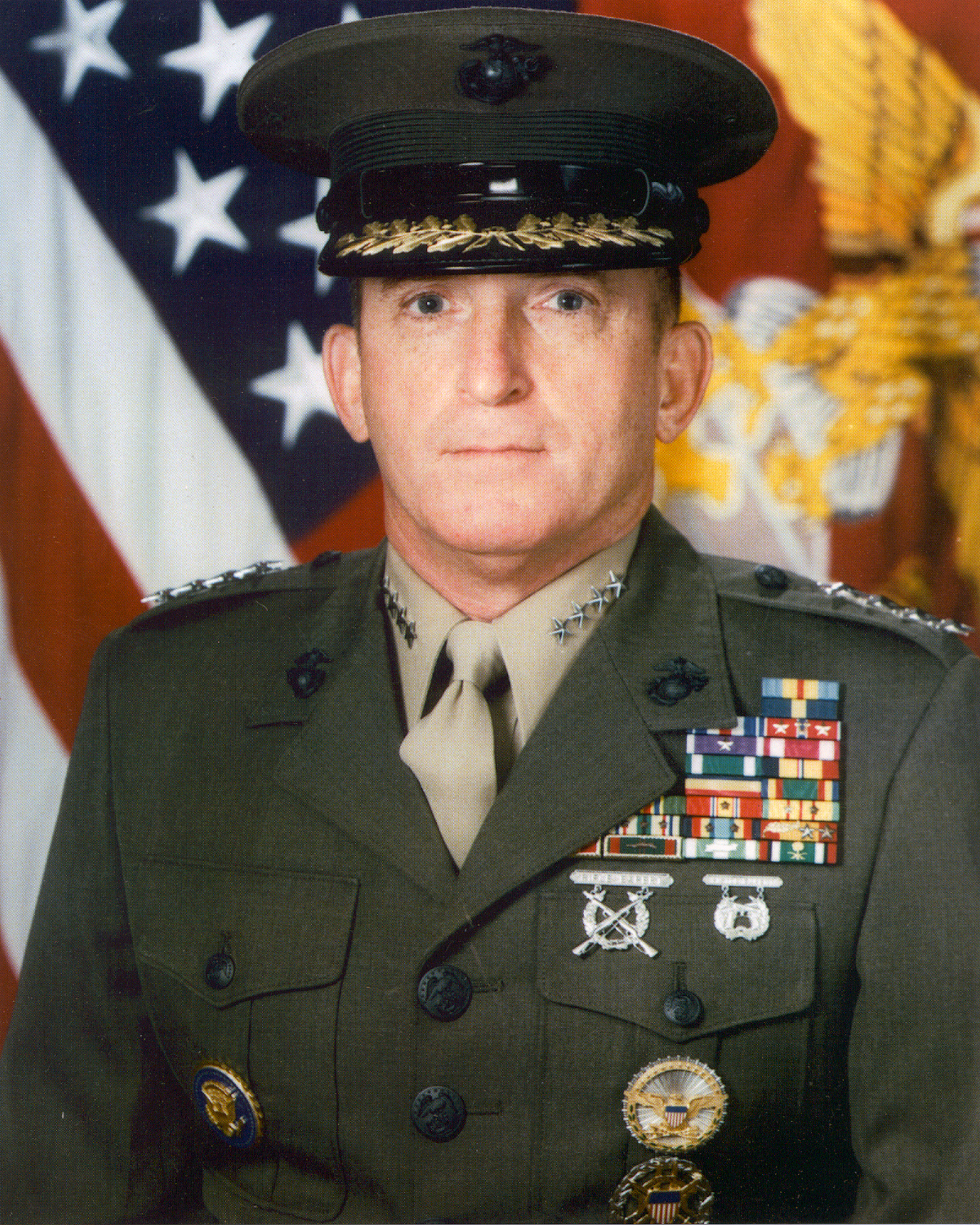
The Marine CDA was presided over by Lieutenant General Charles C. Krulak

The Marine CDA, stood up on February 4, 1993, was presided over by Lieutenant General Charles C. Krulak and located at Marine Corps Base Quantico.

On February 23, 1993, although its investigation had not officially closed, the DoDIG agreed to deliver its Tailhook case files to Navy attorneys to review in preparation for prosecutions. At that time, the DoDIG/DCIS had compiled files on 300 officers. The DoDIG considered 160 of the cases as not worthy of prosecution and held onto them for the time being before giving them to the Navy in May 1993. Of the remaining 140 suspects whose files were turned over in February, 118 were Navy officers and 22 were Marines. The DoDIG also had 35 files on the flag officers who had attended Tailhook 1991 that it kept separate from the other 300 cases.

Reports differ on what happened to the 35 flag officer files. Mancuso stated that the files were delivered to Kelso's office (who at that time was acting Secretary of the Navy), but Kelso's staff claimed that the files were kept by the office of Secretary of Defense Les Aspin. The location of the flag officer files was a sensitive issue, as one of the cases involved Kelso.

=== Actions ===
Navy attorneys quickly dropped 12 of the cases as too weak for prosecution. On May 10–11, 1993, Reason was briefed on the remaining 106 cases by an executive panel of non-attorney Navy captains (O-6s) who had themselves been briefed on the cases by the reviewing prosecutorial team at Little Creek. Reason decided not to pursue about 50 of the cases, citing a lack of convincing evidence. For the remainder, Reason offered admiral's mast to those officers for which there was no evidence of sexual assault.

Forty-two officers, most of whom were charged with indecent exposure (officially designated as "conduct unbecoming" under the Uniform Code of Military Justice) for "ballwalking" or streaking, and/or false official statements, accepted admiral's mast. At the masts, two were exonerated and 12 received nonpunitive letters or counseling which were not recorded in their permanent record. The other 28 officers received fines between $500–2,000 and/or were issued permanent, punitive letters of admonition or reprimand, which likely ended further opportunities for promotion. Thirty of the officers were subsequently given grants of immunity by Navy prosecutors who hoped to use them as witnesses in the pending courts-martial.

Four naval officers had rejected their May 1993 offers from Reason to go to admiral's mast. Reason was advised by his legal team that the cases for two of the officers, Commanders Gregory Peairs and Robert Yakely, were too weak for trial prosecutions. Reason, who wanted to see the two punished in some way, asked new Navy Secretary John Howard Dalton to issue them letters of censure. Reason also wanted letters of censure for three other officers (Frederic Ludwig, Robert E. Stumpf, and Richard F. Braden) that he had decided not to offer nonjudicial punishment to but who his legal team also said had cases that were too weak for trial. Peairs and Yakeley were accused of indecent exposure, Braden of witnessing the gauntlet and not intervening, Stumpf of allowing lewd acts to occur in his squadron's suite, and Ludwig for his role in planning and directing the convention. The Vice Chief of Naval Operations, Admiral Stanley R. Arthur, a naval aviator, rejected Reason's request and ordered the cases disposed of within his CDA.

In response, Reason ordered all five to meet "fact-finding boards", composed of a two-star admiral and two captains, who would re-investigate their cases and recommend a course of action. The boards cleared all five of wrongdoing by the end of October 1993 and they received no punitive action from Reason.

The Marine hearings, called "office hours" in Marine jargon, with Krulak at Quantico commenced the third week of June 1993. Marine prosecutors dropped three cases. Of the remaining 19, two were held for referral to courts-martial and the others were offered nonjudicial punishment. Krulak exonerated six and gave the other 11 fines and punitive letters.

== Further prosecutions ==
=== Marine Corps ===
One of the two Marine officers referred for courts-martial was Gregory Bonam, the only individual prosecuted for the assault on Coughlin. Bonam's article 32 hearing (the military equivalent of a preliminary hearing) began on August 17, 1993 at Marine Corps Combat Development Command headquarters in Quantico. The hearing was presided over by Colonel Steven S. Mitchell, a Marine Corps Reserve judge. Coughlin testified at the hearing and admitted that she had had difficulty in identifying Bonam as her assailant. Bonam also testified and denied assaulting Coughlin.

After resuming on October 14, 1993, James T. Kelly, a civilian employee at Patuxent and Navy Reserve P-3 tactical coordinator who attended Tailhook '91, testified at the hearing that he had witnessed the assaults on Rodgers and Coughlin. Kelly's description of Coughlin's assailant differed from hers. Coughlin remembered a tall, black male, which matched Bonam, but Kelly described the perpetrator as shorter and with lighter-colored skin. After Kelly, two additional witnesses provided alibis for Bonam, testifying that he had been outside near the pool at the time of the assault on Coughlin. The next day, Mitchell recommended dismissing the charges against Bonam and, on October 21, 1993, Krulak concurred, ending the case.

The charges against the other Marine officer referred for courts-martial, Lieutenant Colonel Cass D. Howell, were also eventually dismissed. The charges had included sexual harassment, conduct unbecoming an officer, false swearing, obstruction of justice, and adultery (for allegedly sharing a room at Tailhook with a mistress). No Article 32 hearing was held.

=== Navy ===
==== Court trials begin ====
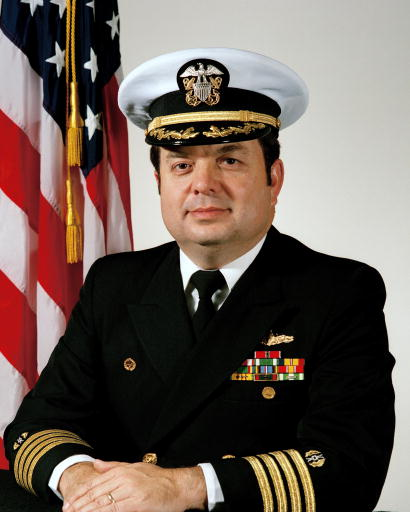
Presiding judge, Captain William T. Vest

The Navy ultimately referred five officers for courts-martial. Lieutenants Cole Cowden and Rolando Diaz were originally offered admiral's mast, but rejected the option. Commanders Thomas Miller and Gregory Tritt were referred directly to courts-martial without being offered a mast. Lieutenant David Samples had accepted and received punitive mast action from Reason, but was subsequently charged with additional, more serious offenses. The presiding judge during the prosecution of all five was Captain William T. Vest, a 29-year Navy veteran. He was assisted by Commander Larry McCullough.

Cowden was charged with sexual assault on a female Navy officer (not Coughlin) and for conduct unbecoming an officer. The conduct unbecoming charge was supported by a photograph taken at the convention in which Cowden posed with his tongue on the chest of a civilian woman. Cowden's article 32 hearing convened on July 15, 1993 and his defense attorney effectively attacked the credibility of the accuser, whose account of the assault had changed over time and who admitted to lying to investigators. Evidence was also presented that the woman in the photo was not offended and did not consider herself to be a victim. After the hearing, McCullough recommended that both charges be dropped. Reason, however, based on advice given him by his staff judge advocate Captain Jeffry Williams, dropped the sexual assault charge but decided to proceed with a general courts-martial for conduct unbecoming. On September 10, 1993, acting on a motion from Cowden's attorney, Vest ruled that Williams "had exceeded permissible bounds of his official role as a legal advisor" and disqualified him from the case. Williams' replacement, Commander Thomas R. Taylor, recommended dismissing all charges against Cowden and Reason concurred, ending the case.

Diaz was charged with disobeying an order and conduct unbecoming. At the 1990 and 1991 Tailhook conventions, Diaz led a voyeuristic activity in the suite for the VAW-110 squadron in which he shaved the bare legs of female participants. Reportedly, the shaving was popular and there was usually no shortage of female volunteers, nor onlookers. Diaz's shaving booth was located next to the suite's sliding glass doors, making the activity visible to onlookers outside on the pool patio. The squadron's commander, Christopher Remshak, testified that he had ordered Diaz not to shave any women's legs above mid-thigh. Diaz did not comply with the alleged order, in some cases giving women "bikini shaves", at their request or with their consent, all the way to their pubic zones.

At his article 32 hearing on August 3, 1993, Diaz told the court that Remshak had never given him such an order, and if he had it did not matter because senior officers, including Dunleavy, Vice Admiral Edwin R. Kohn Jr., and Kelso, had witnessed the activity and had tacitly approved it by not intervening. Diaz questioned why, if the activity was wrong, were women officers, including, he claimed, Paula Coughlin, who had received leg shaves, not being charged. Prosecutors subsequently dropped the charge of disobeying the order but directed Diaz to be court-martialed for conduct unbecoming for the bikini shaves. On September 24, 1993, Diaz accepted an admiral's mast over the charge, and Reason issued him a $1,000 fine and a punitive letter of reprimand.

Diaz's claim that Kelso had witnessed his leg-shaving show received heavy media attention. In response to Diaz's statement on August 3, the Office of the Chief of Naval Information issued a press release saying that at the '91 convention Kelso "did not visit any of the squadron suites, nor did he see or hear of any misconduct or inappropriate behavior. Admiral Kelso testified under oath that the only time he spent on the third floor of the Las Vegas Hilton was in the pool/patio area on Friday evening, when he spent about forty minutes visiting with naval aviators."

==== Tritt, Miller, and Samples ====
Tritt, second-in-command of the VAQ-139 squadron at the time of Tailhook '91, was charged with sexual assault for allegedly groping three women in a "mini-gauntlet" on the Hilton pool patio outside of the VAQ-129 squadron's suite, with conduct unbecoming for encouraging others to do the same or for failing to intervene when others were doing the same, for lying and/or making a false official statement, and for telling his squadron members to also lie to officials. Only one of Tritt's alleged groping victims had come forward.

During Tritt's Article 32 hearing, held from July 7 – August 25, 1993, his defense attorney questioned the alleged assault victim, a female Navy officer, who had been unable to positively identify her assailant, and the witnesses who Navy prosecutors had said had seen Tritt grope two other women. Under questioning in court, the witnesses admitted that they had not actually seen Tritt grope anyone. In September, McCullough recommended dropping all three assault charges and the conduct unbecoming charge. On October 30, 1993, the Navy dropped the assault charges, but continued to prosecute Tritt on one count of making a false official statement.

Thomas Miller, commander of VAQ-139, initially faced nine charges: six counts of conduct unbecoming, two counts of obstruction of justice, and one count of dereliction of duty. Miller was accused of giving his Hilton room key to one of his married subordinates at the '91 convention and telling him to take a woman, who was not his wife, to the room to have sex. He was also accused of telling his squadron members not to cooperate with investigators. Furthermore, Miller was alleged to have "ballwalked" on rooftops and golf courses in Singapore, Honolulu, and San Diego during a 1990 operational cruise on the carrier USS Independence. Finally, prosecutors alleged that Miller had been aware of other sexual misconduct at the convention, such as the "mini-gauntlet" that Tritt was accused of participation in, and had failed to try to stop it. Most of the charges relied on the testimony of a single witness, Lieutenant Daniel F. Janssen, a subordinate member of Miller's squadron, who had been granted immunity.

Samples had received his admiral's mast from Reason on June 2, 1993 for making a false official statement and had been fined $2,000 and given a punitive letter of admonition. As with other officers, Samples was given a grant of immunity after his mast hearing by Navy prosecutors, who were hoping he would incriminate other officers. Shortly thereafter, Navy prosecutors discovered statements from witnesses who said they had seen Samples involved in the gauntlet assault on Rodgers. Based on the new testimony, Samples was charged with indecent assault and lying under oath. The lying charge was dismissed on September 2, but the Navy proceeded with a court-martial for the assault charge. On October 27, 1993, Samples' trial was postponed while the United States Court of Military Appeals considered a motion to dismiss from the defense because, they argued, Samples' immunity agreement with prosecutors should have precluded further prosecution.

==== Flag officers disciplined ====
On July 21, 1993, Secretary of Defense Les Aspin transferred the case files on the 35 flag officers who had attended Tailhook '91 to the new Secretary of the Navy John Dalton and directed him to determine what disciplinary action, if any, should be taken. The 35 files included 30 active duty Navy, two Marine, and three Navy Reserve officers. On October 1, 1993, Dalton recommended to Aspin that 32 of the 35 officers receive formal reprimands. He also recommended that Kelso be relieved of his position.

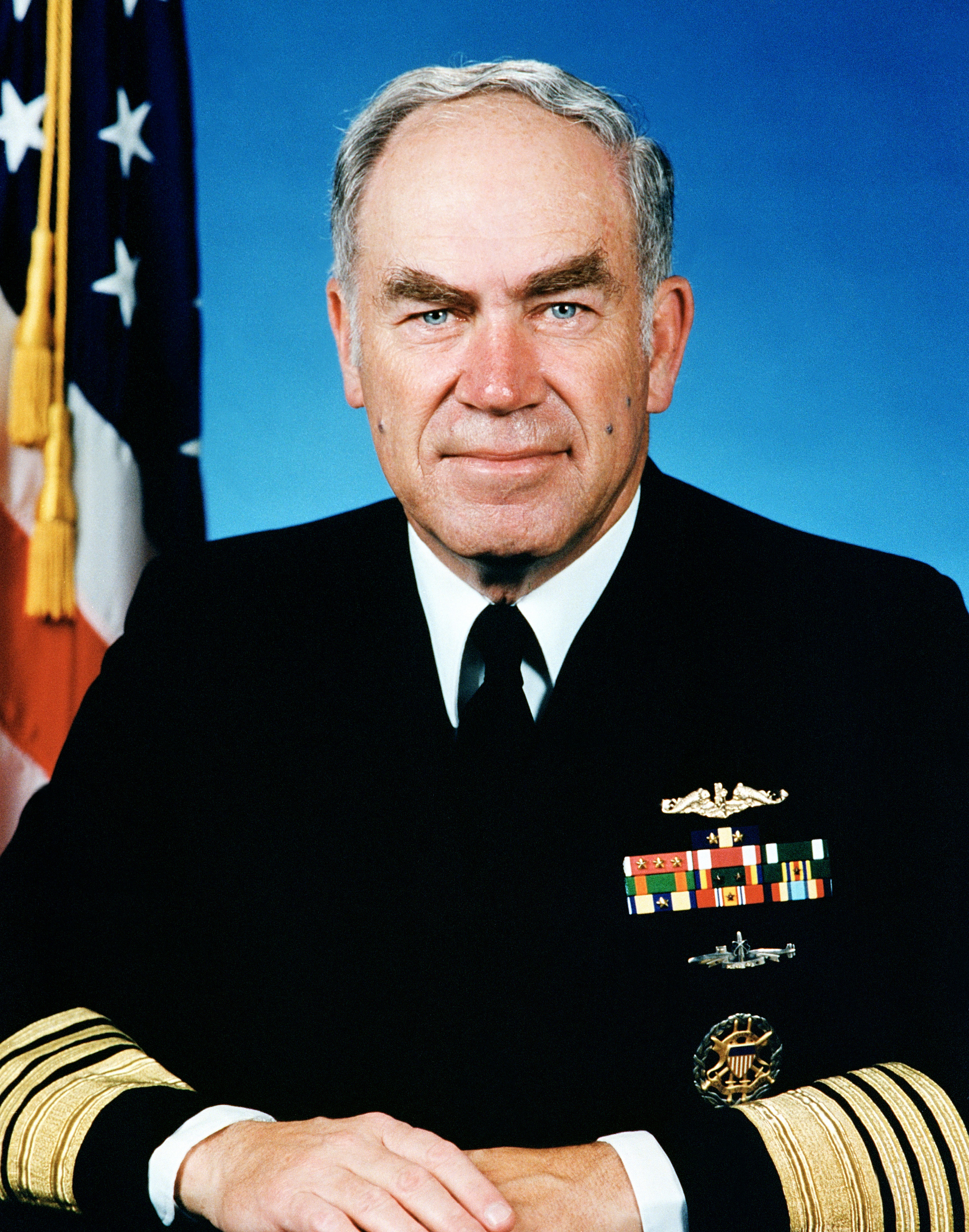
Frank Kelso

After consultation with President Bill Clinton, Aspin decided not to fire Kelso. Instead, on October 15, he gave Kelso and 29 of the other officers nonpunitive "letters of caution." Aspin issued secretarial letters of censure (equivalent to formal reprimands) to Dunleavy and rear admirals Riley Mixson and Wilson Flagg, Dunleavy's deputies. Aspin demoted Dunleavy (who had retired in July 1992) from three to two-star rank. The remaining two of the 35 officers were cleared of wrongdoing.

==== Kelso ruling and end of prosecutions ====
In mid-October 1993, the full DoDIG/DCIS Tailhook investigative database was provided to Tritt, Miller, and Samples' defense attorneys. During their examination of the files, the defense discovered that there were multiple witnesses who had seen Kelso in the Hilton suites and pool patio area on the Saturday night (September 7–8, 1991) in which their clients were accused of committing their offenses, contradicting Kelso's sworn statements to investigators (and public statements) that he had only visited that area the previous (Friday, September 6) night before.

As Miller's court-martial commenced on November 8, 1993, his defense attorney, Lieutenant Commander Wiliam C. Little, asked Vest to dismiss the charges because of unlawful command influence. As Little explained, by referring the charges against Miller, Kelso was acting as a command "accuser." If Kelso, however, himself was present in the vicinity of the alleged sexual assaults and other lewd behavior, he would have had the same duty as the other defendants to intervene to stop the behavior in question. By appointing Reason, junior to him, to oversee the judicial process, he was shielding himself from prosecution. Therefore, the circumstances indicated that Kelso could not lawfully act as an accuser commander, since he himself might be involved in the same, or related, crimes. Vest replied that, if true, the defense had a legitimate concern and requested witnesses to give evidence on whether Kelso had been present on the night in question. A week later, Tritt's attorneys made the same motion on behalf of their client and asked Vest to join their case with Miller's, to which Vest agreed. On January 11, 1994, Samples' appeal for dismissal on the basis of immunity was denied and, on January 28, Vest granted Samples' defense attorneys' motion to join his case with those of Miller and Tritt on the Kelso question.

From November 15 to December 17, 1993, a series of witnesses testified before Vest on whether or not they saw Kelso in the third floor party area on Saturday night at Tailhook '91. Several witnesses, including Kelso's two executive assistants, swore that Kelso had not been in that area on the night in question. A number of witnesses, mainly senior officers or members of Kelso's staff, who had previously provided sworn statements to DCIS agents stating that they had seen Kelso in the area on Saturday night recanted their statements in court, or said that they could now not remember what they had seen. Thirty-four witnesses, mainly junior and mid-level officers (O-5 and below), testified or provided sworn statements that they had seen Kelso in the suites or pool patio area on Saturday night around the same time that the crimes committed by Tritt, Miller, and Samples had allegedly occurred. The testimonies and statements of the 34 were generally consistent in their details.

Kelso testified before Vest on November 29, 1993. Under oath, he repeatedly denied going to the third floor on Saturday night. Kelso stated that he visited the pool patio area on Friday night, but did not enter any of the party suites. Outside the courtroom, Kelso repeated his denial to a group of reporters and media representatives. The next day, Dunleavy testified that he had not seen Kelso on Saturday night, but had accompanied Kelso into some of the hospitality suites on Friday night.

Based on the convincing nature of the testimonial evidence and the many corroborating facts and circumstances surrounding such evidence, this court finds Adm. Kelso is in error in his assertion that he did not visit the patio on Saturday evening. This court finds that Adm. Kelso manipulated the initial investigative process in a manner designed to shield his own personal involvement in Tailhook '91. This court specifically finds this inaction [to pursue accountability of flag officers] was part of a calculated effort to minimize the exposure of the involvement and personal conduct of flag officers and senior Department of Navy officials who were present at Tailhook '91. Any military commander convening a court-martial calling a subordinate to account for an act of misconduct must be free from any suspicion of involvement, directly or indirectly, in the same or any related act of misconduct. This is a matter of fundamental fairness.
Captain William T. Vest, February 8, 1994

On February 8, 1994, Vest issued his ruling. Vest concluded that Kelso, contrary to his sworn testimony, had been present on the Hilton third floor on the Saturday night in question (September 7–8, 1991). Vest stated that Kelso had formally acted in the role of "accuser" with regards to the Tailhook prosecutions and, "that there has been both actual and apparent unlawful command influence in each case." Vest dismissed the charges against Miller, Tritt, and Samples and disqualified Reason as the convening authority, effective the afternoon of February 11, 1994. The morning of February 11, Reason announced that he would take no further judicial action. At this point, the Navy's Tailhook prosecutions ended: the two-year statute of limitations had passed for nonjudicial/mast action on the charges against the three defendants.

== Aftermath ==
=== Personnel and promotions ===
On February 15, 1994, Kelso announced that he would leave his post and retire from the Navy two months early. Dalton and the new Defense Secretary William Perry lauded Kelso's character and service and, in Perry's case, criticized Vest's decision. The U.S. Senate voted 54–43 to allow Kelso to retain his 4-star rank and he formally retired on April 30, 1994. One of Kelso's last official acts as CNO was to approve the Navy's new, 64-page policy handbook on recognizing, preventing, and dealing with sexual harassment. Vest retired from the Navy in May 1994 and became an administrative law judge with the Social Security Administration.

Paula Coughlin resigned from the Navy on May 31, 1994. She sued the Las Vegas Hilton and the Tailhook Association. The Tailhook Association settled with her out of court for $400,000. The Las Vegas Hilton contested the lawsuit, and on October 28, 1994, a Nevada jury awarded Coughlin $1.7 million in compensatory damages and $5 million in punitive damages. Eight other women present at Tailhook '91 also sued the Tailhook Association and/or Hilton and received out-of-court settlements for undisclosed amounts.

Many, if not most, of the officers who had received punitive nonjudicial actions for Tailhook-related infractions, such as Diaz and Samples, separated from the active-duty Navy or Marines within a year or two of the end of the prosecutions in 1994. Tritt retired from the Navy on July 31, 1994 and became a flight instructor for a defense contractor. Miller and Cowden continued to serve on active duty. Fagan, one of the four named in the original Navy investigation, had received nonpunitive action from Krulak and was later promoted to Colonel (O-6). Ludwig retired from the Navy in May 1995. Bonam reportedly was denied promotion and left the Marines soon after.

Beginning in 1992, the Senate Armed Services Committee, which approved all field officer promotions O-4 and above, directed the Navy and Marines to include the complete investigation documentation for any promotion nominee who had been involved with Tailhook '91. The SASC then asked the Navy to hold the promotion for the affected officer until the SASC cleared the officer for advancement, sometimes delaying the promotion by a year or more. The SASC's actions may have been motivated by a desire from members of Congress to ensure that the Navy had held its officers adequately accountable for Tailhook transgressions. The Department of the Navy (which included the Marine Corps) used the list of 140 officers that the DoDIG had initially recommended for further investigation or prosecution as its baseline for compliance with the SASC order. In a few cases, anticipating pushback from the SASC over a promotion nomination, the Navy itself delayed or denied promotion to officers on the list, even though the officers had otherwise been exonerated.

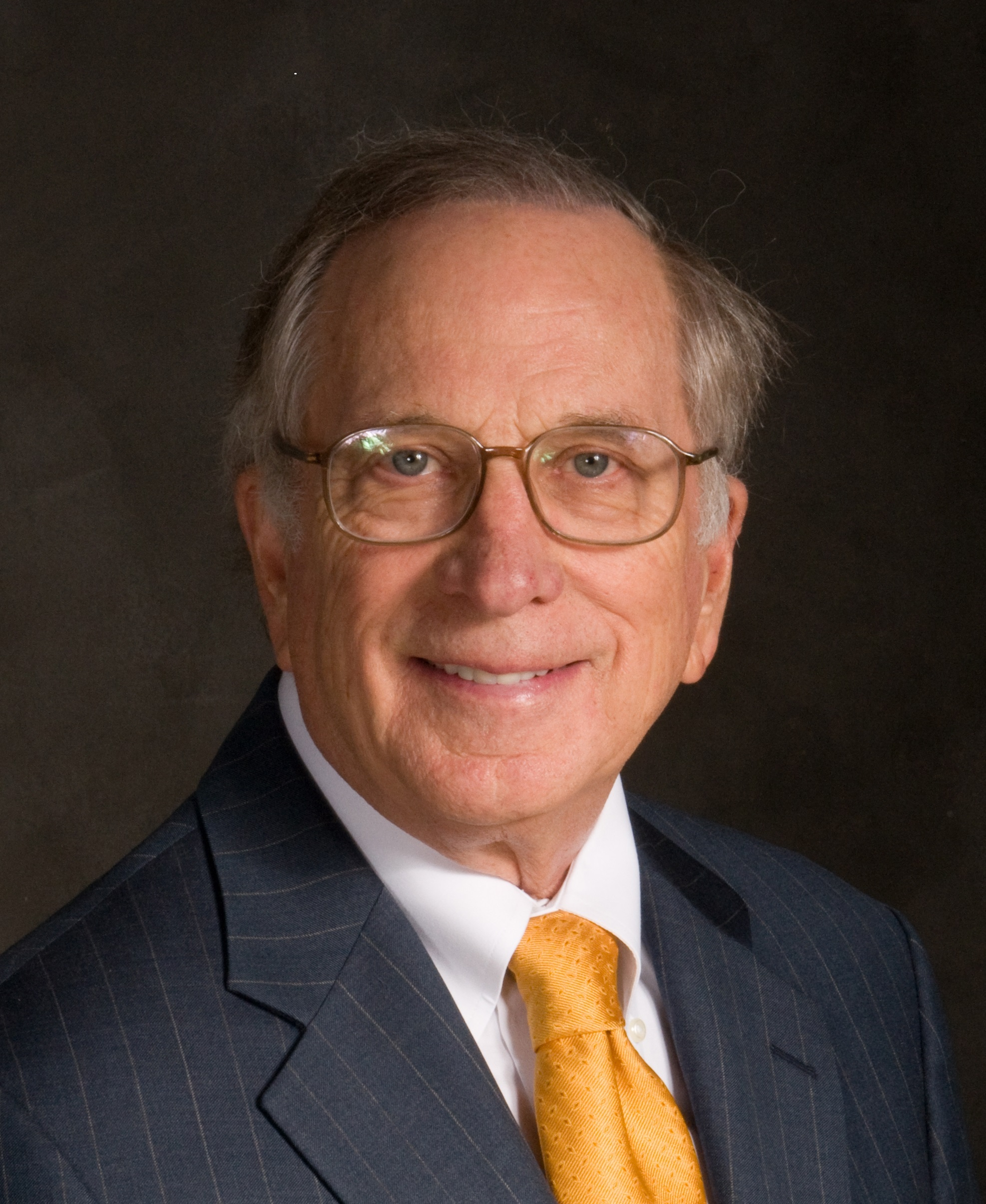
Senator Sam Nunn

The most public example of a cleared officer losing a promotion opportunity was that of Commander Robert Stumpf. A recipient of the Distinguished Flying Cross, six Air Medals, and three Navy Commendation Medals for combat missions he had flown against Libya in 1986 and during the Gulf War, Stumpf had been appointed to a prestigious position as squadron commander of the Blue Angels after being absolved of wrongdoing with Tailhook. Stumpf was initially approved for promotion to captain on May 24, 1994. The SASC, however, upon learning of his involvement with Tailhook, asked the Navy to delay his promotion until they could fully investigate Stumpf's record, and the Navy acquiesced. On November 13, 1995, Dalton removed Stumpf's name from the promotion list, telling the SASC that it was to "maintain the integrity of the promotion process." Stumpf unsuccessfully appealed the removal and retired from the Navy as a commander in October 1996.

The SASC's perceived intransigence over its promotion approvals for Tailhook-implicated, but cleared, officers like Stumpf drew criticism, including from former Navy Secretary Jim Webb and the editorial board of the Wall Street Journal. Sam Nunn, one of the senior members of the SASC, reacted angrily to the criticism in a hearing on March 12, 1996, saying, "What I deeply resent is the pounding this committee has taken on procedure, as if you've got some kind of McCarthy trial going on." Perhaps because of the criticism, the SASC accelerated its reviews of the officers' records. By July 1996, the SASC had reviewed the promotion recommendations for 39 Tailhook-linked officers, ultimately approving 31 of them while rejecting eight.

In July 2002, the George W. Bush administration awarded Stumpf, now working as a pilot for FedEx, the promotion to captain, effective July 1, 1995, and ordered that he receive back pay and updated retirement benefits. Of the retroactive promotion, Stumpf expressed the hope that "this is the beginning of a measured re-examination of the injustices accorded to hundreds of naval officers whose promising careers were terminated prematurely during the shameful political hysteria following the 1993 investigations."

=== Political and social impact ===
The Navy had been one of the first U.S. military services to begin integrating women into its ranks. In 1972, CNO Admiral Elmo Zumwalt opened up previously closed jobs to enlisted women, allowed non-medical women to serve on some non-combat ships, and suspended the restrictions on women receiving command assignments at land bases. According to journalist Gregory Vistica, since that time, and perhaps as a result of Zumwalt's changes, animosity towards the presence of women had grown in the Navy. He cited as evidence a 1986 study commissioned by the Navy to assess the assimilation of women into the United States Naval Academy. The study found that women at the academy had become increasingly more isolated and ostracized by their male peers in the years since 1976 when they were first admitted. Fearful of bad publicity, the Navy did not release the report's findings. In December 1990, male students (midshipmen) at the academy handcuffed one of their female classmates to a urinal in the men's bathroom and took photographs before releasing her. A subsequent Navy IG investigation found that, at the school, there was "a breakdown in civility and discipline, which contributes to an environment conducive to sexual harassment and discrimination."

The initial reports on the Tailhook investigation were released in 1992, which was a presidential election year in the U.S.. Due, in part, to the previous year's Clarence Thomas Supreme Court nomination hearings, sexual harassment was a prominent political topic. Also, a number of politicians and activists were calling on the U.S. military to end the ban on women's participation in combat occupations. Both issues were involved in the Tailhook controversy. Advocates for lifting the ban on women in combat argued that the restrictions placed women on an unequal footing with their male compatriots, thereby facilitating sexual harassment and sexist discrimination.

In response to Tailhook, Garrett had created a working group called the Standing Committee on Women in the Navy and Marine Corps. The board was chaired by Barbara Pope and included Marsha J. Evans. In September 1992, the committee made a list of 80 recommendations to improve how the Navy addressed women's issues, including a sexual harassment/assault hotline and education on alcohol abuse. O'Keefe approved all the recommendations.

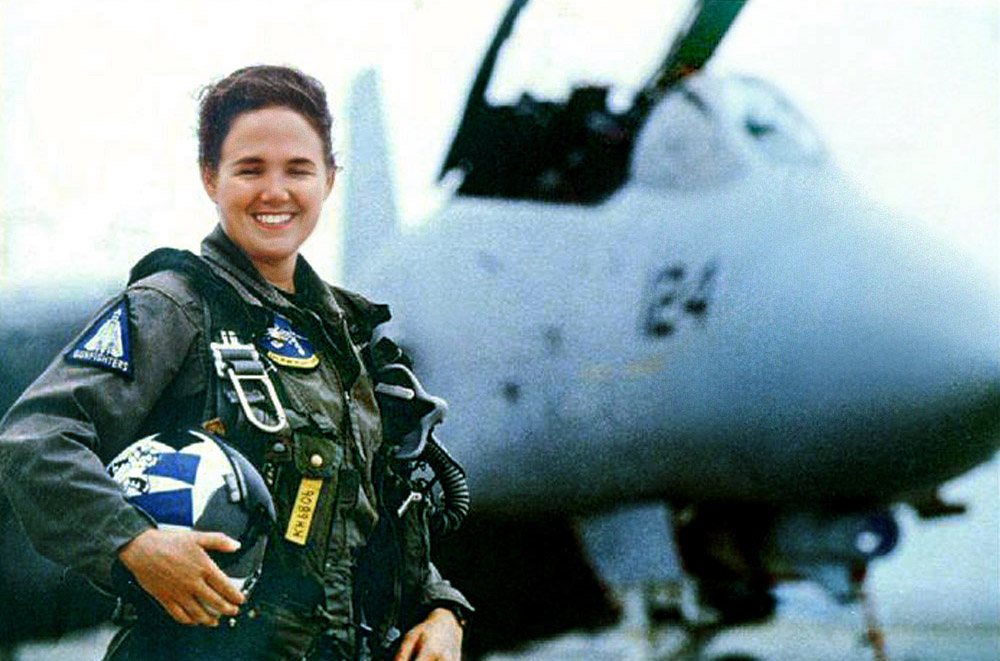
Kara Hultgreen

Congress, in July 1991, had lifted the restriction on women flying in combat aircraft (Section 502 of the Women's Armed Services Integration Act), but the services had not immediately taken action. In January 1993, Pope's committee met with O'Keefe and Kelso to push for the opening of combat jobs to women. On April 28, 1993, Aspin rescinded the Combat Exclusion Policy that kept women out of combat aircraft cockpits.

The Navy selected the USS Abraham Lincoln and Dwight D. Eisenhower as the first carriers to deploy with female combat aviators, and directed that female pilots be advanced in the training pipeline so that they would be eligible to serve on those ships. Two of the first female aviators selected to fly in Navy combat jets (F-14 Tomcat) were Kara Hultgreen and Carey Lohrenz. At the same time, the Air Force announced it was also admitting women into combat flying slots, and introduced Jeannie Leavitt and Sharon Preszler as its first female fighter pilots. On November 15, 1994, two women F/A-18 Hornet pilots from the Eisenhower made their first combat sortie, patrolling the southern no-fly zone over Iraq. In 1994, the USS The Sullivans, the first warship designed from the outset to accommodate both men and women sailors, was laid down. The ship launched and joined the fleet in 1997 with a mixed male and female crew.

Tailhook focused the U.S. military on the issue of sexual harassment and assault in its ranks. In 1996, for example, a DoD survey of 90,000 service members found that 55 percent of uniformed women had experienced sexual harassment at least once over the previous year. Embarrassed by these reports on the extent of the problem in their organizations, the U.S. military services made greater efforts to address the problem, including increased training and more severe prosecutions.

In a contrary view, critics alleged that sensitivity over Tailhook caused excessive political correctness or "witch hunts" to be involved in U.S. military decision-making. One example cited was Lieutenant Rebecca Hansen, who washed out of Navy flight school in 1993 and alleged that she was the victim of sexual harassment at the school. Vice Chief of Naval Operations, Admiral Stanley R. Arthur, ruled that there was no evidence of harassment and upheld the dismissal of Hansen from the flight program. Independent inquiries by the Navy and DoD inspector general offices confirmed Arthur's decision. Hansen's home state Senator, David Durenberger, however, demanded that Arthur's name be withdrawn from future command nominations, and Boorda, now CNO, acquiesced on June 24, 1994. The next day, Senator Daniel Inouye criticized the Navy for the decision, saying, "Have we come to this-where facts no longer matter, where appearances and imagery rule, where symbolism and symbolic value drive out realism and truth? We were appalled by the Navy's Tailhook scandal. But we have to stop this cycle of character assassinations by insinuation."

In the wake of Tailhook, sexual harassment and assault complaints filed by female servicemembers greatly increased. The increase was attributed, in part, to military women feeling more confident and empowered to report actual abuses, believing that their reports would be taken seriously and they would not face retaliation. Male servicemen, however, claimed that many of the complaints were false and/or exaggerated, filed because the women involved did not fear punishment for making a false report, or believed that their report would be found credible no matter how specious, because of the political climate. As a result, it was reported that male servicemen began to avoid their female counterparts, and otherwise took precautionary measures when interacting with them, such as ensuring that there was always a witness to their conversations.

Since the 1990s, the U.S. military has periodically been involved in sexual harassment or sexual assault controversies that receive widespread media attention and recriminations. In media reports on the incidents, the Tailhook scandal is usually mentioned.

=== Criticisms ===
Critics of the DoD's handling of the scandal expressed dissatisfaction that no one was found guilty or disciplined for the most serious charges involved in the incident, which were the sexual assaults. Also, few of the senior Navy and Marine leaders, such as Kelso (who, as testimony and other evidence showed, were aware of the behavior at the Tailhook conventions and had done little or nothing to stop it) were disciplined or prosecuted.

Military members, as well as outside observers, accused the Navy of employing a double standard regarding several of the Tailhook-related issues. In addition to focusing the prosecutions on junior, rather than senior officers, none of the three women officers who were found in the investigation to have engaged in conduct unbecoming or lying to investigators were prosecuted or given nonjudicial punishment. Also, Navy members pointed out that up until the time of Tailhook, Navy leaders had allowed strippers and other salacious or sexualized entertainment to occur at officers' and enlisted clubs on bases, and this continued after Tailhook.

== See also ==
- 1919 Newport sex scandal
- 1996 Aberdeen scandal
- 2003 U.S. Air Force sexual assault scandal
- 2012 U.S. Air Force sexual assault scandal
- 2017 United States Armed Forces nude photo scandal
- Fat Leonard scandal
- Kelly Flinn
- The Invisible War (2012 film)
- Sexual assault in the United States military
