= Hooktail =

Hooktail or hook tail or variant, may refer to:

- Hooktail (character), a fictional character from the videogame Paper Mario: The Thousand-Year Door
- Hooktail Castle, a fictional location from the videogame Paper Mario: The Thousand-Year Door
- hook tail (accent), a diacritic mark; a variant of the hook (diacritic)
- Paragomphus (insect), a genus of dragonfly commonly called hooktails
- Dipturus oregoni (fish), a species of skate commonly called the hooktail
- hooktail (medical device), a U-shaped catheter invented by Melvin Judkins

== See also ==
- Q with hook tail, an extended Latin alphabet character
- Tail hook (disambiguation)
- Tail (disambiguation)
- Hook (disambiguation)
