= Frank Kelso =

American admiral (1933–2013)

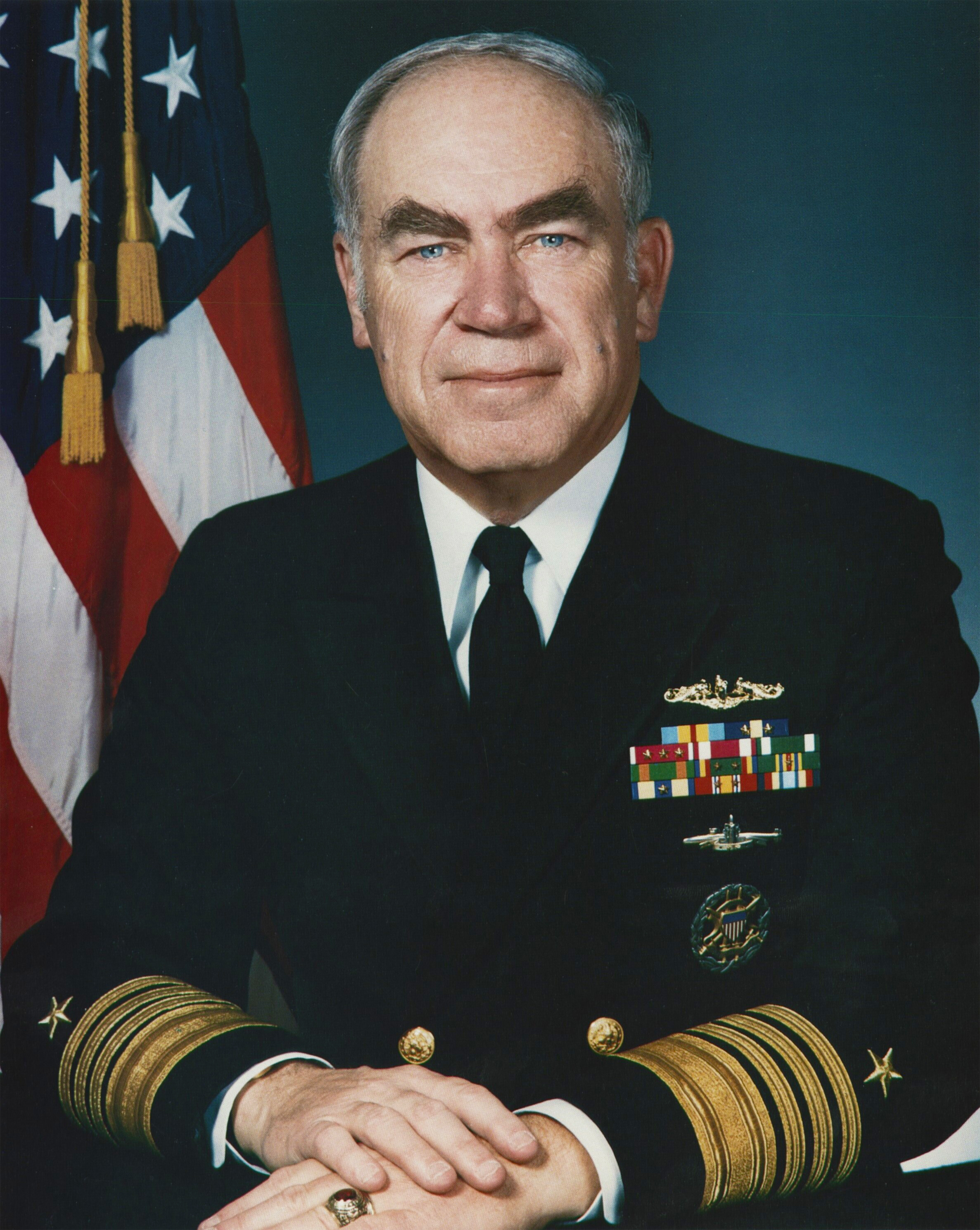
- Kelso in 1994
- Born: July 11, 1933; Fayetteville, Tennessee, U.S.
- Died: June 23, 2013 (aged 79); Norfolk, Virginia, U.S.
- Burial place: Rose Hill Cemetery, Fayetteville, Tennessee
- Spouse(s): Landess McCown Kelso (−2012; her death); Georgia Robinson (2013; his death)
- Military career
- Allegiance: United States
- Branch: United States Navy
- Service years: 1956–1994
- Rank: Admiral
- Commands: Chief of Naval Operations; Supreme Allied Commander Atlantic; United States Atlantic Command; United States Atlantic Fleet; Sixth Fleet; NATO Naval Striking Force and Support Forces Southern Europe; Submarine Squadron 7 USS Bluefish; USS Finback; Naval Nuclear Power School
- Awards: Defense Distinguished Service Medal (2); Navy Distinguished Service Medal (4); Army Distinguished Service Medal; Air Force Distinguished Service Medal; Coast Guard Distinguished Service Medal; Legion of Merit (4)

Frank Benton Kelso II (July 11, 1933 – June 23, 2013) was an admiral of the United States Navy, who served as Chief of Naval Operations from 1990 to 1994.

== Early life ==
Kelso was born in Fayetteville, Tennessee, on July 11, 1933. He attended public school and the University of the South in Sewanee, Tennessee, prior to entering the United States Naval Academy in 1952.

== Military career ==
Following graduation in 1956, Kelso served on the cargo ship USS Oglethorpe before attending Submarine School in 1958.

On completion of training, Kelso was assigned to the submarine USS Sabalo before returning to Submarine School for nuclear power training in January 1960. He then served one year in the Nuclear Power Department at the school. Subsequent tours included the pre-commissioning crew of USS Pollack, Engineering Officer aboard USS Daniel Webster and Executive Officer of USS Sculpin.

From January 1969 to August 1971, Kelso served as Commanding Officer, Naval Nuclear Power School in United States Naval Training Center Bainbridge, Port Deposit, Maryland. Following tours included Commanding Officer, USS Finback; Staff of Commander, Submarine Force, United States Atlantic Fleet; and Commanding Officer, USS Bluefish. Kelso was then assigned as Executive Assistant to the Commander in Chief, United States Atlantic Command and Atlantic Fleet and Supreme Allied Commander Atlantic from September 1975 to July 1977.

Kelso served as Commander, Submarine Squadron 7 until reporting as Division Director, Submarine Distribution Division in the Naval Military Personnel Command, and Section Head of the Submarine Programs Section in the Office of the Deputy Chief of Naval Operations (Manpower, Personnel and Training) in September 1978. He was selected for promotion to the rank of rear admiral in February 1980.

Upon selection for flag rank, Kelso served as Director, Strategic Submarine Division, Office of the Chief of Naval Operations, and then was assigned as Director, Office of Program Appraisal, Office of the Secretary of the Navy. On February 8, 1985, Kelso became Commander Sixth Fleet and NATO Commander Naval Striking Force and Support Forces Southern Europe. During this tour, forces under his command launched raids on Libya in defiance of Colonel/President Muammar Gaddafi's claim that Libya's territorial waters extended 200 miles into the Gulf of Sidra. On June 30, 1986, Kelso was promoted to admiral and assumed the duties of Commander in Chief, United States Atlantic Fleet. Kelso became Supreme Allied Commander Atlantic and Commander in Chief, United States Atlantic Command on November 22, 1988. In that capacity his forces were involved in the second Gulf of Sidra incident (1989). He succeeded Admiral Carlisle A.H. Trost to become the Navy's 24th Chief of Naval Operations (CNO) on June 29, 1990.

== Tailhook controversy ==
Kelso attended the 1991 Tailhook Association meeting in Las Vegas (his second time) at the urging of his senior aviation advisors to gain first-hand information from aviators who were part of Operation Desert Storm following Iraq's invasion of Kuwait. In the months following this meeting, allegations of sexual harassment of hotel guests and other sexual misconduct on the part of naval aviators surfaced. Following several lengthy investigations, more than 100 aviators were implicated in overt acts of sexual misconduct. None were court-martialed, though over half of those implicated were informally disciplined and the careers of several senior officers were essentially ended. Secretary of the Navy Lawrence Garrett ultimately resigned and Kelso was forced to retire two months early amid the scandal and aviator complaints that he had failed to ensure due process for accused personnel. Nonetheless, the Navy and its leadership were roundly criticized for minor punishments handed out to a few officers. Kelso was succeeded as CNO by Admiral Jeremy M. Boorda on April 23, 1994.

== Retirement and personal life ==
Shortly before his retirement, Senator Barbara Boxer attempted to punish Kelso by recommending a reduction in rank from full admiral to rear admiral (upper half). All officer assignments of 2-star officers (O-8) and below is under the authority of the Service Secretary. However, all military assignments for flag/general officers to 3-star or 4-star rank are job specific and the approval to hold that position with its associated rank is approved by the Senate. These assignments to jobs above 2-stars are usually limited to 18–24 months unless re-nominated. This includes retirement with 3–star or 4-star rank, any retirement with a rank higher than 2-stars must be requested by the Service Secretary to the Senate. An example of this was the case of Pacific Fleet commander Husband Kimmel following the Pearl Harbor attack, who was reassigned to a position/job of 2-stars, thus losing his “temporary” assignment with 4-star status; another case was Richard Dunleavy, Kelso's Assistant Chief of Naval Operations for Air Warfare, who was reassigned from his 3-star job to a 2-star job as a result of Tailhook. Boxer claimed Kelso was deserving of punishment on the grounds that as the Navy's top officer he bore ultimate responsibility for what happened at Tailhook. Boxer's attempt failed when more Senators agreed Kelso had taken the correct and proper actions in handling the affair, and he was allowed to retire at full rank. Kelso's supporters praised his overhaul of officer training that eliminated the separate Aviation Officer Candidate School at NAS Pensacola, Florida for non-United States Naval Academy and non-Naval Reserve Officers Training Corps college graduates that had traditionally set many naval aviators and naval flight officers apart from their other officer peers, and for tough new policies on sexual harassment. Had Kelso been demoted, it would have been a significant loss in his military pension.

Kelso retired with his wife, Landess McCown Kelso (who died in 2012), to his place of birth in Fayetteville, Tennessee in 2003. He died from complications of a fall and severe head injury on June 23, 2013, in Norfolk, Virginia, where he had gone to attend his grandson's graduation. He had been married to his second wife, Georgia Robinson, for just two weeks. He was also survived by two sons (both of whom served in the Navy) and two daughters.

== Military awards ==
Kelso's decorations and awards include:

Officer Submarine Warfare insignia
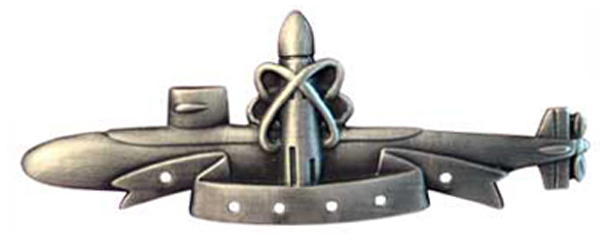
Silver SSBN Deterrent Patrol insignia with three gold stars
Office of the Joint Chiefs of Staff Identification Badge

Officer Submarine Warfare insignia
1st Row	Defense Distinguished Service Medal with one bronze oak leaf cluster		Navy Distinguished Service Medal with three 5/16" gold stars
2nd Row	Army Distinguished Service Medal	Air Force Distinguished Service Medal	Coast Guard Distinguished Service Medal
3rd Row	Legion of Merit with three 5/16" gold stars	Meritorious Service Medal with one 5/16" gold star	Navy and Marine Corps Commendation Medal
4th Row	Navy and Marine Corps Achievement Medal	Navy Unit Commendation w/ 2 bronze service stars	Navy Meritorious Unit Commendation w/ 1 service star
5th Row	Navy Expeditionary Medal w/ 1 service star	National Defense Service Medal with two 3/16" service stars	Navy Sea Service Deployment Ribbon

Military offices
Preceded by Carlisle A.H. Trost	Chief of Naval Operations; 1990–1994	Succeeded by Jeremy M. Boorda
Government offices
Preceded by Sean O'Keefe	United States Secretary of the Navy (acting); January 2 – July 21, 1993	Succeeded by John H. Dalton
