= Paula Coughlin =

US Navy officer

- Born: 1962 (age 63–64)
- Other name: Paula:Puopolo
- Occupations: Naval officer, pilot Yoga instructor

Paula Coughlin is a former lieutenant and naval aviator in the United States Navy. She is a victim who played a role in opening investigations into what was known as the Tailhook scandal.

== Early life ==
Coughlin attended Old Dominion University, where she joined the Reserve Officer Training Corps. She joined the Navy in 1984 and became a helicopter pilot.

== Tailhook scandal ==
She attended the Tailhook conference in September 1991, organized by former navy aviators at the Las Vegas Hilton (now the Westgate Las Vegas). Many of the attendees got raucously drunk. Coughlin was one of the first female attendees who reported being indecently assaulted by male attendees. Coughlin testified she feared being gang-raped when she was forced to "run the gauntlet". She had reported the incident to senior officers, but after a lack of progress due to "closing ranks and obfuscation," she went public in June 1992. The President, George H. W. Bush, met with Coughlin and expressed sympathy with her and promised a full investigation. Coughlin met with Secretary of Defense Dick Cheney—who told her he had just fired the Secretary of the Navy, implying the firing was her fault. She resigned from the Navy in February 1994, after being subject to abuse in retaliation for her allegations. She settled out of court with the Tailhook Association in October 1994, and was awarded $5.3 million in damages from the hotel after a jury concluded that the Las Vegas Hilton hotel had been negligent in not providing adequate security at the Tailhook convention.

A May 1995 made-for-television movie broadcast on ABC was based on Coughlin's story, She Stood Alone: The Tailhook Scandal (with Gail O'Grady as Coughlin), though she was not involved in making it.

== Later life ==
In 2012, Coughlin spoke for Protect Our Defenders, a nonprofit civil rights organization that supports victims of sexual assault in the United States military. She was featured in a Retro Report documentary called The Legacy of Tailhook and the Academy Award-nominated documentary on the subject, The Invisible War.

USA Today on December 5, 2017, in the midst of the 2017 Harvey Weinstein and Weinstein effect sexual abuse allegations, reported that women who reported past sexual harassment have suffered purgatory. The first instance in the article was Paula Coughlin who testified against Tailhook, and had not been able to find work in the private sector since. She now owns and operates a yoga studio in Atlantic Beach, Florida.
