= Tailing =

Tailing may refer to:

- Tailings, the material left over after the extraction of ore from its host material
- Lamb marking, a process applied in sheep husbandry, typically involving removal of a sheep's tail
- Tailgating, driving on a road too closely behind another vehicle
- Surveillance, following someone's movements
- Polyadenylation, adding a poly(-A) tail to a nucleic acid

== See also ==
- Tail (disambiguation)
