= Richard Dunleavy =

American admiral (1933–2025)

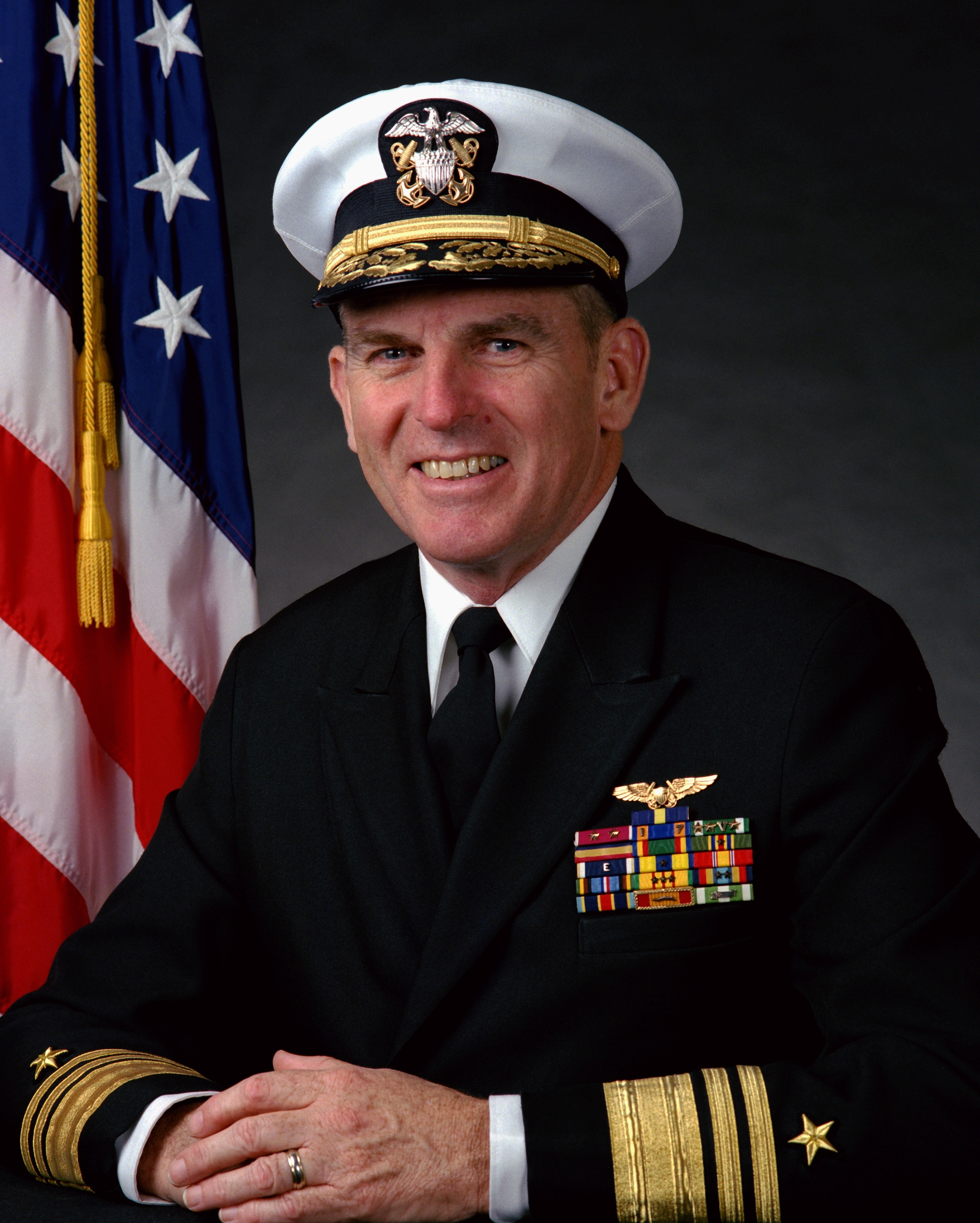
- Born: April 25, 1933; Boston, Massachusetts, U.S.
- Died: November 16, 2025 (aged 92); Virginia Beach, Virginia, U.S.
- Burial place: St. John the Apostle Catholic Church, Virginia Beach VA
- Military career
- Branch: United States Navy
- Service years: 1955–1992
- Rank: Vice Admiral (retired as Rear Admiral)
- Commands: VA-176; VA-128; USNS Ponchatoula; USS Coral Sea; U.S. Naval Forces, Philippines; Naval Air Forces Atlantic Fleet

Rear Admiral Richard Michael Dunleavy (April 25, 1933 – November 16, 2025) was an American naval officer. He retired as a two-star rear admiral in 1992 after being demoted from the rank of three-star vice admiral as a result of the Tailhook scandal.

== Early life and education ==
Dunleavy was born on April 25, 1933, in Boston, where he was also raised. He attended Boston College, and graduated in 1955.

== US Navy training and initial postings ==
Dunleavy was one of the last Aviation Officer Candidates to attend Officer Candidate School at Naval Station Newport, Rhode Island. This was followed by AGO (Aviation Ground Officer) school at NAS Jacksonville and HATU (Heavy Attack Training Unit) at Naval Air Station Sanford, Florida. He was then assigned to Heavy Attack Squadron 1 (VAH-1) at NAS Jacksonville, Florida.

Dunleavy's first Fleet assignment was as a bombardier/navigator in the A-3 Skywarrior at NAS Jacksonville, Florida, followed by later transition to the A-5 Vigilante at NAS Sanford, Florida. He then became a reconnaissance attack navigator in the RA-5C Vigilante and was redesignated a Naval Flight Officer (NFO) with the establishment of the NFO specialty in 1966. Selected for transition to the A-6 Intruder attack aircraft, he subsequently became a bombardier/navigator in that aircraft at NAS Oceana, Virginia, later commanding an Atlantic Fleet A-6 squadron based there, Attack Squadron 176 (VA-176). This was followed by command of the Pacific Fleet's A-6 fleet replacement squadron (FRS), Attack Squadron 128 (VA-128) at NAS Whidbey Island, Washington.

While his squadrons were deployed on the USS Forrestal (CV-59) and USS Saratoga (CV-60) in the late 1950s and early 1960s he served in the North Atlantic and Mediterranean Sea. He made an around the world cruise in 1964, as part of Operation Sea Orbit, while deployed on the USS Enterprise with Heavy Attack Squadron 7 (VAH-7).

== Combat experience ==
Dunleavy flew 69 combat missions while deployed to Southeast Asia during the Vietnam War, with Attack Squadron 85 (VA-85) - based at the time on the USS America (CV-66).

== Postings as commanding officer of Navy ships ==
Dunleavy commanded USS Ponchatoula and was later selected as the first naval flight officer to command an aircraft carrier, serving as commanding officer of USS Coral Sea (CV-43) (as a captain). While commanding the Coral Sea, he participated in the Iranian Hostage Crisis rescue attempt of April 1980 while patrolling in Gonzo Station, near Iran. Dunleavy was extremely well-liked and respected, and was considered an excellent commanding officer by those who served under him on the Coral Sea.

== Flag officer postings ==
As a flag officer, he served as commander, U.S. Naval Forces, Philippines; Commander, Naval Air Forces, Atlantic Fleet; and Deputy Chief of Naval Operations for Air Warfare (OP-05).

== Tailhook scandal ==
In 1991, Admiral Dunleavy was the highest-ranking officer at the annual Tailhook Association Symposium in Las Vegas, Nevada. After the convention was over, 83 women and 7 men stated that they had been victims of sexual assault and harassment during the meeting. As a result of the subsequent investigation Admiral Dunleavy took full responsibility for the incident.

He was one of three admirals given a censure for his part in planning the event. In October 1993, Secretary of Defense Les Aspin demoted Dunleavy (who had retired in July 1992) from three to two-star rank for his role in the Tailhook scandal.

It was determined that Admiral Dunleavy was the individual most responsible for the failures at Tailhook and that his performance of duties after Tailhook was similarly flawed. He had acknowledged that he encouraged "leg shaving," that he knew that strippers were performing and that he was aware of the activities during "the gauntlet", during which at least 26 women (naval officers and civilians) were systematically groped and sexually assaulted. However, he was not present at the gauntlet or any of the other sex-abuse incidents.

His letter of reprimand said that Admiral Dunleavy "condoned and did not act to terminate such conduct as the gauntlet, mooning and the presence of strippers in the [hotel] hospitality suites."

A March 2, 1992 Los Angeles Times article quoted Dunleavy as saying, "We in naval aviation leadership . . . failed . . . We weren't there to step in and stop it . . . I should be fired." The article goes on to state he felt the incident was "despicable" and prompted much "soul-searching."

Dunleavy retired from the Navy later that summer.

== Personal life ==
Dunleavy's son Mark served as a naval aviator and was selected to join the Blue Angels in 1996.

== Post-navy life and death ==
In the 2008 presidential election, he was among the 300 generals and admirals who enthusiastically endorsed John McCain for president.

Dunleavy died on November 16, 2025, at the age of 92.

== Awards and commendations ==
Dunleavy's decorations included a Distinguished Service Medal, three Legions of Merit, eight Air Medals (including one Individual Strike Medal), four Navy Commendation Medals with Combat "V", a Navy Unit Citation, a Navy and Marine Corps Achievement Medal, the National Defense Service Medal, and the Vietnam Campaign Medal.
