= Hospitality suite =

A hospitality suite is a room or suite of rooms in a hotel or convention center, provided during a convention or conference, in order for a business, candidate, or organization to meet and entertain current or potential clients, supporters, etc. providing free refreshments and a place for guests or visitors to rest and to mingle and network during the quiet times of an event such as between or after sessions.

At science fiction conventions, this is paid for by the convention, and is known as a consuite or con suite.

Some destination weddings include a hospitality suite, where wedding guests can come for refreshments and information.
