= USS Parrot =

Minesweeper of the United States Navy

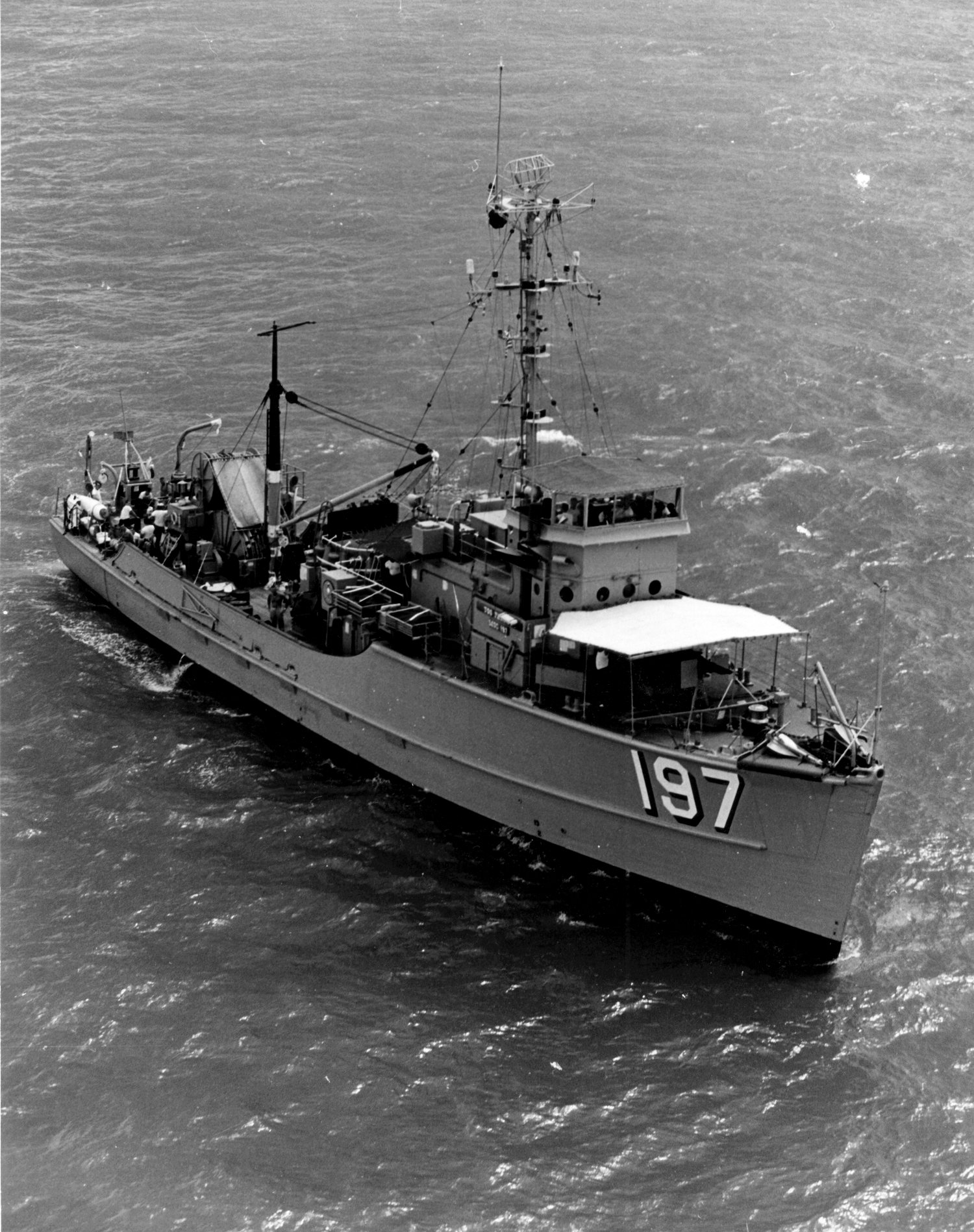
- USS Parrot (MSC-197)

History

United States
- Name: Parrot
- Namesake: Parrot
- Builder: Broward Marine, Inc., Fort Lauderdale, Florida
- Laid down: 23 December 1953
- Launched: 27 November 1954
- Commissioned: 28 June 1955
- Decommissioned: 26 September 1968
- In service: 26 September 1968
- Out of service: 20 July 1972
- Reclassified: Coastal Minesweeper, 7 February 1955
- Stricken: 1 August 1972
- Identification: Hull symbol: AMS-197; Hull symbol: MSC-197
- Fate: Sold for scrap, 1 December 1976

General characteristics
- Class & type: Bluebird-class minesweeper
- Displacement: 362 long tons (368 t)
- Length: 144 ft 3 in (43.97 m)
- Beam: 27 ft 2 in (8.28 m)
- Draft: 12 ft (3.7 m)
- Installed power: 4 × Packard 600 hp (450 kW) diesel engines; 2,400 hp (1,800 kW)
- Propulsion: 2 × screws
- Speed: 13.6 kn (25.2 km/h; 15.7 mph)
- Complement: 39
- Armament: 2 × twin 20 mm (0.8 in) Oerlikon cannons anti-aircraft (AA) mounts; 2 × caliber .50 in (12.7 mm) machine guns; 1 × 81 mm mortar

USS Parrot (AMS/MSC-197) was a Bluebird-class minesweeper in the United States Navy for clearing coastal minefields.

== Construction ==
Parrot was laid down 23 December 1953, as AMS–197, by Broward Marine, Inc., Fort Lauderdale, Florida; launched on 27 November 1954; sponsored by Mrs. S. Heuer; reclassified MSC–197 on 7 February 1955; and commissioned on 28 June 1955.

== North Atlantic operations ==
After fitting out and training, Parrot, along with four other minesweepers, participated in cold weather minesweeping exercises in the North Atlantic. Parrot then moved to Charleston, South Carolina, her base for exercises and training operations in the Caribbean and the Gulf Stream. She remained there until January 1958, when she sailed north to participate in her first NATO exercise. In February 1958, Parrot was dispatched to the waters off Savannah, Georgia, to participate in a search for a nuclear weapon jettisoned by a bomber. Upon completion, she returned to the Caribbean area where she remained into 1961, conducting training exercises and serving as training ship for the Mine Warfare School. In March 1961, she assisted in helping to evaluate the new helicopter method of minesweeping. After completion of this duty, she returned to her training and patrol duties.

On 22 October 1962, Parrot was ordered to get underway, with no destination being specified. She was later directed to assist in the Cuban Quarantine operation. After this duty, she returned to Charleston. Once again she resumed her training and patrolling duties. On 1 March 1963, she left Charleston with orders to search for the overdue SS Marine Sulphur Queen. Finding nothing, Parrot returned to port on 18 March. Resuming patrol duties and training exercises, Parrot also made annual deployments to the Caribbean until August 1968.

== Decommissioning and reassignment ==
Decommissioned and placed in service on 26 September 1968, Parrot became a Naval Reserve Training Ship at Atlantic City. Placed out of service on 20 July 1972, and struck from the Naval Vessel Register on 1 August 1972, Parrot was sold by Defense Reutilization and Marketing Service for scrapping on 1 December 1976.

== Notes ==
Citations

== Bibliography ==
Online resources

- "Parrot I (MSC-197)". Dictionary of American Naval Fighting Ships. Naval History and Heritage Command. 18 August 2015. This article incorporates text from this source, which is in the public domain.
- "USS Parrot (MSC-197)". NavSource.
