= John Howard Dalton =

American politician and investor (born 1941)

John Dalton
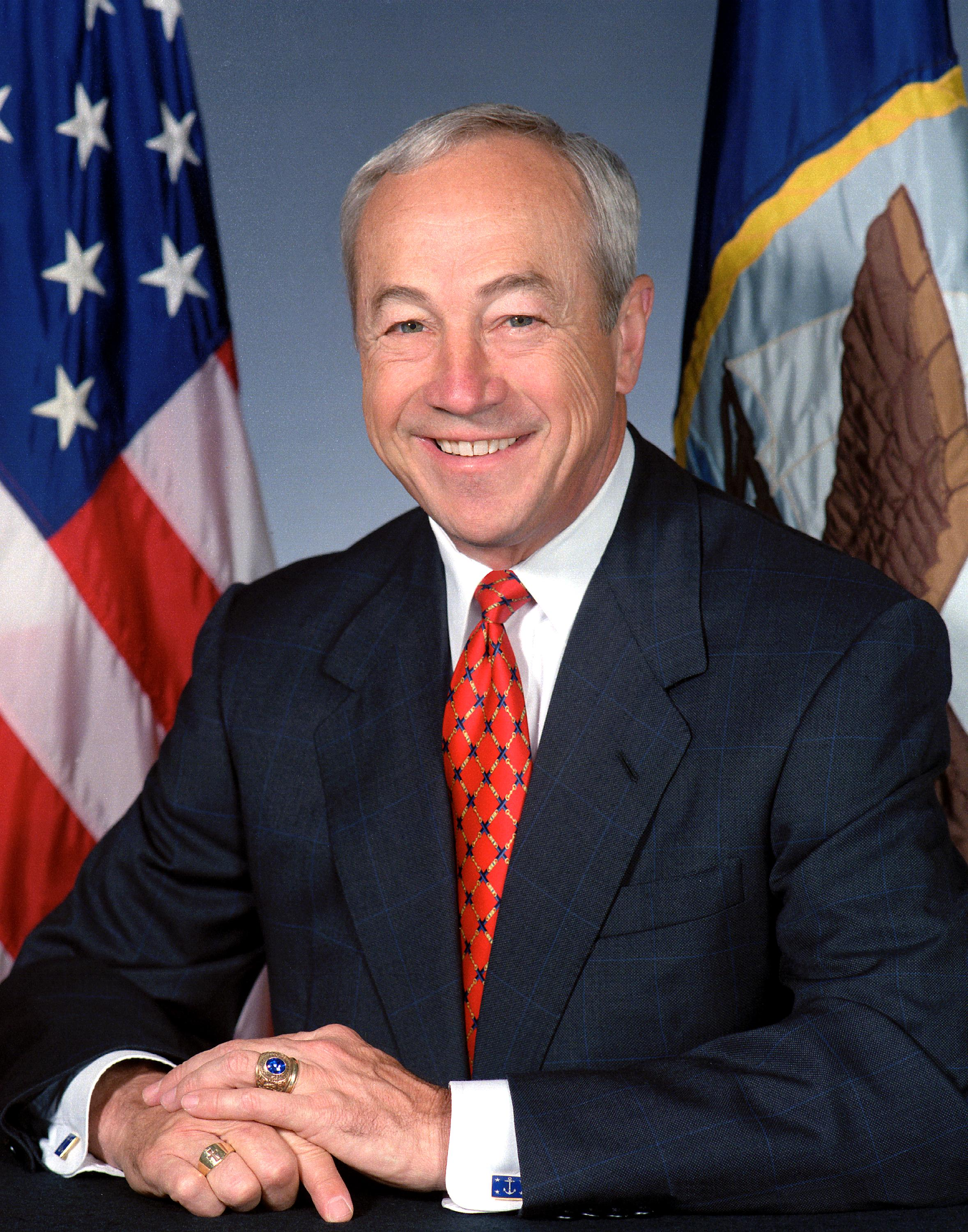

70th United States Secretary of the Navy
- In office July 22, 1993 – November 16, 1998
- President: Bill Clinton
- Preceded by: Frank Kelso (Acting)
- Succeeded by: Richard Danzig

Personal details
- Born: John Howard Dalton; December 13, 1941 (age 84) New Orleans, Louisiana, U.S.
- Education: Louisiana State University, Baton Rouge; United States Naval Academy (BS); University of Pennsylvania (MBA)

Military service
- Allegiance: United States
- Branch/service: United States Navy
- Years of service: 1964–1969
- Rank: Lieutenant commander

John Howard Dalton (born December 13, 1941) is an American politician and investor. Dalton was Secretary of the Navy from July 22, 1993, to November 16, 1998.

== Education and Navy service ==
Dalton attended Louisiana State University for a year before transferring to the U.S. Naval Academy in Annapolis. He graduated with distinction from Annapolis in 1964 and was a finalist in the Rhodes Scholarship competition. After graduating from Annapolis, Dalton served in the navy from 1964 to 1969. During that time he received naval nuclear power training and served aboard the submarines USS Blueback (SS-581) as the Supply and Commissary Officer and USS John C. Calhoun (SSBN-630) as the main propulsion assistant, communications officer and weapons officer. He attained the rank of lieutenant while on active duty and was promoted to lieutenant commander while in the U.S. Naval Reserve.

== Business career ==
After leaving the navy, Dalton ran the San Antonio, Texas, office of the Little Rock, Arkansas-based Stephens Inc. investment banking firm. Prior to his employment at Stephens Inc., he was managing director of Best Associates and Mason Best Company, merchant banking firms headquartered in Houston and Dallas respectively. In 1971, Dalton received a Master of Business Administration degree from the Wharton School of the University of Pennsylvania.

From 1984 to 1988, Dalton served as chairman and chief executive officer of Freedom Capital Corporation in San Antonio, and president of the Sequin Savings Association. Prior to this position, he was president of the Real Estate Division of the Gill Companies of San Antonio. President Carter nominated Dalton to the Federal Home Loan Bank Board in December 1979, where he served as a member and chairman until July 1981. Dalton was president of the Government National Mortgage Association of the U.S. Department of Housing and Urban Development before being appointed to the bank board. He began his public service career after serving with the investment banking firm of Goldman, Sachs & Company in Dallas, Texas.

Since January 2005, Dalton has been president of the Housing Policy Council at The Financial Services Roundtable.

== Notes ==
Government offices
Preceded by Adm. Frank B. Kelso II (act.)	United States Secretary of the Navy; 1993–1998	Succeeded by Richard Danzig
