= Tail (disambiguation) =

A tail is the section at the rear end of an animal's body, a distinct, flexible appendage to the torso.

Tail or tails may also refer to:

== Science and technology ==
- Tail (books), a part of a book
- Tails (operating system) or The Amnesic Incognito Live System, a Linux distribution designed for anonymity and privacy
- Tail (Unix), a Unix program used to display the last few lines of a file
- Tail, one of the extreme ends of a probability density function
- Terminal amine isotopic labeling of substrates
- Poly-A tail, part of a mature mRNA

== Entertainment ==
- Tails (album), an album by Lisa Loeb
- Tails (Sonic the Hedgehog), a character in the Sonic the Hedgehog franchise
- Tail, a character in the Kaiketsu Zorori movie

== Other uses ==
- Tails, the reverse side of a coin
- Tailcoat or its rear section, a type of coat/suit used for evening dress
- Tail, the final batsmen in the batting order for cricket
- Fee tail or tail, an obsolescent term in common law
- Jabot (window), a kind of soft window treatment

== See also ==
- Aircraft tail, the empennage of an aircraft
- Comet tail, a visible part of a comet
- Rattail (hairstyle), a hairstyle
- Tail recursion, a type of recursion in computer programming
- Tail rotor, a small vertical propeller mounted at the rear of a helicopter
- Tailing (disambiguation)
