= Sexual Assault Prevention Response (US military) =

US military training program

Sexual Assault Prevention and Response (SAPR) is a US military training program designated to educate service members and to provide support and treatment for their families who have experienced any form of sexual assault. The SAPR program provides treatment and support including, medical, counseling, and direct guidance in navigating through the Uniform Code of Military Justice (UCMJ). This program runs in accordance with United States Department of Defense Instruction 6495.02 – SAPR program procedures. Generally anyone who is entitled to receive care at a military treatment facility is also eligible to receive care and support through SAPR. Each branch of the military (DoD, Army, Marine Corps, Navy, Air Force, Coast Guard, National Guard) has adapted the SAPR program and each branch has a SAPR point of contact.

"Multiple studies in the past decade have shown that command climate has an enormous bearing on likelihood of assault". In the Department of Defense, the "prevention portion has lagged".

== History ==
In February 2004, the former Under Secretary of Defense for Personnel and Readiness, Dr. Davis S.C. Chu was appointed to review the United States Department of Defense process for treatment and support for victims of sexual assault in the military. The Care for Victims of Sexual Assault Task Force was swiftly amassed. The task force reported back within 90 days with recommendations in April 2004. One of the recommendations led to the formation of the Joint Task Force for Sexual Assault Prevention and Response in October 2004. The task force developed a new DoD wide sexual assault policy and the policy was officially in place January 1, 2005. They then instructed more than 1,200 Sexual Assault Response Coordinators (SARCs), chaplains, lawyers, and law enforcement officials to train first responders. The military services trained more than 1,000,000 service members, enlisted and officers, and ingrained SAPR offices on all major base installations. The Sexual Assault Prevention and Response Office (SAPRO), is now the single authority for the sexual assault policy to assure each branch of service complies with DoD policy.

In February 2022 the Secretary of Defense instituted a management plan "to better understand current gaps [in Sexual Assault Prevention] and provide our teams with the necessary tools to enhance prevention capabilities". But "in some [DoD] sites unhealthy [command] climates [are] marked by unprofessionalism, bullying and harassment were tolerated, and help seeking was either not possible, or was perceived to be punished". The military departments will be required to submit their compliance plans with the Secretary of Defense by 3 June 2022, and will issue guidance to their departments by 3 October 2022.

== Program ==
The SAPR program provides treatment and support including, medical, counseling, and direct guidance in navigating through the Uniform Code of Military Justice (UCMJ). This program runs in accordance with DoD Instruction 6495.02 – SAPR program procedures. Generally anyone who is entitled to receive care at a military treatment facility is also eligible to receive care and support through SAPR.

Each branch of the US military has adapted the SAPR program and each branch has a SAPR point of contact.

- Army SAPR
- Marine Corps SAPR
- Navy SAPR
- Air Force SAPR
- Coast Guard SAPR
- National Guard SAPR
- DoD SAPRO

== SAPR Advocate ==
All individuals are assigned to a SAPR Advocate; to assist them with the different treatment options that are available to them and to educate them about their rights. Services include: developing a safety plan, assessing the victim's medical needs and referrals to the appropriate health care provider. They also provide information on resources (civilian and military) that are available to them, information on the sexual assault forensic examination, and information on the military disciplinary system. A SAPR advocate is available 24 hours a day 7 days a week either through personal contact or through the DoD SAPR hotline. Typically each installation has a phone number to contact a SAPR advocate.

== Options for reporting a sexual assault ==
An Unrestricted report is for victims who want to pursue an official investigation about the incident. Victims can report it to law enforcement, a health care provider, a Chaplain, their chain of command, a SARC, or a SAPR Advocate.

A Restricted report can be reported to a SARC, victim advocate, health care provider, and in same cases, a military Chaplain, all of which contain a confidentiality clause. Victims will still be able to receive medical treatment and support but the incident will not be reported to law enforcement or to the service member's chain of command. Typically the victim is referred to a SAPR Advocate so that they may assist the victim in the options they have and to help them seek the care and support they need.

== See also ==
- In Their Boots
- Intimate partner violence and U.S. military populations
- Military sexual trauma
- Sexual assault in the United States military
- Sexual violence
- The Invisible War
- Women in the military
