= Military Sexual Trauma Movement =

American sexual assault prevention organization

- Abbreviation: MSTM
- Founder: Janelle Marina Mendez
- Purpose: Protecting service members who have experienced military sexual trauma, advocating for legislative and social reforms
- Headquarters: Hudson Valley, New York
- Region served: United States
- Board of directors: Janelle Marina Mendez Kelsey Harbor
- Key people: Kristen Ortega
- Website: https://www.mstmovement.org

The Military Sexual Trauma Movement (MSTM) is a nonprofit organization founded by Janelle Marina Mendez Viera in 2018 with the aim of protecting members of the United States Armed Forces from military sexual trauma (MST) and advocating for survivors of trauma. The Military Sexual Trauma Movement seeks legislative and institutional reforms that would prevent sexual violence and harassment in the military, and create greater accountability for harassment within the military.

== History ==
The Military Sexual Trauma Movement was founded in 2018 by Janelle Marina Mendez, a veteran of the United States Marine Corps, as a grassroots platform to combat the issue of sexual violence assault in the United States military. Mendez currently serves as the CEO and chairwoman of the board of directors for MSTM, which is headquartered in Hudson Valley, New York. Mendez had previously started a support group on Facebook for male and female survivors of military sexual trauma in 2018. The Facebook group was attacked by users from the closed Facebook group Marines United, which had been at the center of the United States Armed Forces nude photo scandal after it was revealed that Marines United was engaging in widespread revenge porn and sexual harassment.

The Military Sexual Trauma Movement has worked nationally to raise awareness and advocate for new legal reforms which would offer greater protections to members of the Armed Forces, including testifying before Congress. Among the reforms sought by the MSTM are the extension of state benefits to veterans who experienced MST and were dishonorably discharged, and the legalization of medical cannabis use for veterans who suffer from post-traumatic stress disorder (PTSD). The MSTM allows service members to report violence, harassment and disparaging behavior online.

The Military Sexual Trauma Movement gathers evidence of sexual abuse and harassment, and reports incidents to the press and to military authorities. On July 6, 2019, the Military Sexual Trauma Movement alerted the United States Marine Corps to a Facebook post in which Chief Warrant Officer 2 Kevin Ennett urged people to kill themselves if they objected to the presence of tanks at Donald Trump's controversial Salute to America event in Washington, D.C. Ennett was subsequently disciplined for the post by his chain of command, and made an apology on Twitter.

The Military Sexual Trauma Movement advocated for the No Bad Paper bill which would extend state benefits to veterans in New York who were denied an honorable discharge because of discriminatory discharge policies. The bill, authored by New York State Assemblywoman Didi Barrett, was signed into law as the Restoration of Honor Act by Governor Andrew Cuomo in 2019, and restored benefits eligibility to veterans who were dishonorably discharged due to their LGBTQ identity, or their having experienced military sexual trauma, traumatic brain injury (TBI), or PTSD. The bill "makes New York the first state in the nation to restore the benefits of veterans who received less than honorable discharges either because of these traumas or because of their LGBTQ identity". Mendez gave a speech on military sexual trauma at the 2019 Women's March in Hudson, New York.

== 2019 sit-in on Capitol Hill ==
In September 2019, the Military Sexual Trauma Movement hosted an event called "MSTM Takes on Washington D.C.". During the event, MSTM did a sit-in at Arizona Senator Martha McSally's office in Washington. D.C. Pamela Heal, MSTM's Executive Director for Civic Engagement, also attended the event. While in Washington, D.C., MSTM also engaged in demonstrations at the Russell Rotunda, the Capitol building, and the U.S. Marine Corps Commandant's house.

Several volunteers who had accompanied MSTM to the event later sued the organization, claiming that photos of the event used on MSTM's website were their copyright. The claim was disputed by MSTM, who claimed to have purchased ownership of the photos.
