= United States Air Force Basic Training scandal =

Sexual assault scandal in the US Air Force

The United States Air Force Basic Training scandal is the military sex scandal which took place at Lackland Air Force Base in San Antonio, Texas. The scandal involved 43 female trainees allegedly victimized by their instructors during and after basic military training beginning in 2009. Seventeen male instructors were accused of offenses ranging from the solicitation of improper relationships to rape, and 35 instructors were removed from their posts pending an investigation. Nine of the accused instructors belonged to the 331st Training Squadron, and squadron commander Lt. Col. Mike Paquette was removed from command in June 2012 because of the problems in his unit. In August 2012 Col. Glenn Palmer, commander of the 737th Training Group, was also relieved from his position due to the scandal.

== Events ==
Investigation of the scandal began in June 2011, when a trainee reported suspected sexual misconduct. In November 2011, three instructors reported possible misconduct after overhearing fellow Military Training Instructors (MTIs) discussing something "completely unacceptable".

In June 2012 Staff Sgt. Peter Vega-Maldonado made a plea deal, admitting an improper relationship and the violation of a no-contact order. Vega-Maldonado was sentenced to ninety days in jail, thirty days of hard labor, and his rank and pay were reduced. He agreed to testify against other accused MTIs in exchange for immunity from prosecution for other related crimes, and it was later learned that Vega-Maldonado had sex with nine other trainees.

The second case, which yielded the longest sentence (20 years), proceeded to court martial for Staff Sgt. Luis Walker of the 326th Training Squadron on 28 counts which included rape, aggravated sexual contact and aggravated sexual assault. Ten former trainees testified against Walker in his week-long trial, and he was accused of having sexual intercourse with four recruits. Walker was convicted on all 28 counts, sentenced to 20 years in jail and was required to register as a sex offender. In 2014 (two years after his conviction) Walker was found dead in his cell, an apparent suicide. He was married and had two children.

Tech. Sgt. Christopher Smith was charged with an improper relationship with one trainee, seeking an improper, personal and intimate relationship with another trainee and obstruction of justice. The charges stemmed from an incident in spring 2011 when Smith drove two trainees off the base to meet fellow instructor Master Sgt. Jamey Crawford. Smith was convicted and sentenced to 30 days' confinement and a reduction in rank to Airman First Class. Crawford was accused of an improper sexual relationship, providing alcohol to a trainee and adultery.

Staff Sgt. Kwinton Estacio was charged with sexual misconduct with a basic-training student, abusing his authority and obstructing justice. Although Estacio faced a maximum sentence of 43 years' confinement, he was sentenced to one year.

Staff Sgt. Craig LeBlanc was charged with sexual misconduct, obstructing justice and making a false official statement. He was accused of using his post as military instructor to sexually assault and pursue a sexual relationship with a female trainee, and having a wrongful sexual relationship with another. LeBlanc faced up to 22 years in prison, and was sentenced to two-and-a-half years.

== See also ==
- Sexual assault in the United States military
- 1991 Tailhook scandal
- 1996 Aberdeen scandal
- 2003 US Air Force sexual assault scandal
- The Invisible War (2012 film)
