= Aberdeen scandal =

1996 sexual assault scandal in the US Army

The Aberdeen scandal was a military sexual assault scandal in 1996 at Aberdeen Proving Ground, a United States Army base in Maryland.

Ultimately, twelve drill instructors were charged with sex crimes; four were sentenced to prison, while eight others were discharged or received non-judicial punishment. Additionally, "letters of reprimand were issued to Aberdeen's commanding general and three other senior officers."

== Charges brought against the officers ==
Captain Derrick Robertson and Sergeants Delmar Simpson and Nathanael Beech were accused of participating in the Army's biggest sex abuse scandal on record. Robertson and Simpson faced rape charges and Beech was charged with adultery.

Army Secretary Togo West accused those charged of abusing their power, and ordered all soldiers to undergo sexual harassment training so they could learn the Army's "zero tolerance" policy towards sexual harassment. The men accused felt that statements made by West and other officials within the Army were prejudging the case and would result in an unfair trial. Robertson's attorney, Jerome Murphy, asked the military judge Linda Webster, to enact a gag order on West and others, but she deferred judgment. However, she did order prospective jurors not to follow media coverage of the case to avoid interference with their judgment.

== Individuals involved and outcomes ==
- Sergeant Delmar Simpson was held at the Marine Corps Brig, Quantico while his court-martial was pending. He was convicted of 18 counts of rape and 29 other offenses, and was sentenced to 25 years in military prison.
- Staff Sergeant Vernell Robinson Jr., "was convicted of 19 counts involving the abuse of five women under his command," including sodomy, adultery, communicating a threat, obstructing justice and disobeying orders. At his court-martial, Robinson "made a dramatic plea for clemency, weeping and beating his head contritely against the witness stand." Robinson was sentenced to six months in prison, demoted to private, forfeited all benefits, and was dishonorably discharged from the military.
- Captain Derrick Robertson, a thirty-year old career soldier, was the highest-ranking of the defendants, serving as a company commander. He was charged with rape, forcible sodomy, adultery, indecent assault, conduct unbecoming an officer, violating a general order, and obstruction of justice. He pleaded guilty to adultery, consensual sodomy, conduct unbecoming an officer and dereliction of duty under a plea agreement with military prosecutors. His case involved one female soldier. Robertson was sentenced to one year in prison, with eight months suspended.
- Staff Sergeant Herman Gunter was charged "with rape, assault, adultery, indecent assault, sexual intercourse by fear, conspiracy to obstruct justice, obstruction of justice, violation of a general order, and cruelty and maltreatment for inappropriate sexual comments and harassment"; the allegations involved three female trainees. The Army subsequently dropped the two counts of sexual intercourse by fear. At court-martial, Gunter was acquitted of four of the remaining seven counts (of "indecent assault, adultery, cruelty and maltreatment, and engaging in a forbidden social relationship with one of the two women") but was convicted of inappropriate behavior (by trying to hug and kiss another woman) and of obstructing an investigation (by asking both women not to speak with investigators). Gunter was sentenced to a reprimand and to demotion by two grades.
- Sergeant 1st Class William Jones, a drill instructor assigned to B Company of the 16th Ordnance Battalion, was charged with one count of indecent assault involving an ex-trainee (a civilian at the time of the alleged offense), one count of drunkenness on duty, and "seven counts of fraternizing with recruits that involve six female trainees." The Army ultimately dropped the charges, choosing to pursue discharge proceedings instead.
- Sergeant 1st Class Theron Brown, an instructor, was "charged with violation of a general order, sodomy, adultery, making a false statement and disobeying a superior's order" in connection with incidents involving two female trainees and one female civilian. Brown was discharged from the service in lieu of court-martial.
- Sergeant Nathanael C. Beach, another drill instructor, was charged with "violation of a superior's order, failing to obey a general order, making a false official statement, adultery, communicating a threat and fraternization with a female soldier" for incidents involving two female soldiers. Beach was accused by a trainee "of having sex with her and threatening to kill her if she didn't keep quiet." Charges were dropped against Beach, who faced administrative discipline rather than court-martial.
- Sergeant Isiah Chestnut was initially charged with a variety of offenses, involving four female trainees, but the Army decided not to pursue a court-martial, choosing Article 15 non-judicial punishment instead. Chestnut was ultimately permitted to resign in lieu of facing court-martial.
- Sergeant 1st Class Ronald Moffett "was charged with indecent assault, indecent language, adultery, cruelty and maltreatment, and violating an order prohibiting social relationships with trainees" in a case involving four female soldiers. Moffett agreed to be discharged in lieu of court-martial.
- Sergeant Tony Cross, a Gulf War veteran who had been in the Army for fourteen years, was charged with "adultery, sodomy, wrongfully socializing with trainees and failing to report prohibited relationships" in a case involving four female trainees. Cross maintained his innocence and agreed to be discharged in lieu of court-martial.
- Major General John E. Longhouser, the commanding general of Aberdeen Proving Ground, was allowed to take early retirement in 1997 after it was revealed that he had "an adulterous affair with a civilian woman while separated from his wife." The events occurred more than five years before Longhouser's retirement, and before his arrival at Aberdeen. According to the New York Times, Pentagon officials stated that Longhouser "appeared to be retiring partly out of disgust that his entire career would be judged on the basis of what he and others would regard as a minor dalliance."

== Fort Leonard Wood scandal ==
A separate and unrelated scandal took place in 1996 at Fort Leonard Wood in Missouri; charges in that case were announced five days before the Aberdeen scandal became public, and the two cases were reported by the media in tandem. According to Army officials, 22 female soldiers "were involved in incidents" in which three men—Staff Sgt. Loren B. Taylor, Staff Sgt. Anthony S. Fore, and Sgt. George W. Blackley Jr.—were charged.

Taylor pleaded guilty to failing to obey a general regulation "by having consensual sex with three female recruits and trying to have sex with another" and admitted to "improper contact with a fifth woman recruit." Taylor was "discharged, demoted and sentenced to confinement."

Fore pleaded guilty to failing to obey a general regulation, indecent assault, and assault and battery, and a military judge, after hearing testimony, convicting Fore "of two additional counts of failing to obey a general regulation and indecent assault." The Army dropped several other charges. Fore was sentenced to eighteen months in prison and was dishonorably discharged.

Blackley was acquitted on charges of failing to obey a general regulation, indecent assault, maltreatment and showing disrespect to a fellow non-commissioned officer.

== Aftermath ==
Since the charges were filed, the U.S. Army set up a hotline to take reports of sexual harassment in the military. It has also made available many resources for soldiers who feel they have been harassed or assaulted.

Supervisors were also barred from having romantic relationships with the soldiers they trained. The Army cited the fact that they cannot be sure if all relationships are consensual due to the nature of a supervisor's power over their trainees.

== See also ==
- Sexual assault in the United States military
- 1991 Tailhook scandal
- 2003 United States Air Force Academy sexual assault scandal
- United States Air Force Basic Training scandal
- Death of LaVena Johnson
- Military sexual trauma
- The Invisible War (2012 film)
- War rape
- Effects and aftermath of rape
- Institutional betrayal
- Rape crisis centers in the United States
- Military sociology
- Women in the military
- Women in combat
- Women in warfare and the military (1945–1999)
- Women in warfare and the military (2000–present)
