= BNOC =

BNOC can refer to:

- Britoil, originally formed in 1975 as the British National Oil Corporation.
- British National Opera Company, (1921–9) first European opera company to broadcast a complete opera.
- Basic Noncommissioned Officer Course, previous name for the U.S. Army's Basic Leader Course
- Can refer to multi gaming world record holder BNOC SK
- Biggest Name on Campus
