= H.R. 2527 (113th Congress) =

United States proposed legislation

- Long title: To amend title 38, United States Code, to provide veterans with counseling and treatment for sexual trauma that occurred during inactive duty training.
- Announced in: the 113th United States Congress
- Sponsored by: Rep. Dina Titus (D, NV-1)
- Number of co-sponsors: 14

Codification
- U.S.C. sections affected: 38 U.S.C. § 1720D

Legislative history
- Introduced in the House as H.R. 2527 by Rep. Dina Titus (D, NV-1) on June 26, 2013; Committee consideration by United States House Committee on Veterans' Affairs, United States House Veterans' Affairs Subcommittee on Health

H.R. 2527 is a bill that would extend a United States Department of Veterans Affairs (VA) program of counseling and care and services for veterans for sexual trauma that occurred during active duty or active duty for training to veterans who experienced such trauma during inactive duty training. The bill would alter current law, which allows access to such counseling only to active duty members of the military, so that members of the Reserves and National Guard would be eligible.

The bill was introduced into the United States House of Representatives during the 113th United States Congress.

== Background ==
Military Sexual Trauma (MST) is a term used by the United States Department of Veterans Affairs (DVA) to refer to rape, sexual assault and sexual harassment that occurs during military service. While sexual assault within the military is monitored by the Department of Defense (DoD) Sexual Assault and Prevention Response Office (SAPRO), MST is more broadly defined and is monitored within the DVA by the Military Sexual Trauma Support Team. MST may include any sexual activity performed against one's will, either through physical force, threats of negative consequences, implied promotion, promises of favored treatment, or sex without consent due to intoxication etc. Other events that may be categorized as MST may include: unwanted sexual contact, threatening, offensive remarks and unwelcome sexual advances.

It is widely believed that the rates of sexual trauma are underreported in both the military and the Veterans Administration (VA), In 2007, the American Journal of Public Health (AJPH) reported rates of MST were approximately 22% among female veterans and 1.2% among male Veterans.

Military sexual trauma is a stronger predictor of posttraumatic stress disorder than serving in combat is.

== Provisions of the bill ==
This summary is based largely on the summary provided by the Congressional Research Service, a public domain source.

H.R. 2527 would extend a Department of Veterans Affairs (VA) program of counseling and care and services for veterans for sexual trauma that occurred during active duty or active duty for training to veterans who experienced such trauma during inactive duty training.

== Procedural history ==
H.R. 2527 was introduced into the United States House of Representatives on June 26, 2013, by Rep. Dina Titus (D, NV-1). It was referred to the United States House Committee on Veterans' Affairs and the United States House Veterans' Affairs Subcommittee on Health.

== Debate and discussion ==
The organization VetsFirst testified before Congress that it "strongly supports" H.R. 2527. According to VetsFirst, the legislation would expand mental health and well-being services to "a greater number of our brave men and women" so that they could have "timely access to quality VA health care" when they are dealing with a military sexual assault.

The organization Wounded Warrior Project (WWP) testified before Congress that they strongly supported the bill, but pointed out a number of additional related challenges and problems that needed to be solved to improve the treatment of MST related conditions in veterans. The WWP did a study of its alumni and found that "almost half of the respondents indicated accessing care through VA for MST related conditions was 'Very difficult'. And of those who did not seek VA care, 41% did not know they were eligible for such care." The WWP also testified that in addition to expanding access to MST care, the VA needed to improve care itself, because veterans report "inadequate screening, providers who were either insensitive or lacked needed expertise, and facilities ill-equipped to appropriately care for MST survivors."

The Servicewomen's Action Network (SWAN) fully supported the passage of the bill because it "only makes sense" that the VA close the "gap in protections to veterans who need counseling and treatment for sexual trauma that occurred during inactive duty training."

== See also ==
- List of bills in the 113th United States Congress
- List of counseling topics
- Military sexual trauma
- Sexual assault in the United States military
