= 2003 United States Air Force Academy sexual assault scandal =

The Air Force Academy sexual assault scandal in 2003 involved allegations of sexual assault at the United States Air Force Academy, as well as allegations that the alleged incidents had been ignored by the academy's leadership.

== Context ==
President Gerald R. Ford signed legislation 7 October 1975 permitting women to enter the military academies; the United States Air Force Academy began admitting female officer cadets for the first time on 28 June 1976. The first class with women graduated in May 1980, and were nicknamed "Ladies of '80".

Concerns with sexual assault, hazing of male cadets, and the disciplinary process during the 1990-2000 period were detailed in a 2010 book by a former cadet.

== Allegations ==
The scandal began with an anonymous e-mail on 2 January 2003 to the secretary of the Air Force, the chief of staff of the Air Force, Senator Wayne Allard, Senator Ben Nighthorse Campbell, other U.S. congressmen, and media representatives. The e-mail asserted there was a significant sexual assault problem at the United States Air Force Academy that had been ignored by the academy's leadership. The secretary immediately directed the general counsel of the U.S. Air Force (SAF/GC) to establish a high-level working group to review cadet complaints concerning the academy's program of deterrence and response to sexual assault. The Secretary also asked the working group to review allegations of sexual assault reported from January 1993 through December 2002. The Secretary subsequently directed the Air Force's inspector general to review individual U.S. Air Force Office of Special Investigations (AFOSI) cases and to investigate cadet complaints concerning the alleged mishandling of sexual assault cases. In due course these investigations were carried out and a report issued on 14 September 2004.

=== Findings ===
Twelve percent of the women who graduated from the Air Force Academy in 2003 reported that they were survivors of rape or attempted rape while at the academy. Of 659 women enrolled at the academy at the time, 70 percent of the 579 women at the academy alleged they had been the victims of sexual harassment, of which 22 percent said they experienced "pressure for sexual favors."

Nineteen percent of those surveyed claimed to have been the victims of sexual assault and more than seven percent said that assault took the form of rape or attempted rape. The alleged attackers had since graduated; there was insufficient evidence for court-martial. Sexual predation was mainly directed toward freshmen and sophomores who were under 21 and were blackmailed after accepting alcohol from upperclass cadets. Several assaults allegedly occurred while women were under the influence of alcohol.

This situation is thought to have been generally known among the leadership of the United States Air Force, but little has been done until recently to correct the situation or to discipline officers in leadership positions at the academy; those that have been disciplined have often been scapegoats, including a colonel who was forced into retirement despite having been assigned to the Air Force Academy for only two months, well after the rapes occurred. Lieutenant General John R. Dallager, the superintendent of the United States Air Force Academy, was demoted to major general due to the scandal.

In more recent years, however (beginning specifically in the spring semester of 2003), new leadership was instated at the academy, and began sweeping changes to the academy culture and environment in order to correct the problems. Specifically new sexual assault reporting procedures have been produced, alongside new mandatory reporting procedures, as part of an "Agenda for Change" program.

A confidential survey of 4,200 cadets and midshipmen, including all of the women and about 1,000 men, at US military academies conducted by the Defense Department in the spring of 2004 revealed 302 claims of sexual assault by women of which only one third had been officially reported. Taking this data into consideration, on 18 March 2005 a new policy was announced for all US military academies which would permit a victim of sexual assault to seek counseling and medical care confidentially without triggering the disciplinary process. This policy, it is hoped, will increase the percentage of sexual assaults which are reported and increase the willingness of victims to seek assistance. Military commanders would receive notice of the request for help but not the identity of the victim thus providing them with more accurate information. Hopes were expressed that the new policy, by giving more control over the situation to victims, would also result in more official reporting through disciplinary channels.

On 26 March 2005 it was reported in the combined weekend edition of the Rocky Mountain News and The Denver Post that acting Secretary of the Air Force, Peter B. Teets had recommended in a memo to Donald Rumsfeld, Defense Secretary that former commanders and other Air Force officers, now mostly retired, who were implicated in the sexual assault scandal by the inspection by the inspector general's office and the Fowler Commission not be prosecuted as they had "acted in good faith" and "were not intentionally or willfully derelict in their duties" as they attempted to deal with the sexual assault issue. Continuing, Teets wrote, "Moreover, any mistakes or misjudgments some of them may have made are mitigated by the complexity of the issues they faced, the necessity of policy trade-offs and compromises, and the difficulty of measuring program effectiveness... . The record of missed warning signs is disturbing, but these officers acted in good faith to discharge their responsibilities to act in the cadet's best interests by taking bold steps to deter sexual assaults and implement effective reporting procedures... . Given their uniform excellence and long service to the Air Force and their country, I have determined that taking the highly unusual step of imposing disciplinary action against these retired members under these circumstances is not warranted."

Teets's memo was forwarded to Congress over the Easter weekend, but despite the congressional recess was met with dismay by the office of Senator Wayne Allard, Republican Senator from Colorado and Representative Louise Slaughter, Democrat of New York who have led congressional inquiries into the scandal. Concern was also expressed by Kate Summers of the victims rights group Miles Foundation.

In late 2006, a military judge dismissed a rape charge against an accused cadet because the accuser's mental health professional refused a court order to release medical records of statements the accuser had made to her. On 10 January 2007, the Associated Press reported that civilian prosecutors declined to file charges in an alleged sexual assault that started the aforementioned 2003 sexual assault scandal because they could not meet the required burden of proof.

== See also ==
- Sexual assault in the United States military
- 1991 Tailhook scandal
- 1996 Aberdeen scandal
- 2012 US Air Force sexual assault scandal
- The Invisible War (2012 film)
- Rape in the United States of America
