= Sexual assault in the United States military =

Sexual violence and harassment

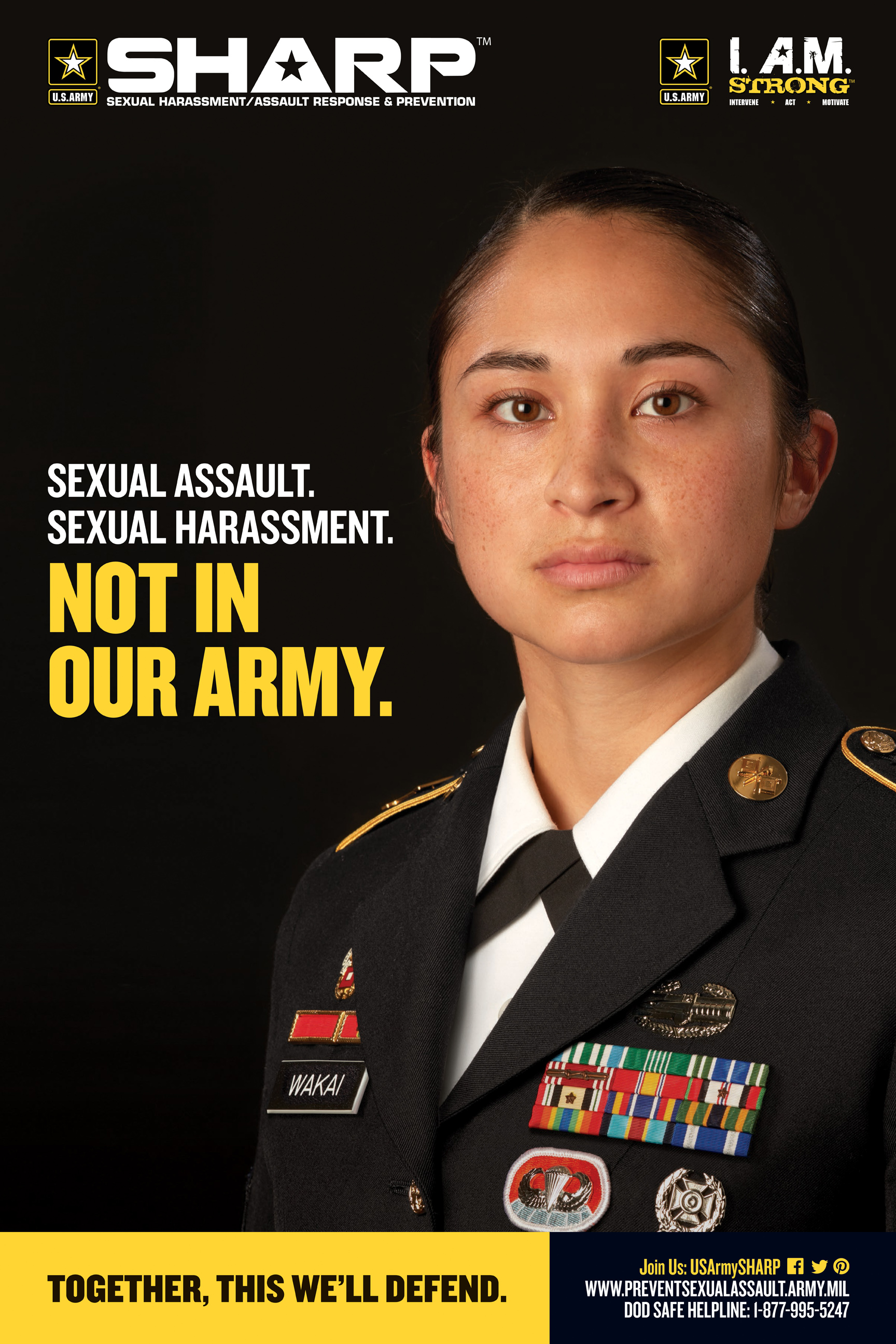
Poster created by Sexual Harassment/Assault Response & Prevention (SHARP) in the U.S. Army. Sexual harassment is a crime in the armed forces, by executive order on 26 January 2022.

Sexual assault in the United States armed forces is an ongoing issue which has received extensive media coverage in the past. A 2012 Pentagon survey found that approximately 26,000 members of service were sexually assaulted that year; of those, only 3,374 cases were reported. In 2013, a new Pentagon report found that 5,061 troops reported cases of assault. Of the reported cases, only 484 cases went to trial; 376 resulted in convictions. Another investigation found that one in five women in the United States Air Force who were sexually assaulted by service members reported it, for one in 15 men.

A survey for the Department of Defense conducted in 2015 found that in the past year 52% of active service members who reported sexual assault had experienced retaliation in the form of professional, social, and administrative actions or punishments. In addition to retaliation against soldiers remaining in active service, many former service members who reported sexual assaults were forced to leave after being discharged. Reasons for discharge included having a "personality disorder" or engaging in misconduct related to the sexual assault such as fraternization or (prior to the end of don't ask, don't tell) homosexuality, even if the homosexual conduct was non-consensual.

Incidents which have been publicized include the 1991 Tailhook scandal, the 1996 Aberdeen scandal, the 2003 U.S. Air Force Academy sexual assault scandal, and the 2009-12 United States Air Force Basic Training scandal. In an attempt to deal with this problem, the Department of Defense issued the Department of Defense Sexual Assault Response policy. A provision in the 2004 National Defense Authorization Act required investigation and reporting regarding sexual harassment and assault at the United States military academies. A report published in The New York Times in March 2007, which surveyed women soldiers' experience in the Iraq War, showed high rates of post traumatic stress syndrome resulting from the combination of combat stress and sexual assault. Of the female veterans from Iraq and Afghanistan who have visited a Veterans Affairs (VA) facility, 15% have screened positive for military sexual trauma.

Women veterans who have been subjected to both sexual and physical assault are more likely to have chronic health issues and significantly lower quality of life in terms of their health more than 10 years after completing active duty. In one study, women veterans detailed how traumatic experiences such as sexual assaults from peers and supervisors and the subsequent lack of support after these incidents contributed to their decision for premature separation from military service. Many of these women see these experiences as robbing them of promised opportunities when they enlisted, and feel betrayed when the military's handling of their sexual assault cases resulted in them having to continue to work with the perpetrator. Another article suggests that women in the military might have worse consequences of reporting Intimate Partner Violence (IPV) and find increased difficulty in prosecuting perpetrators due to the nature of military service. It has been proposed that military commanders who handle sexual assault cases be sensitized to the dynamics and impacts of IPV in order to lessen secondary victimization of women and provide a greater social support system for women who experience IPV in the military.

== Context ==
Sexual misconduct, including harassment and assault, is a pervasive problem in militaries worldwide. It affects women disproportionately, particularly younger women and girls. Other groups at high risk include partners of personnel, child cadets, and military detainees.

While prevalence varies by country, military branch, and other factors, official statistics from Canada, the UK, and the U.S. indicate that between a quarter and a third of military women in these countries are sexually harassed at work at least once each year. Military training settings are characterised by a particularly high level of sexual harassment and assault relative to both the civilian population and other military settings. Research further shows an increase in perpetration during and after deployment on military operations.

== Definition ==
Sexual assault is recognized as a crime in the United States military, and is generally defined as sexual contact or acts upon a person or persons who did not or could not (legitimately) consent to it. It may, but does not need to, involve the use of force, physical threat, or abuse of authority by the perpetrator(s), which often leads to the victim or victims of the crime fearing to seek justice. This fear is instilled by the same means in which the act was opposed on the person or persons. Sexual assault includes: rape, indecent assault, attempts to commit these acts, and witnessing these acts and not reporting them.

The U.S. Army Study Guide states:

Sexual assault is a crime defined as intentional sexual contact, characterized by use of force, physical threat or abuse of authority or when the victim does not or cannot consent. Sexual Assault includes: Rape; Non consensual Sodomy (oral or anal sex); Indecent Assault (unwanted, inappropriate sexual contact or fondling); and Attempts to commit these acts.

The 2005 Defense Task Force on Sexual Harassment and Violence at the Military Service Academies report states:

Within the military community, the term sexual assault carries a more far-reaching meaning that encompasses everything from violent sexual acts such as rape, forcible sodomy, and assault with intent to commit rape or sodomy, to indecent assault. While indecent assault connotes violence, violence is not a prerequisite of the crime. Indecent assault can be a mere sexual touching that occurs without the consent of the person who is touched.

The Uniform Code of Military Justice (UCMJ) § 920. Art. 120. "Rape and sexual assault generally" differentiates between rape (which requires an element of force or coercion) and sexual assault (which occurs any time a person commits a sexual act upon another person to which the latter did not or could not (legitimately) consent):

(a) Rape. —Any person subject to this chapter who commits a sexual act upon another person by—

(1) using unlawful force against that other person;
(2) using force causing or likely to cause death or grievous bodily harm to any person;
(3) threatening or placing that other person in fear that any person will be subjected to death, grievous bodily harm, or kidnapping;
(4) first rendering that other person unconscious; or
(5) administering to that other person by force or threat of force, or without the knowledge or consent of that person, a drug, intoxicant, or other similar substance and thereby substantially impairing the ability of that other person to appraise or control conduct;

is guilty of rape and shall be punished as a court-martial may direct.

(b) Sexual Assault. —Any person subject to this chapter who—

(1) commits a sexual act upon another person by—

(A) threatening or placing that other person in fear;
(B) making a fraudulent representation that the sexual act serves a professional purpose; or
(C) inducing a belief by any artifice, pretense, or concealment that the person is another person;

(2) commits a sexual act upon another person—

(A) without the consent of the other person; or
(B) when the person knows or reasonably should know that the other person is asleep, unconscious, or otherwise unaware that the sexual act is occurring; or

(3) commits a sexual act upon another person when the other person is incapable of consenting to the sexual act due to—

(A) impairment by any drug, intoxicant, or other similar substance, and that condition is known or reasonably should be known by the person; or
(B) a mental disease or defect, or physical disability, and that condition is known or reasonably should be known by the person;

is guilty of sexual assault and shall be punished as a court-martial may direct.

== Statistics ==
A 2011 report found that women in the U.S. military were more likely to be raped by fellow soldiers than they were to be killed in combat.

A substantial increase in reported sexual assaults occurred at the three U.S. military academies for the 2010–2011 school year. It is possible that the increase resulted only from increased willingness to report incidents; increased reporting has been one of the goals of the Department of Defense.

At a November 2011 press conference introducing legislation to combat sexual assault in the armed forces, Rep. Jackie Speier stated that of the 13% of military sexual assault victims who reported the crimes committed against them, 90% were involuntarily discharged.

In September 2013, Congress received the U.S. Commission on Civil Rights 2013 Statutory Enforcement Report. The report found that during the 2012 fiscal year, there were 3,374 reports of sexual assault upon military service members. Of these, 816 were not included in the commission report because they were confidential, restricted, and not investigated. The report indicated that commanders are increasingly likely to refer sexual assault cases to court martial compared to the prior four years. In 15% of cases, the accused perpetrator was permitted to resign or be discharged in lieu of court martial.

The same commission report included the results of an anonymous survey of military personnel in which 23% of women and 4% of men reported experiencing unwanted sexual contact since enlistment. Based on this survey, the Department of Defense estimated that 26,000 service members experienced some form of unwanted sexual contact, from groping to rape, in the year 2012. 34% of women and 24% of men who reported these events in the anonymous survey stated that they had reported the event to authorities.

According to a 2013 United States Commission on Civil Rights report, a 2010 survey conducted by the Department of Defense found that 54% of women and 27% of men did not report incidents because they feared retaliation; the survey also found that 47% of women and 20% of men did not report incidents because they had heard other victims had a negative experience after reporting.

In 2011, an alleged victim of sexual assault sued the sitting Secretary of Defense and the former Secretary of Defense in the United States District Court for the Eastern District of Virginia. She was seeking money damages on the theory that their department had failed to protect her from her assailant. The Court dismissed the claim on grounds that without congressional invitation, the courts have little authority to intervene in military affairs because under Article I, Section 8 of the Constitution, regulation of the military is the responsibility of Congress; Congress had not invited the courts to allow lawsuits against its armed forces, and so the lawsuit was dismissed. Those who were offended by the dismissal of the case criticized the court and claimed the decision had labeled sexual assault an "occupational hazard" in the armed forces. The decision of the court has no such language in it.

Sexual assaults in the U.S. military have risen sharply over the past two years, mostly due to a 50% increase in assaults on women in uniform, according to a Pentagon study released in May 2019. The Military Sexual Assault Division's annual report estimates that there were 20,500 "unwanted sexual contacts" with her in fiscal 2018, based on surveys of men and women in the Army, Navy, Air Force, and Marines. This is a 38% increase from the last survey in 2016.

In 2021, 8% of female military personnel experienced unwanted sexual contact. This was the highest percentage since the DoD began this data collection in 2004. Of an estimated 35,900 total sexual assaults, only 7,260 were reported. The reporting rate was 20%, which had fallen from 30% in 2018. Only 42% of cases resulted in court-martial proceedings. The confidence of female personnel in being treated "with dignity and respect" by their chain of command after reporting an assault was 39%, a decrease from 66% in 2018.

=== Sexual assault against men ===
The Pentagon estimated that 26,000 service members experienced unwanted sexual contact in 2012, rising from 19,000 in 2010. Of those cases, the Pentagon says, most involved attacks on men, predominantly by other men. Recent statistics show that in terms of number of assaults, "the majority of the victims are men." It also states that although rare, women have previously aided men in sexually assaulting other women. According to statistics released by the Department of Defense, in the 2012 fiscal year more men were victims of sexual abuse than women. Turchik and Wilson found that, "one problem that may be unique for men is confusion concerning sexual identity, masculinity, and sexual orientation after an assault, especially if the perpetrator is a man," and that "homosexual victims may…feel that the assault was a punishment for being gay, whereas heterosexual victims may feel confused about sexuality and masculinity, especially if their body sexually responded during the assault."

In 2021, 1.5% of male military personnel experienced unwanted sexual contact. This was the second highest percentage since the DoD began this data collection in 2004. The confidence of male personnel in being treated "with dignity and respect" by their chain of command after reporting an assault was 63%, a decrease from 82% in 2018.

Studies of male sexual assault victims have shown that they become more prone to emotional, physical, and social difficulties after being assaulted, which is comparable to women. This shows that "[r]egardless of the victim's gender…the consequences of sexual assault are both far reaching and acute."

== Sexual Assault Prevention and Response Office (SAPRO) ==
2015 U.S. Navy SAPRO video on the importance of sexual consent

In 2004, the Department of Defense created the Care for Victims of Sexual Assault Task Force, whose findings indicated the need for a more powerful and centralized organization to address the issue. This led to the formation of the Joint Task Force for Sexual Assault Prevention and Response, which eventually transitioned into the Sexual Assault Prevention and Response Office (SAPRO).

"The Sexual Assault Prevention and Response Office (SAPRO) now serves as the Department's single point of authority for sexual assault policy and provides oversight to ensure that each of the Service's programs complies with DoD policy. It quickly obtained approval of DoD Instruction 6495.02, Sexual Assault Prevention and Response Program Procedures, making permanent all elements of the Department's sexual assault policy. In addition, it conducted a training conference for all Sexual Assault Response Coordinators. SAPRO, under the leadership of Major General Jeffrey J. Snow, continues to lead the Department's effort to transform into action its commitment to sexual assault prevention and response. This undertaking enjoys the support of leaders at all levels, and it will create a climate of confidence and trust where everyone is afforded respect and dignity."

=== Mission of SAPRO ===
"The Department of Defense Sexual Assault Prevention and Response Office (SAPRO) serves as the single point of authority for program accountability and oversight, in order to enable military readiness and reduce -- with a goal to eliminate -- sexual assault from the military."

=== Research and Reports ===
SAPRO oversees many studies, of which reports that are specifically directed towards sexual assault are only a part. The CDC, DMDC, USCCR, and White House are some of the sources that SAPRO draws its research and reports from. SAPRO is also responsible for releasing the Task Force Report on Sexual Assault in the Military Services, the most recent of which was published in 2009. The Task Force is charged with examining the issue of sexual assault in the military and issuing recommendations for legislation and policy-making based upon their findings.

The task force's recommendations included expanding the reach and scope of SAPRO, increasing funding for sexual assault prevention and response programs, reducing variability in sexual assault prevention and response policies between the different branches of the armed forces, raising standards for Sexual Assault Response Coordinators (SARCs), and focusing sexual assault training more on prevention and quality than after-the-fact response. They also recommended improved victim advocacy – allowing for easier communication with victim advocates, better disclosure of victims' rights, and access to attorneys – along with the formation of a database to track sexual assault information.

U.S. Senator Martha McSally, an Arizona Republican, said during a Senate meeting on sexual assault in the military that she was raped by a superior officer in the U.S. Air Force. McSally was the first female combat pilot in the U.S. Air Force. She said that she never reported it because she didn't trust the system at the time, she also said that she blamed herself, was ashamed and confused. She said she thought she was strong but felt powerless.

== Lawsuits against the Department of Defense ==
In February 2011, 17 United States veterans filed Cioca v. Rumsfeld, a suit against the Pentagon and Defense Secretary Robert Gates and former secretary Donald Rumsfeld, alleging that they allowed a culture in the armed forces where rape was unevenly reported and punished. In several of the plaintiffs' cases, the victim had been forced to work with the accused rapist after reporting them for sexual assault. Unit commanders often have heavy influence over military rape cases, and fewer than one in five cases are prosecuted. The case was featured in an episode of The Passionate Eye and the documentary The Invisible War. The case was dismissed in December 2011, appealed in April 2012, and the appeal was dismissed in Fourth Circuit court in July 2013.

== Clemencies and arrests ==
In 2013, two male officers convicted by court martial of sexual assault were given clemency, which consisted of having their convictions set aside by respective three-star generals, Lieutenant Generals Craig Franklin of the Third Air Force and Susan Helms of the 14th Air Force, Air Force Space Command and Joint Functional Component Command for Space, U.S. Strategic Command. In a six-page memorandum, Franklin outlined each piece of evidence in the case which led him to conclude that there had not been proof beyond a reasonable doubt of the accused's guilt. Helms provided her rationale in a Memorandum For Record (MFR), posted on the Air Force FOIA Website In her six-page memo, she outlined why the prosecution had not proven its case for sexual assault beyond a reasonable doubt. Her memo includes, verbatim, the specific standard of evidence directed by the military judge at trial, and her lawyer agreed with her assessment of the case. However, as noted in her MFR, she did uphold Captain Herrera's conviction for the lesser sexual crime of Indecent Act, which resulted in his discharge from the Air Force.

There was further public attention in May 2013 with the arrest for sexual battery of an Air Force lieutenant colonel assigned to the Air Force's sexual assault prevention program. The lieutenant colonel was prosecuted by civilian authorities in Arlington, Virginia, and was unanimously acquitted by a civilian jury of sexual battery and the lesser offense of assault and battery. The issue of sexual assault in the military then received new attention from President Obama and Secretary of Defense Chuck Hagel, among others. Congressional concern over these events and the issue also brought Marine General Jim Amos, Air Force General Mark Welsh and the Secretary of the Air Force Michael Donley to testify on the subject.

Army general and chairman of the Joint Chiefs of Staff Martin Dempsey was quoted as saying, "We're losing the confidence of the women who serve that we can solve this problem.... That's a crisis." Secretary Hagel "ordered the retraining and recertification of U.S. military personnel whose job it is to work to prevent sexual assault and assist the victims". In Congress, the Military Justice Improvement Act was announced. The act "would mean that trained military prosecutors, not commanding officers, would decide whether sexual assault cases should go to trial, according to a group of at least 16 U.S. senators and members of the House of Representatives behind the legislation. It also would mean commanders cannot set aside the conviction of anyone who has been found guilty of sexual assault or downgrade a conviction to a lesser offense", according to Reuters. Senators Kirsten Gillibrand (D-NY) and Susan Collins (R-ME) were amongst the sponsoring congress members and Senator Al Franken (D-MN) and others reportedly joined as co-sponsors. Co-sponsor Representative Kyrsten Sinema (D-AZ-9), who once worked as a rape crisis counselor, said, "It is clear that something is not working."

Andrew Loya was a former Coast Guard officer who shot dead one of his female colleagues; he maintains that she made sexual advances which resulted in him getting transferred to another department.

== Related legislation ==
On June 26, 2013, U.S. Representative Dina Titus introduced into the United States House of Representatives the bill To amend title 38, United States Code, to provide veterans with counseling and treatment for sexual trauma that occurred during inactive duty training (H.R. 2527; 113th Congress). The bill would extend a VA program of counseling and care and services for veterans for military sexual trauma (MST) that occurred during active duty or active duty training to include veterans who experienced such trauma during inactive duty training. The bill would alter current law, which allows access to such counseling only to active duty members of the military, so that members of the Reserves and National Guard would be eligible. The Wounded Warrior Project strongly supported the bill, but pointed out a number of additional related challenges and problems that needed to be solved to improve the treatment of MST-related conditions in veterans. The WWP did a study of its alumni and found that "almost half of the respondents indicated accessing care through VA for MST related conditions was 'Very difficult'. And of those who did not seek VA care, 41% did not know they were eligible for such care." The WWP also testified that in addition to expanding access to MST care, the VA needed to improve care itself, because veterans report "inadequate screening, providers who were either insensitive or lacked needed expertise, and facilities ill-equipped to appropriately care for MST survivors."

On September 16, 2020, the I Am Vanessa Guillen Act (H.R. 8270, 116th Congress) was introduced to the United States House of Representatives by Representative Jackie Speier. This bill was named after Army Specialist Vanessa Guillen, who went missing in April 2020 after disclosing to her family that she was experiencing sexual harassment from a superior officer; her remains were found on June 30, 2020. The bill aims to create a safer system for service members to report sexual harassment anonymously and to shift the prosecution of sexual offenses to an office outside the military chain of command. It also would add sexual harassment as an official crime in the Uniform Code of Military Justice, where only rape and sexual assault are listed. This bill is awaiting a vote in the House Armed Services Committee and so far has 180 bipartisan cosponsors.

Legislation is underway in 2021, to separate the commander of an afflicted unit from the military prosecutor's role in cases alleging sexual assault.

== Coast Guard ==
In 2020 the Coast Guard produced a report summarizing the results of Operation Fouled Anchor, a five-year investigation of sexual assault and harassment at the Coast Guard Academy, which focused on incidents prior to 2006. The report was not released outside the Coast Guard, and the U.S. Congress only learned of the report in 2023. In 2024, U.S. Senate subcommittee hearings were held on the matter, and some Senators alleged that Coast Guard leadership engaged in a cover up.

== See also ==
=== General ===
- 1995 Okinawa rape incident
- Abu Ghraib torture and prisoner abuse
- Institutional betrayal
- Intimate partner violence and U.S. military populations
- Military sexual trauma
- Rape during the liberation of France
- Rape during the occupation of Germany
- Rape during the occupation of Japan
- Rape in the United States of America
- Sexual harassment in the military
- Sexual assault
- Sexual violence
- Women in the military

=== Individual incidents towards civilians ===
- 1945 Katsuyama killing incident
- John E. Day
- 1955 Yumiko-chan incident
- 1995 Okinawa rape incident
- 2002 Michael Brown incident
- 2006 Mahmudiyah killings

=== Other countries ===
- Sexual assault in the Canadian Forces
- Sexual misconduct in the British military
- Dedovshchina
