= Basic Leader Course =

US Army training course

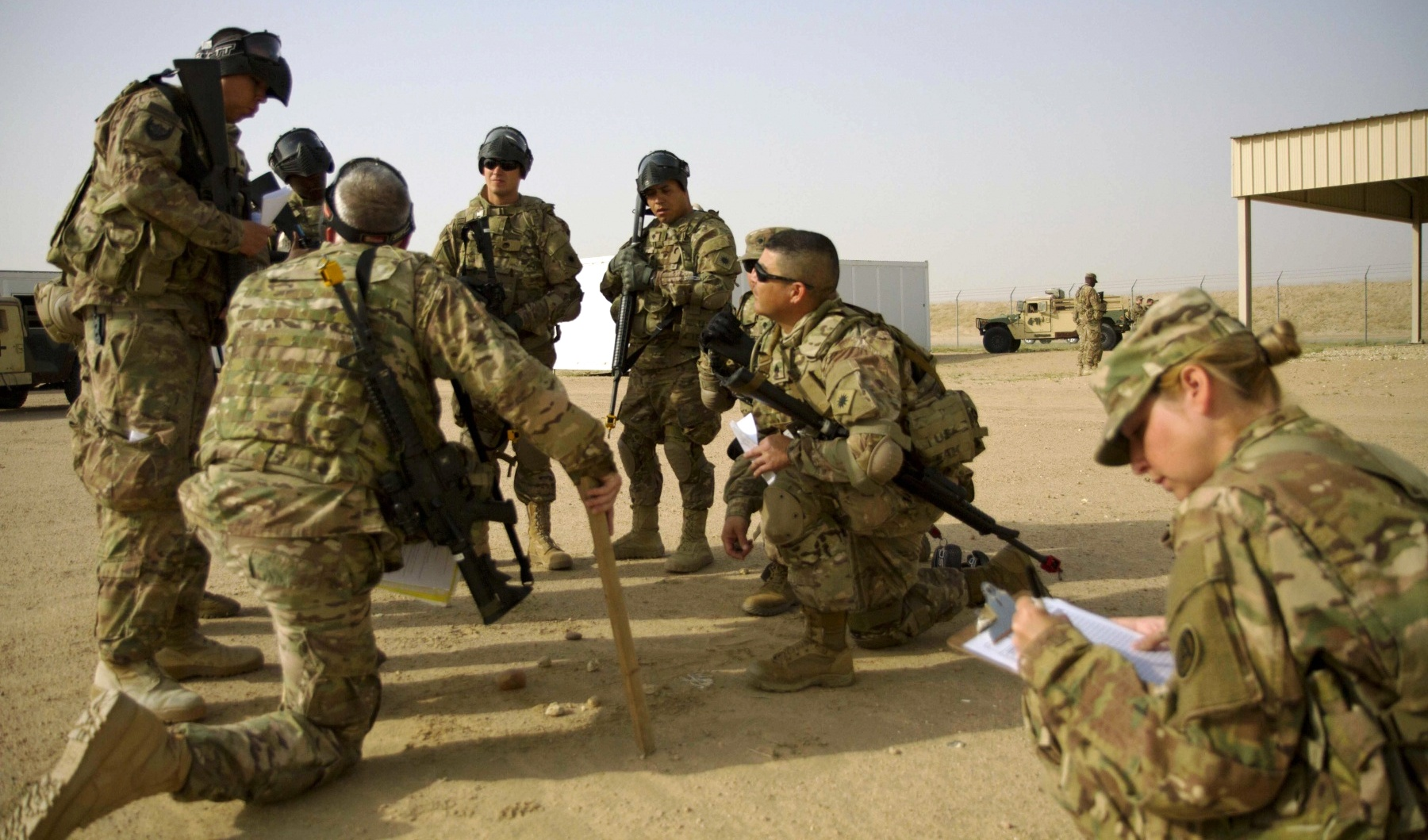
U.S. Army student squad leaders are evaluated by a Noncommissioned Officer (NCO) Academy instructor during a mission preparation exercise at Camp Buehring, Kuwait

The Basic Leader Course (BLC), formerly the Warrior Leader Course (WLC) and Primary Leadership Development Course (PLDC), is the first course of study in the US Army noncommissioned officer Professional Development System (NCOPDS). BLC is a month-long course that trains specialists and corporals in the fundamentals of leadership. As of 1 July 2021, all corporals are to have already completed BLC; in the interim those corporals who have not yet completed BLC are reassigned as specialists until they have passed the NCO promotion boards for junior leadership; specialists who have completed BLC and have been recommended for promotion are to wear corporal rank before their recommended promotion.

== Curriculum ==
The course curriculum includes instruction in leadership skills, training skills, and war-fighting skills. A passing HT/WT and ACFT score is needed to attend BLC. Soldiers with the first highest and second highest GPA, respectively, are awarded Distinguished Honor Graduate and Honor Graduate, respectively. The soldier's GPA is determined by six evaluations, and soldiers must pass the evaluations with a score of 70% or higher:

- Physical Readiness Training
- Drill and Ceremony Squad Drill
- Informative Essay
- Conduct Individual Training
- Public Speaking Presentation
- Compare and Contrast Essay

Additionally, soldiers must complete the following assessments:

- Sexual Harassment/Assault Response and Prevention (SHARP) Essay
- Weekly Leadership and Collaborative Group Work Evaluation
- Resume
- Army Combat Fitness Test (ACFT) level 1 certification

BLC is non-specific to the soldier's Military Occupational Specialty (MOS), and graduates are awarded the NCO Professional Development Ribbon. BLC is no longer worth promotion points unless the soldier receives commandants or distinguished honor grad. The next level of education is Advanced Leader Course (ALC), formerly known as Basic Noncommissioned Officer Course (BNCOC).
