= United States Armed Forces nude photo scandal =

2017 scandal in the United States

In March 2017, a nude photo scandal in the United States Armed Forces was uncovered after it was reported by the Center for Investigative Reporting and The War Horse. In early reporting, it was believed that the scandal was contained to only the Marine Corps, but was subsequently revealed to involve the rest of the military.

== Incident ==
In a closed Facebook group called "Marines United," which consisted of 30,000 active duty and retired members of the United States Armed Forces and British Royal Marines, hundreds of photos of female servicemembers from every branch of the military were distributed. The page included links to Dropbox and Google Drive with even more images. After the Facebook group was shut down, members of the original group were redirected to other groups. In a post on the original group page, a member wrote, "It would be hilarious if one of these FBI or (Naval Criminal Investigative Service) fucks found their wife on here." In one instance, a group called "Marines United 2" was created and had 3,000 members. In the MU2 group, a user identified as Garret Bailey wrote, "If you add the fuck that snitches… I will blast you on every goddamn page from here to fucking the sandbox and back. Understand this: I will not accept a request until I can see that the person has served. If they haven’t, DON’T FUCKING ADD THEM!!! If you see someone and know they are a fucking snitch, let an admin know. This shit should have never made it to the national fucking news."

== Investigation ==
The Naval Criminal Investigative Service launched an investigation into the incident.

== Reactions ==
=== US Department of Defense ===
Jim Mattis, the Secretary of Defense, said, "The purported actions of civilian and military personnel on social media websites, including some associated with the Marines United group and possibly others, represent egregious violations of the fundamental values we uphold at the Department of Defense." Robert Neller, the Commandant of the Marine Corps, said, "For anyone to target one of our Marines, online or otherwise, in an inappropriate manner, is distasteful and shows an absence of respect." Ronald L. Green, the Sergeant Major of the Marine Corps, said, "These negative behaviors are absolutely contrary to what we represent." Marine Corps spokesman Ryan Alvis thanked Thomas Brennan uncovering the scandal, saying, "It allowed us to take immediate action to have the explicit photos taken down and to prepare to support potential victims."

=== U.S. Congress ===
Senator Kirsten Gillibrand, a member of the Senate Armed Services Committee, called for a hearing on the incident. Representative Adam Smith, the ranking member of the House Armed Services Committee, called the online behavior "degrading, dangerous, and completely unacceptable."

== See also ==
- The Invisible War
