= Military sexual trauma =

U.S. legal term for sexual assault or harassment during military service

As defined by the United States Department of Veterans Affairs, military sexual trauma (MST) are experiences of sexual assault, or repeated threatening sexual harassment that occurred while a person was in the United States Armed Forces.

== Use and definition ==
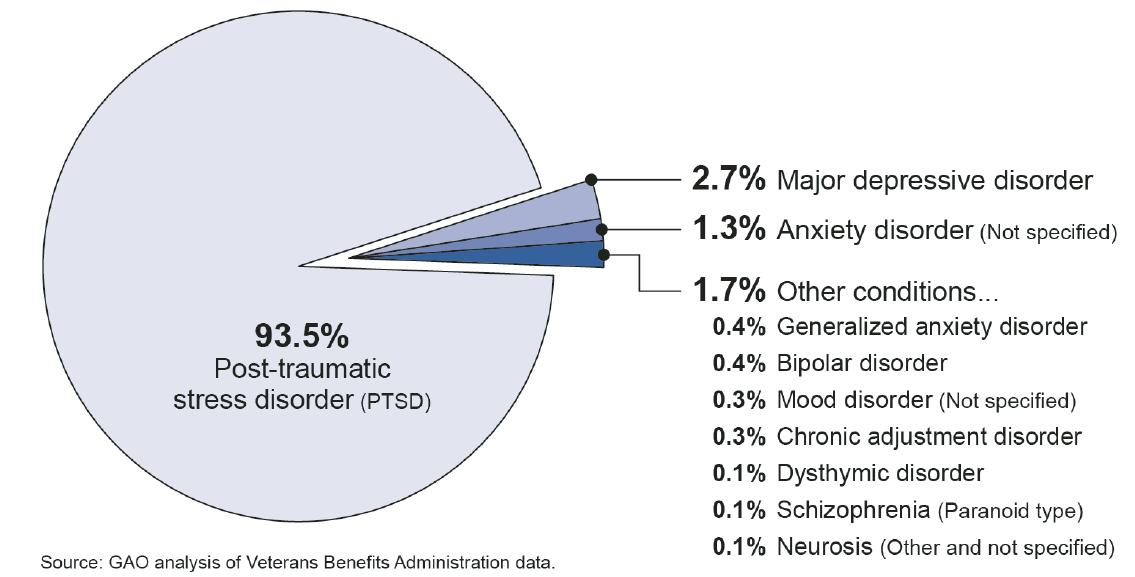
Disabilities Claimed in Relation to Military Sexual Trauma, Fiscal Year 2010 through Fiscal Year 2013.

Military sexual trauma is used by the United States Department of Veterans Affairs (VA) and defined in federal law as "psychological trauma, which in the judgment of a VA mental health professional, resulted from a physical assault of a sexual nature, battery of a sexual nature, or sexual harassment which occurred while the Veteran was serving on active duty, active duty for training, or inactive duty training". MST also includes military sexual assault (MSA) and military sexual harassment (MSH). MST is not a clinical diagnosis. It is an identifier that labels the particular circumstances a survivor incurred during their sexual assault or sexual harassment.

Sexual harassment "... means repeated, unsolicited verbal or physical contact of a sexual nature which is threatening in character". The behavior may include physical force, threats of negative consequences, implied promotion, promises of favored treatment, or intoxication of either the perpetrator or the victim or both.

== Sexual assault ==
Military Sexual Assault (MSA) is a subset of MST that does not include sexual harassment. MSA adversely affects thousands of service members during active military duty. Gross et al. (2018) defines MSA as "[i]ntentional sexual contact characterized by the use of force, threats, intimidation, or abuse of authority or when the victim does not or cannot consent that has occurred at any point during active-duty military."

MSA frequently causes survivors—both men and women—to develop mental disorders such as posttraumatic stress disorder (PTSD), anxiety disorders, and depressive disorders. PTSD is a mental health diagnosis that can occur after a traumatic event including combat. Factors related to higher risk of MSA are; "younger age, enlisted rank, being nonmarried, and low educational achievement". 15–49% of women and 1.5–22.5% of men experience sexual trauma prior to military service which has been shown to increase one's risk of sexual assault later on. MSA occurs more often in sexual and gender minorities. MSA occurs within an institution which may perpetuate trauma symptoms.

=== Institutional betrayal ===
Survivors of MSA often work alongside their perpetrators which accounts for the institutional betrayal that survivors experience in the military. Institutional betrayal is defined as "an organization's action (or inactions) are complicit in a person's trauma, especially when the traumatized person depends on the institution". Institutional betrayal can occur to anyone who trusts or depends on an organization. Distrust among service members can increase when finding out about another person's MSA. Research suggests that female veterans are less likely to trust their institution after MSA than male veterans. MSA has been shown to occur more in the Navy and Marines than in other branches of the military.

For survivors of MSA, the experience of institutional betrayal was found to negatively affect willingness to utilize Veterans Health Administration (VHA) medical and mental health care. Institutional betrayal was additionally found to impact the type of health care sought by survivors of MSA. Despite the availability of free health care through VHA, non-VHA mental health care was found to be more preferable.

=== Posttraumatic stress disorder (PTSD) and depression ===
Research has shown that sexual assault can contribute to PTSD, substance use, and depression. Experiencing MSA has been connected to developing PTSD and depression at a higher rate than if an individual does not experience MSA. However, MSA is connected to PTSD in female and male veterans while depression just among female veterans. MSA, in combinations with other military stressors, can cause mental health problems. MSA in transgender veterans resulted in PTSD, depression, and personality disorders.

=== Substance use disorder (SUD) ===
Female veterans who experience MST are at an increased risk for SUD. The prevalence of SUD doubled in female veterans suffering from MST (10.2% positive for MST vs. 4.7% negative for MST). Additionally, SUD commonly occurs alongside Posttraumatic Stress (PTS) and PTSD. In female veterans, research shows that MSA survivors with high PTS symptomatology are more likely to report SUD. The increases in SUD diagnosis and MST calls for trauma-informed treatment.

=== Male veterans ===
Sexual assault happens to men within the military as well: 3–12% of men have experienced MSA. Men who experience sexual assault may have issues with reporting based on stigma. Male veterans who experienced sexual assault were twice as likely to attempt suicide than male veterans who had not been sexually assaulted. Research has shown that Iraqi/Afghanistan-era male veterans reporting MSA displayed higher negative functional and psychiatric outcomes. Studies have also shown that MSA in male veterans did not result in significant problems with controlling violent behavior, incarceration, or lower social support.

=== Female veterans ===
In females, harassment in the military is associated with higher rates of PTSD. Research suggests that female veterans experience MSA more than male veterans,. specifically that 9–41% of female veterans have experienced MSA. For female veterans in Operation Enduring Freedom (OEF) and Operation Iraqi Freedom, MSA is a significant predictor of Major Depressive Disorder (MDD). These female veterans all experienced combat and therefore MSA was not a significant predictor of PTSD whereas combat stress was.

=== Gender and sexual minorities ===
==== Lesbian, gay, bisexual (LGB) veterans ====
LGB veterans are more likely to have PTSD symptoms than heterosexual individuals after being exposed to combat stress and other factors. PTSD symptomatology, in LGB Veterans, is linked to depression and substance use. LGB veterans report being victimized by discrimination and stigmatizing labels more often than non-LGB individuals. Due to compounded identity-based stressors, LGB service members and veterans are also at higher risk for suicide attempts compared to civilians. Having experienced MSA places LGB individuals in the military at an amplified risk for suicide, beyond civilians and those who have not experienced an MSA. LGB veterans have a higher rate of lifetime sexual assault some of which can occur during military service. Research suggests that LGB veterans experience MSA at a higher rate than non-LGB veterans. Gay and Bisexual male veterans are more likely to experience MSA than non-LGB male veterans. There is a significantly higher rate of PTSD in LGB female veterans than non-LGB female veterans.

Regarding prevalence:

- 15.5% of gay, bisexual male veterans compared to 3.5% non-LGB male veterans report MSA.
- 41.2% PTSD rate in LGB female veterans compared to 29.8% non-LGB female veterans.

==== Transgender veterans ====
At this point, there is very little research done on MST and/or MSA with transgender veterans. The Minority Stress Model has been used to explain the impact of MSA and other stressors on the mental health of transgender veterans. Minority stress refers to chronic stress experienced by individuals within a stigmatized group. Distal Minority Stressors have been defined as; "external events of prejudice and discrimination". Whereas Proximal Minority Stressors have been defined as; "internal processes, such as feelings of stress, anxiety, and concern, regarding concealment of true gender identity". Studies have found that MSA is associated with minority stress and should be processed with transgender veterans along with the trauma of MSA. In one survey, 17.2% of transgender veterans reported MSA.

== Prevalence ==
Military sexual trauma is a serious issue faced by the United States armed forces. In 2012, 13,900 men and 12,100 women who were active duty service members reported unwanted sexual contact while in 2016, 10,600 men and 9,600 women reported being sexually assaulted. Further, there were 5,240 official reports of sexual assault involving service members as victims in 2016; however, it is estimated that 77% of service member sexual assaults go unreported. More specifically, prevalence of MST among veterans returning from Operation Enduring Freedom (OEF) in Afghanistan and Operation Iraqi Freedom (OIF) in Iraq, was reported to be as high as 15.1% among females and 0.7% among males. In a study conducted in 2014, 196 female veterans who had deployed to OIF and/or OEF were interviewed and 41% of them reported experiencing MST. As a result of these and similar findings, 17 former service members filed a lawsuit in 2010 accusing the Department of Defense of allowing a military culture that fails to prevent rapes and sexual assaults. According to the Department of Defense Task Force on Sexual Violence (2004) perpetrators of sexual assault were often male, serving in the military, and knew the victim well.

== Reporting ==
Currently, the U.S. military allows victims of MST to make either restricted or unrestricted reports of sexual assault. This two tier system includes restricted (anonymous) and unrestricted reporting. A restricted report, allows victims to receive access to counseling and medical resources without disclosing their assault to authorities or seeking litigation against the perpetrator(s). This is different from an unrestricted report which involves seeking criminal charges against the perpetrator, eliminating anonymity. The restricted reporting option is meant to reduce negative social consequences suffered by MST survivors, increase MST reporting and in doing so improve the accuracy of information concerning MST prevalence. According to the DOD Annual Report on Sexual Assault in the Military (2016) in 2015, there were 4,584 Unrestricted Reports involving Service members as either victims or subjects and 1,900 Restricted Reports involving Service members as either victims or subjects. The Services do not investigate Restricted Reports and do not record the identities of alleged perpetrators. Service members who experience MST are eligible for medical care, mental healthcare, legal services, and spiritual support related to MST through the VA.

U.S. military members appear to fear repercussions, retaliation, and the stigma associated with reporting MST. The reasons service members do not report military sexual assaults include concerns about confidentiality, wanting to "move on", not wanting to seem "weak", fear about career repercussions, fear of stigmatization, and worry about retaliation by superiors and fellow service members. Additionally, survivors of MST may believe that nothing will be done if they report a sexual assault, they may blame themselves, and/or they may fear for their reputation.

=== Effects of stigma on reporting rates ===
Stigma is a significant deterrent to reporting MST. Many military service members do not report sexual abuse due to fear about not being believed, worry about career impact, fear of retribution, or because their victimization will be minimized with comments such as "suck it up". Additionally, perceived stigma associated with seeking mental health treatment after experiencing MST affects reporting. Service members often do not disclose any type of trauma (sexual assault or battlefield trauma) until asked specifically by a mental health professional due to mental health stigma, worry about career difficulties, or because they wish to preserve their masculine image.

Additionally, reporting MST sometimes results in an individual being diagnosed with a personality disorder, resulting in a discharge other than honorable, and reducing access to benefits from the VA or state. A diagnosis of a personality disorder also discounts or minimizes the credibility of the victim and may result in stigmatization by the civilian community. Many survivors of MST report that they experience rejection from the military and feel incompetent after an Unrestricted Report.

=== Consequences of reporting ===
In spite of increased access to medical and mental health resources there are also important drawbacks to unrestricted reports of MST. MST survivors often report a loss of professional and personal identity. They are also at increased risk of re-traumatization and retaliation through the process of getting help. Service members may experience re-traumatization through blame, misdiagnosis, and being questioned about the validity of their experience. Retaliation from reporting a sexual complaint may have distressing consequences for the victim and weakens the respectful culture of the military. Retaliation can refer to reprisal, ostracism, maltreatment or abusive behavior by co-workers, exclusion by peers, or disruption of their career. The Department of Defense Task Force on Sexual Violence (2004) reported that unkind gossip was the most common problem that members experienced at work in response to a MST report. In 2015, 68% of survivors reported at least one negative experience associated with their report of sexual assault. The Department of Defense Annual Report on Sexual Assault in the Military (2016) indicates that approximately 61% of retaliation reports involved a man or multiple men as alleged retaliators, while nearly 27% of reports included multiple men and women as retaliators. The majority (73%) of retaliators were not the alleged perpetrator of the associated sexual assault or sexual harassment. More than half (58%) of the alleged retaliators were in the chain of command of the reporter, followed by peers, co-workers, friends, or family members of the reporter, or a superior not in the reporters chain of command. Infrequently (7%), the alleged sexual perpetrator was also the alleged retaliator.

Of the members of the military, 85% are active duty and male. Although more men than women in the military experience sexual assault, a larger proportion of female victims report their assault to military authorities. In 2004, of service members who said they reported their experiences, 33% of women and 28% of men were satisfied with the complaint outcome, meaning approximately two thirds of women and men were dissatisfied. Service members who felt satisfied with the outcome of their report indicated that the situation was corrected, the outcome of the report was explained to them, and some action was taken against the offender. Service members who were dissatisfied with the outcome reported that nothing was done about their complaint. Since changes in reporting standards were implemented in 2012, military sexual assault reporting has increased significantly. Since this change, most service members report instances of MST to their direct supervisor, another person in their chain of command, or the offender's supervisor, rather than to a military special office or civilian authority.

Individuals who make a report and deny mental health evaluations could be given a dishonorable discharge for making false allegations. Therefore, victims are sent the message to "keep quiet and deal with it" rather than reporting the assault and possibly losing their career and military benefits. In fact, 23% of women and 15% of men reported that action was taken against them because of their complaint. Additionally, according to an investigation by the Human Rights Watch in 2016, many survivors reported they received more disciplinary notices, were seen as "troublemakers", assigned undesirable shift assignments, were intimidated by drill sergeants, were threatened by peers with comments such as "you got what you deserved", and were socially isolated and further assaulted due to fear of more retaliation after an initial report.

== Psychological/physiological difficulties ==
=== General ===
Service members who experiences MST may experience increased emotional and physical distress as well as feelings of shame, hopelessness, and betrayal. Some of the psychological experiences of both male and female survivors include: depression, symptoms of post-traumatic stress disorder (PTSD), mood disorders, dissociative reactions, isolation from others, and self-harm. Medical symptoms survivors have experienced include sexual difficulties, chronic pain, weight gain, gastrointestinal problems and eating disorders. In 2017, a study found that MST increases the chances a female survivor will become a victim of Intimate partner violence (IPV).

=== Sexual minorities ===
According to research, reports of MST have been shown to be higher among veteran populations compared to current active duty personnel and DoD estimates. Specifically within the lesbian, gay, and bisexual (LGB) veteran community, who are significantly more likely to have experienced military sexual assault (MSA) (32.7% of combined female and male veterans) than non-LGB veterans (16.4%).

Individuals identifying as a sexual minority are at a greater risk for MSA than their heterosexual counterparts (32% vs. 16.4%). Suffering from MSA causes psychological effects on veterans, often identified as PTSD, depression, anxiety, and substance abuse. The disparity between heterosexual and non-heterosexual individuals’ exposure to MSA creates a divide in likelihood of psychological effects. LGB veterans reported more likely to have PTSD after leaving the military (41.2% vs. non-LGB 29.8%). Veterans identifying with a sexual minority have reported to suffer from depression at a higher percentage than their heterosexual counterparts (49.7% vs. 36.0%). After enduring MSA, many victims experience feelings of shame and disgrace, causing individuals of sexual minorities who suffered MSA to project hatred inwards because of the norms placed upon them by the heterosexual society. The military has released LGB people from the branches of service based on their sexual orientation. The military has prohibited openly LGB individuals from enlisting in the military through the use of,“Don’t Ask, Don’t tell”. According to “American Psychologist”, the creation of a negative sexual stigma regarding homosexuality in the military has caused aggression against sexual minorities. The increased risk of sexual assault that LGB service members are exposed to causes victims to be more likely exposed to the physical post-MSA side effects, which includes weight gain, weight loss, and HIV.

== Interpersonal difficulties ==
MST is a significant predictor of interpersonal difficulties post-deployment. Holland and colleagues (2015) found that survivors who perceived greater logistical barriers to obtaining mental health care reported more symptoms of depression and PTSD. Particularly for women veterans, PTSD and suicide are major concerns. Males experiencing MST are associated with greater PTSD symptom severity, greater depression symptom severity, higher suicidality, and higher outpatient mental health treatment. In general, male veterans who report experiencing MST are younger, less likely to be currently married, more likely to be diagnosed with a mood disorder, and more likely to have experienced non-MST sexual abuse either as children or adults than military members who have not been victimized. However, the strongest predictor of any of these negative mental health outcomes, for either gender, includes anticipating public stigma (i.e., worrying about being blamed for the assault).

== Treatment services ==
In 2004 the Department of Defense (DOD) launched a task force that identified that service members who had faced sexual assault and harassment while deployed were in need of specialized medical treatments. As a result of these findings, the DOD created the Sexual Assault Prevention Response (US military) and ignited efforts to prevent, educate, provide adequate medical care for survivors and accountability for perpetrators.

The Veterans Health Administration (VHA) provides medical and mental health services free of charge to enrolled veterans who report MST and has implemented universal screening for MST among all veterans receiving VA health care.

The Military Sexual Trauma Movement (MSTM) advocates for legislative and social reforms that would offer greater protections and resources to veterans who have experience MST, such as extending state veterans benefits to veterans who received "bad paper" discharges as a consequence of reporting MST. The MSTM also allows servicemembers to report sexual harassment and abuse online.

== Disability benefits ==
The Veterans Benefits Administration (VBA), a component of the United States Department of Veterans Affairs (VA), manages claims and the provision of disability benefits, including tax-free cash compensation, for veterans with service-connected injuries and disorders.

Veterans who endured military sexual trauma are eligible for VA disability benefits if MST was "at least as likely as not" the cause of a mental disorder (or aggravated a pre-existing mental disorder). A special provision in federal regulations lessens the burden of proof for veterans with MST-related posttraumatic stress disorder.

A law that went into effect in January 2021 adds a new statute to the United States Code that requires the Department of Veterans Affairs to "establish specialized teams to process claims for compensation for a covered mental health condition based on military sexual trauma", and specifically defines "a covered mental health condition" as "post-traumatic stress disorder, anxiety, depression, or other mental health diagnosis described in the current version of the Diagnostic and Statistical Manual of Mental Disorders published by the American Psychiatric Association that the Secretary determines to be related to military sexual trauma."

== See also ==
- Effects and aftermath of rape
- The Invisible War
- LaVena Johnson
- Intimate partner violence and U.S. military populations
- Panayiota Bertzikis
- Psychological trauma
- Sexual assault in the United States military
- Sexual assault in the military
- Misconduct in the military
- Dedovshchina
- War rape
- Tailhook Scandal
- Vanessa Guillen
