= Lackland Air Force Base =

US Air Force base near San Antonio, Texas

Lackland Air Force Base
- Part of Joint Base San Antonio
- Bexar County, Texas
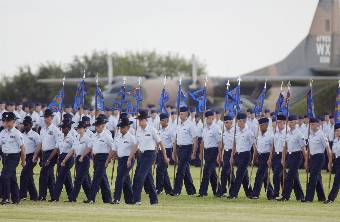
- Military Training Instructors and trainees participating in the Basic Military Training graduation parade.

Site information
- Type: Air Force Base
- Owner: Department of Defense
- Operator: United States Air Force
- Controlled by: Air Education and Training Command (AETC)
- Website: www.basictraining.af.mil

Location
- Location of Lackland Air Force Base
- Coordinates: 29°23′17″N 98°37′15″W

Site history
- Built: 1941
- In use: 1941–present

Garrison information
- Garrison: 802d Mission Support Group

Airfield information
- Identifiers: IATA: SKF, ICAO: KSKF, FAA LID: SKF
- Elevation: 211 m (691 ft) AMSL
Runways
Direction	Length and surface
16/34	3,520 m (11,550 ft) Concrete

Lackland Air Force Base (IATA: SKF, ICAO: KSKF, FAA LID: SKF) is a United States Air Force (USAF) base located in Bexar County, Texas, United States. The base is under the jurisdiction of the 802d Mission Support Group, Air Education and Training Command (AETC) and an enclave of the city of San Antonio. It is the only site for USAF and United States Space Force enlisted Basic Military Training (BMT).

Lackland AFB is part of Joint Base San Antonio (JBSA), an amalgamation of Fort Sam Houston, Randolph AFB and Lackland AFB, which were merged on 1 October 2010. JBSA was established in accordance with congressional legislation implementing the recommendations of the 2005 Base Realignment and Closure Commission. The legislation ordered the consolidation of the three facilities which were adjoining, but separate military installations, into a single joint base – one of 12 joint bases formed in the United States as a result of the law.

== Units ==
United States Air Force

- 502nd Installation Support Group

A unit of the JBSA 502nd Air Base Wing, the 502nd ISG is the focal point for all base activities, serving and supporting the 37th and 737th Training Groups and all of its mission partners as well as the more than 24,000 retirees living in the local area.

- 37th Training Wing

37th Training Group
Provides professional, military and technical training in the knowledge and skills needed for graduates to perform their jobs worldwide. Joint service training for USAF, U.S. Army, U.S. Navy and U.S. Marine Corps personnel is provided in numerous courses, such as the military working dog program and security and law enforcement
737th Training Group
Provides Basic Military Training for all enlisted people entering the USAF, Air Force Reserve and Air National Guard, earning Lackland the nickname, "Gateway to the Air Force." The group was the center of the United States Air Force Basic Training scandal, 2012. Since 2020, it has also provided basic training for enlisted recruits to the United States Space Force.

- Sixteenth Air Force

Operates, maintains and defends the USAF information networks and directs mission critical cyber terrain, provides multisource intelligence, surveillance, and reconnaissance products, and is the Service Cryptologic Component responsible to the National Security Agency's Central Security Service for Air Force matters involving the conduct of cryptologic activities.

- 624th Operations Center

Interfaces with theater and functional Air Operations Centers to establish, plan, direct, coordinate, assess, and command & control cyber operations in support of USAF and Joint warfighting requirements. The 624th Operations Center was inactivated in 2020.

Department of Defense

- Inter-American Air Forces Academy

Fostering enduring Inter-American engagement through education and training. Teaches 37 technical courses, in Spanish and in English, to students from more than 22 countries every year.

- Defense Language Institute

Primary mission was to teach English to Allied pilot candidates. In 1966, its mission expanded to include other career fields, and the school moved under the Department of Defense with the U.S. Army as the executive agent.

National Security Agency

- Texas Cryptologic Center

Lackland AFB hosts a collection of vintage military aircraft on static display on its parade grounds as part of the USAF Airman Heritage Museum, including a Boeing B-52 Stratofortress, McDonnell Douglas F-4 Phantom II, Lockheed SR-71 Blackbird, Boeing B-29 Superfortress, Lockheed C-121 Constellation, Boeing B-17 Flying Fortress and a North American B-25 Mitchell.

== Training mission ==
Lackland Air Force Base is home to the 37th Training Wing (37 TRW) which operates a variety of training squadrons. Within the 37th TRW is the 37th Training Group (37 TRG) which oversees the 5 technical training schools on the base, and the 737 TRG which oversees the Basic Military Training squadrons.

=== Basic training (enlisted) ===
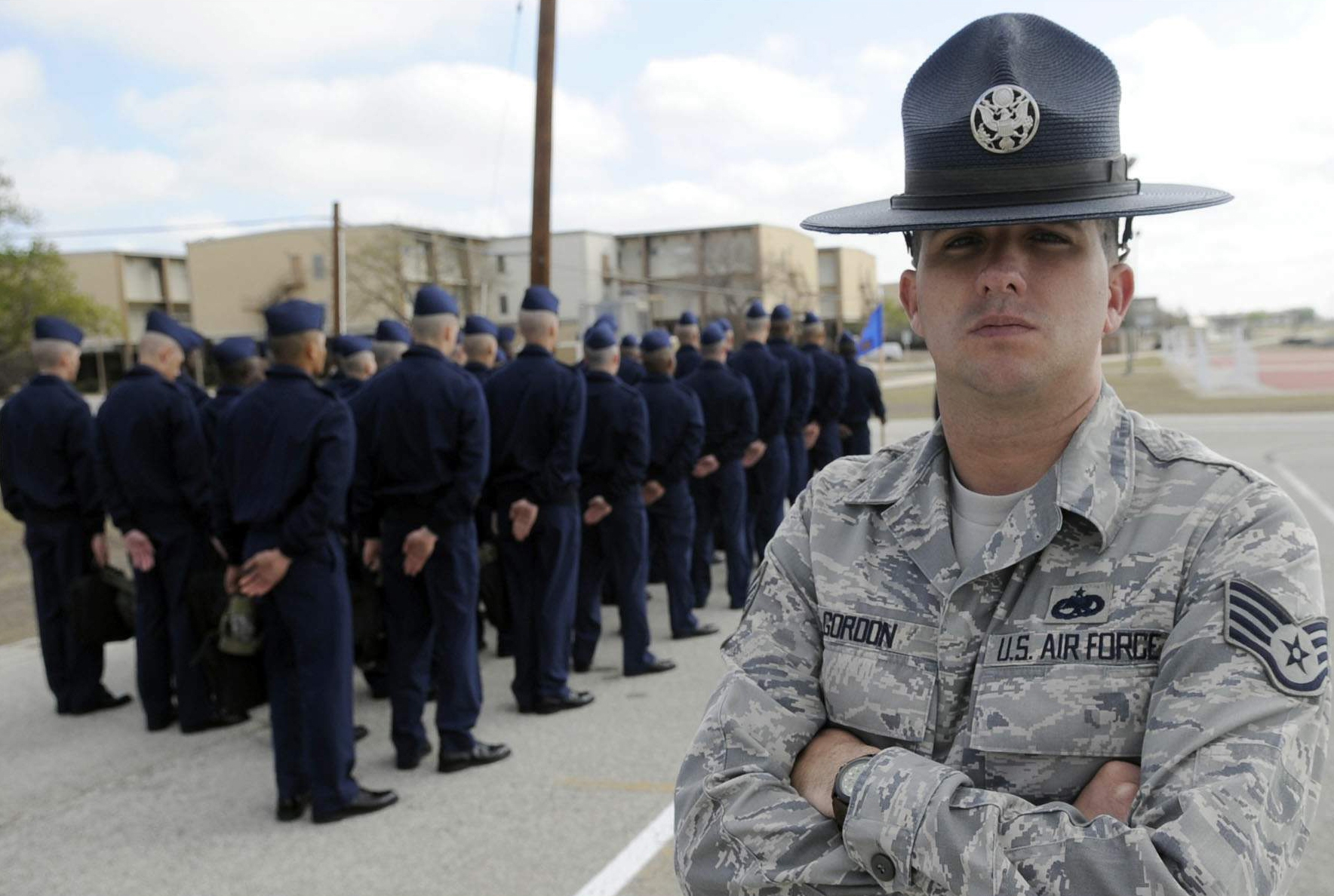
A Staff Sergeant Military Training Instructor (MTI) at Lackland in 2009. RH&T dormitories in background.

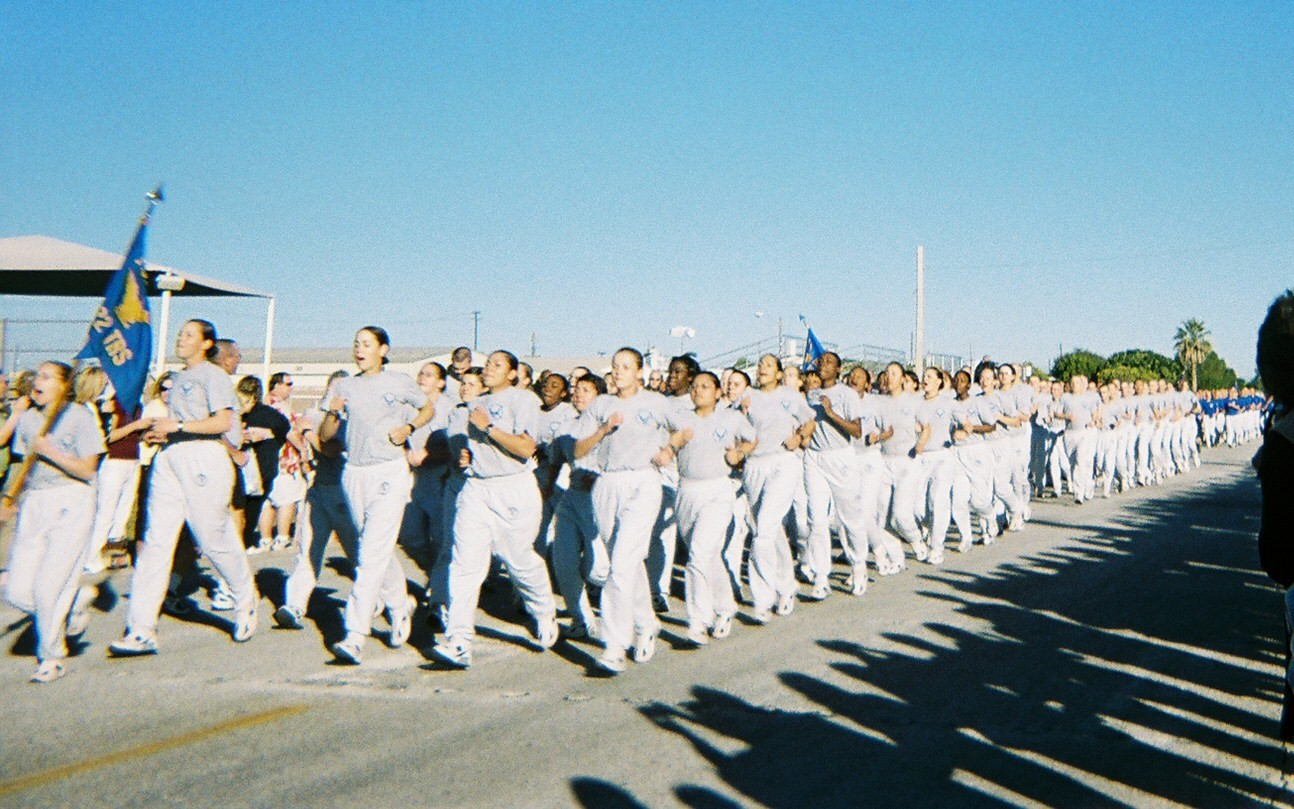
A group of Airmen taking part in the Airman's Run, the final run before graduation.

Lackland is best known for its role in being the sole location for U.S. Air Force enlisted Basic Military Training (BMT) for the active duty Regular Air Force, Air Force Reserve and Air National Guard. BMT is organized into nine basic training squadrons, each with their own training site on the base. Each squadron is equipped with either a dining facility or a medical clinic. Some BMT squadrons share dining facilities if they are located close enough together and the same is true for medical clinics. Each squadron also has a specific exercise area where basic trainees conduct physical readiness training (PRT). Also, AFOSI anti-terrorism teams are trained here.

In October 2008 the BMT was expanded an extra two weeks to implement more air base defense training as well as other rudimentary skills. The BMT course of training is 8 1/2 weeks.

=== Officer training ===
Prior to 22 September 1993, Lackland AFB's Medina Annex was also home to Air Force Officer Training School (OTS), one of three USAF officer accession and commissioning sources in addition to the U.S. Air Force Academy and Air Force ROTC. On 25 September 1993, OTS permanently relocated to Maxwell AFB, Alabama During the period of the Vietnam War a section of Lackland AFB was reserved for Officer Training as part of an Officer Candidate overflow to meet critical war manpower needs. Training building was in Femoyer Hall. An OT Club was also located there. OT Squadrons 7,8 and 9 were housed in the old WW2 barracks using bldgs 10402 +

=== Technical training ===
Lackland, like many other Air Education and Training Command (AETC) bases, trains enlisted airmen out of basic training in a specific specialty via various "tech schools." Lackland currently has six technical training squadrons on base training multiple airmen in various Air Force Specialty Codes (AFSCs).

- The 37th Training Group supports the following five training squadrons and also trains technical training instructors, military training instructors and military training leaders.
- The 341st Training Squadron trains military working dogs and handlers for the entire Department of Defense and several federal agencies.
- The 342nd Training Squadron teaches Pararescuemen (PJs), Combat Controllers, Special Reconnaissance (SR), Tactical Air Control Party (TACPs) Special Warfare Airmen, Survival, Evasion, Resistance and Escape (SERE) Specialists, and a variety of advanced Security Forces courses.
- The 343rd TRS trains airmen to become Security Forces members in a 13-week academy.
- The 344th TRS provides technical training for more than 10,000 active duty, Reserve, Guard, international and civilian students annually in Career Enlisted Aviator, Vehicle Maintenance, Logistics Readiness Officer, Logistics Plans, Materiel Management, Contracting, Recruiting, Safety, Cryptological, and TEMPEST courses.
- The 345th TRS trains, develops and educates technical training students into skilled graduates in the Services, Air Transportation, Hazardous Material Transportation School (HAZMAT) and Traffic Management Office career fields..

== History ==
=== World War II ===
Construction on Lackland Air Force Base began on 15 June 1941, and it was originally part of Kelly Field. One year later, it became an independent organization – the San Antonio Aviation Cadet Center (SAAC). On 8 January 1943, the War Department constituted and activated the 78th Flying Training Wing (Preflight) at San Antonio and assigned it to the United States Army Air Force's Central Flying Training Command. The 78th Wing provided aviation cadets the mechanics and physics of flight and required the cadets to pass courses in mathematics and the hard sciences. Then the cadets were taught to apply their knowledge practically by teaching them aeronautics, deflection shooting, and thinking in three dimensions. Once completed, the graduates were designated as aviation cadets and were sent to one of the primary flight schools for pilot training.

=== Cold War ===
On 3 February 1948, the facility was named Lackland AFB after Brigadier General Frank Lackland, who was commissioned into the regular Army after serving in the District of Columbia National Guard. The 3700th Basic Training Wing was activated on 26 August 1948, and the 3700th Wing was to stay with various changes of name until 1959.

As a result of the Korean War, training populations at Lackland soared to 28 basic military training squadrons (BMTS) within the 3700th Military Training Wing. Temporary facilities, to include 129 "I dormitories", were hastily erected as a quick fix to replace tents cities housing recruits. Sampson Air Force Base in New York also ran Basic Military Training during the Korean War. In 1955 the number of BMTS was reduced to 16, where it remained for the next two decades.

The Vietnam War buildup necessitated a "split-phase" training from August 1965 to April 1966. This program provided for 22 days at Lackland and 8 days at a technical school, with directed duty assignees receiving the full 30 days at Lackland. When BMT returned to a single phase on 1 April 1966, it was briefly cut back to 24 days from April to July 1966. After that, basic training stabilized at a length of six weeks. This was the same length as the program used by the Army Air Forces when Lackland opened as a basic training base 20 years before. Amarillo Air Force Base also ran BMT during the Vietnam War, until Amarillo's closure in 1968. Training requirements also expanded to include teaching English to Allied military members from foreign countries.

No other item in the 1960s compared to the incident that occurred at Lackland in February 1966 with the death of a basic trainee. An airman died of spinal meningitis and while ten other cases were confirmed, no other deaths were reported. Virtually all non-essential activities requiring gatherings of basic trainees were canceled. To control the issue further, a cadre of personnel was assigned to activate the 3330th Basic Military Training School at Amarillo AFB in Amarillo, Texas, in February 1966. As a result of the continuing expansion of the USAF, Amarillo AFB continued to conduct basic training until December 1968.

During the 1960s, more permanent facilities were constructed, including four 1,000-person steel and brick Recruit Housing and Training (RH&T) dormitories built between 1966 and 1970 for basic military training by the Lackland Military Training Center. These state-of-the-art buildings included living space, dining halls, and training areas for four basic training squadrons under one roof. Eventually six full-size dormitories, and two 600-person facilities, were constructed, enabling excess space to be converted to classroom use.

=== Air Defense Command ===
In late 1951, Air Defense Command selected Lackland AFB as one of twenty-eight radar stations built as part of the second segment of the permanent radar surveillance network. Prompted by the start of the Korean War, on 11 July 1950, the Secretary of the Air Force asked the Secretary of Defense for approval to expedite construction of the second segment of the permanent network. Receiving the Defense Secretary's approval on 21 July, the Air Force directed the Corps of Engineers to proceed with construction.

On 1 February 1953, the 741st Aircraft Control and Warning Squadron was activated at Lackland (P-75) 29°23′16.4″N 98°37′59.9″W with an AN/FPS-3 search radar and an AN/FPS-4 height-finder radar. In 1958 the AN/FPS-4 height-finder radar was replaced by AN/FPS-6 and AN/FPS-6A sets.

By late 1959, Lackland was also performing air-traffic-control duties for the Federal Aviation Administration (FAA). At this time the site hosted an AN/FPS-20A radar. One AN/FPS-6 was retired by 1963. On 31 July 1963, the site was redesignated as NORAD ID Z-75.

In addition to the main facility, Lackland operated an AN/FPS-14 Gap Filler site:

- Schulenburg, TX (P-75A): 29°45′42.8″N 096°55′51.2″W

In 1965, AN/FPS-20A was upgraded to an AN/FPS-91A radar, then in 1969 it was modified to an AN/FPS-66A. The 741st Aircraft Control and Warning Squadron was inactivated in December 1969, and the FAA assumed control of the radar site.

In September 1972, the Houston-based 630th Radar Squadron sent a detachment (OL-D) to this FAA-operated site to set up an AN/FPS-6 height-finder radar to join the AN/FPS-66A search radar already in place (Z-241). The Air Force ceased using the Lackland AFB radar site on 30 September 1976.

The Lackland ADC site was taken over by the FAA (also known as 'San Antonio') and remained in operation for a number of years. This then-FAA long-range radar site was data-tied into the Joint Surveillance System. The site operated the AN/FPS-66A search radar. However, the radar facility has been deactivated, and all the structures have been razed.

=== Post–Cold War era ===
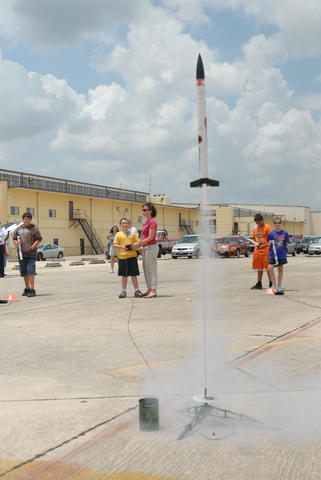
A student launches his model rocket during STARBASE Kelly, a five-day summer camp providing math, science and technology education to fourth, fifth and sixth-graders.

From the end of the Cold War, Base Realignment and Closure (BRAC) actions in the 1990s relocated several specialized training programs at Lackland. This included Air Education and Training Command's relocation of Air Force Officer Training School (OTS) from Lackland to Maxwell AFB in Montgomery, Alabama.

Lackland gained a flying mission when adjacent Kelly AFB closed in 2001. The two-mile-long runway is now a joint-use facility between Lackland AFB and Port San Antonio. The portion of the former Kelly AFB still under USAF control is now known as Lackland AFB/Kelly Field Annex and its permanently based flying units include the Air Force Reserve Command's (AFRC) 433d Airlift Wing, an Air Mobility Command (AMC)-gained unit flying the C-5 Galaxy and the 149th Fighter Wing of the Texas Air National Guard, an AETC-gained unit flying the F-16 Fighting Falcon. The civilian side of the former Kelly AFB is now known as Port San Antonio and hosts numerous major DoD defense contractors such as Boeing and Lockheed Martin. These contractors support major overhaul and repair of military aircraft in facilities previously occupied by the Air Force's former San Antonio Air Logistics Center (SA-ALC) when Kelly was an active Logistics Command (AFLC) and Materiel Command (AFMC) installation.

In addition, with the closure of Kelly AFB, Lackland gained the section of base known as Security Hill. Security Hill is home to numerous units such as Air Combat Command's 24th Air Force and 67th Network Warfare Wing and the Air Force Intelligence, Surveillance and Reconnaissance Agency. All units on Security Hill are considered tenant units.

Lackland now consists of the Kelly airstrip, Security Hill, main base Lackland, and the old Medina officer training base now named Medina/Lackland Training Annex. With the exception of a few buildings most of the old Kelly air base including the housing has been turned over to civilian jurisdiction.

On 15 May 2009, USAF officials announced that Lackland is the preferred alternative location for the 24th Air Force.

In winter of 2009 it was decided to combine all the military bases in San Antonio into one large base named Joint Base San Antonio.

In April 2012 Lackland served as an overflow shelter for an influx of illegal immigrant minors after the Administration for Children and Families determined that all other local shelters were filled to capacity.

On 28 October 2013, the Military Working Dog Teams National Monument was unveiled during a dedication ceremony with full military fanfare. The U.S. National Monument was authorized with the passage of Public Law 110–181, Section 2877, (having been introduced to Congress by Rep. Walter B. Jones) which was passed by the United States Congress and signed into law by President George W. Bush. The monument was built next to the Basic Military Training Parade Field, that location being chosen due to the historical significance of the base as the training center and headquarters of the United States Department of Defense Military Working Dog Program.

=== Sexual assault scandal ===
In the United States Air Force Basic Training scandal, involving sexual assault on the base, dozens of female and male recruits said that they were sexually harassed or raped by their instructors from 2010 onward.

=== 2016 shooting ===
On 8 April 2016, an airman on the base shot and killed a squadron commander, then killed himself.

=== Kelly Field Renaming ===
In December 2017, Lackland AFB renamed Kelly Field Annex to Kelly Field to commemorate the 100 year anniversary of the airfield becoming property of the US Government and to better fit its joint nature

=== Chapman Training Annex renaming ===
On 4 March 2020, Medina Training Annex was renamed to Chapman Training Annex after Medal of Honor recipient Master Sgt. John A. Chapman

== Demographics ==
Lackland AFB CDP
- Census-designated place
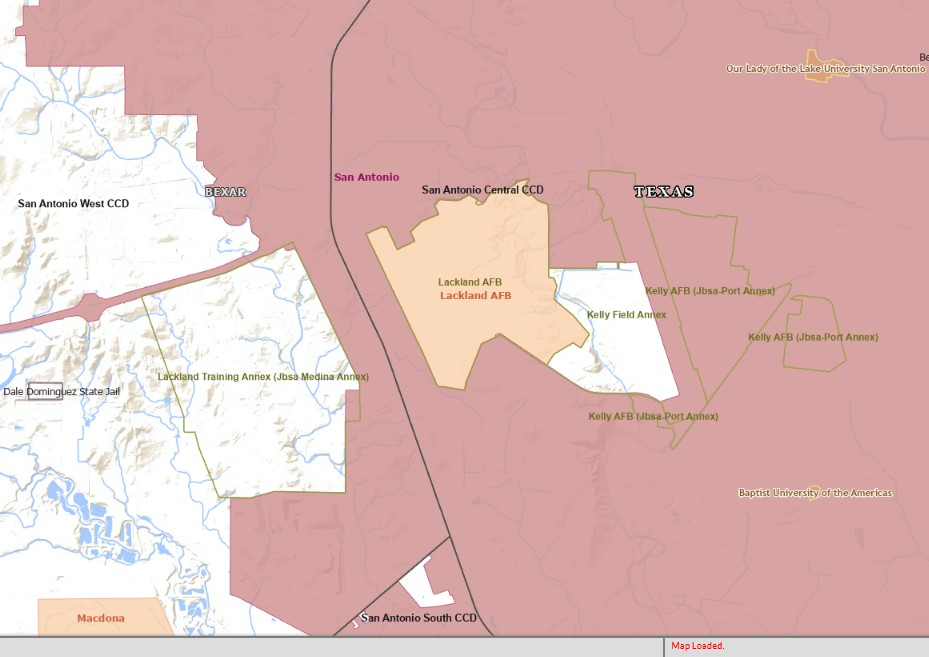
- Interactive map of Lackland AFB CDP
- Coordinates: 29°23′12″N 98°37′04″W
- Country: United States
- State: Texas
- County: Bexar
- Elevation: 643 ft (196 m)

Population (2020)
  - Total: 9,467
- Time zone: UTC-6 (Central (CST))
  - Summer (DST): UTC-5 (CDT)
- GNIS feature ID: 2512527

Lackland Air Force Base CDP is a census-designated place (CDP) covering the permanent residential population of the Lackland Air Force Base in Bexar County, Texas, United States. It first appeared as an unincorporated community in the 1970 United States census and then as a census-designated place in the 1980 United States census. Per the 2020 United States census, the population was 9,467. It does include the Kelly Field annex or the Lackland training annex.

Historical population
Census	Pop.	Note	%±
1970	19,141		—
1980	14,459		−24.5%
1990	9,352		−35.3%
2000	7,123		−23.8%
2010	9,918		39.2%
2020	9,467		−4.5%
U.S. Decennial Census; 1850–1900 1910; 1920 1930 1940; 1950 1960 1970; 1980 1990 2000; 2010 2020

=== 2020 census ===
Lackland AFB CDP, Texas – Racial and ethnic composition Note: the US Census treats Hispanic/Latino as an ethnic category. This table excludes Latinos from the racial categories and assigns them to a separate category. Hispanics/Latinos may be of any race.
Race / Ethnicity (NH = Non-Hispanic)	Pop 1990	Pop 2000	Pop 2010	Pop 2020	% 1990	% 2000	% 2010	% 2020
White alone (NH)	6,666	4,222	6,871	5,331	71.28%	59.27%	69.28%	56.31%
Black or African American alone (NH)	1,493	1,315	1,575	1,762	15.96%	18.46%	15.88%	18.61%
Native American or Alaska Native alone (NH)	43	48	49	12	0.46%	0.67%	0.49%	0.13%
Asian alone (NH)	233	250	175	362	2.49%	3.51%	1.76%	3.82%
Native Hawaiian or Pacific Islander alone (NH)	x	22	150	12	x	0.31%	1.51%	0.13%
Other race alone (NH)	8	23	256	133	0.09%	0.32%	2.58%	1.40%
Mixed race or Multiracial (NH)	x	262	73	295	x	3.68%	0.74%	3.12%
Hispanic or Latino (any race)	909	981	769	1,560	9.72%	13.77%	7.75%	16.48%
Total	9,352	7,123	9,918	9,467	100.00%	100.00%	100.00%	100.00%

=== 2000 census ===
As of the census of 2000, there were 7,123 people, 174 households, and 152 families residing on the base. The population density was 642.6 people/km^{2} (1,664 people/mi^{2}). There were 412 housing units at an average density of 37.2 units/km^{2} (96 units/mi^{2}). The racial makeup of the town was 65.20% White, 19.01% Black or African American, 0.86% Native American, 3.64% Asian, 0.32% Pacific Islander, 2.20% from other races, and 8.77% from two or more races. 13.77% of the population were Hispanic or Latino of any race.

There were 174 households, out of which 79.9% had children under the age of 18 living with them, 73.0% were married couples living together, 9.2% had a female householder with no husband present, and 12.6% were non-families. 12.1% of all households were made up of individuals. The average household size was 3.49 and the average family size was 3.78.

On the base the population was spread out, with 5.3% under the age of 18, 79.8% from 18 to 24, 14.5% from 25 to 44, 0.4% from 45 to 64, and none who were 65 years of age or older. The median age was 20 years. For every 100 females, there were 256 males. For every 100 females age 18 and over, there were 267.3 males.

The median income for a household in the base was $32,250, and the median income for a family was $31,923. Males had a median income of $16,435 versus $15,572 for females. The per capita income for the base was $10,048. 7.3% of the population and 6.9% of families were below the poverty line. Out of the total population, 7.3% of those under the age of 18 were living below the poverty line.

== See also ==
- 433rd Security Forces Squadron
- Texas Cryptology Center
- Texas World War II Army Airfields
- Air Training Command
- List of airports in Texas
- Twenty-Fourth Air Force
- United States general surveillance radar stations
