= 433rd Security Forces Squadron =

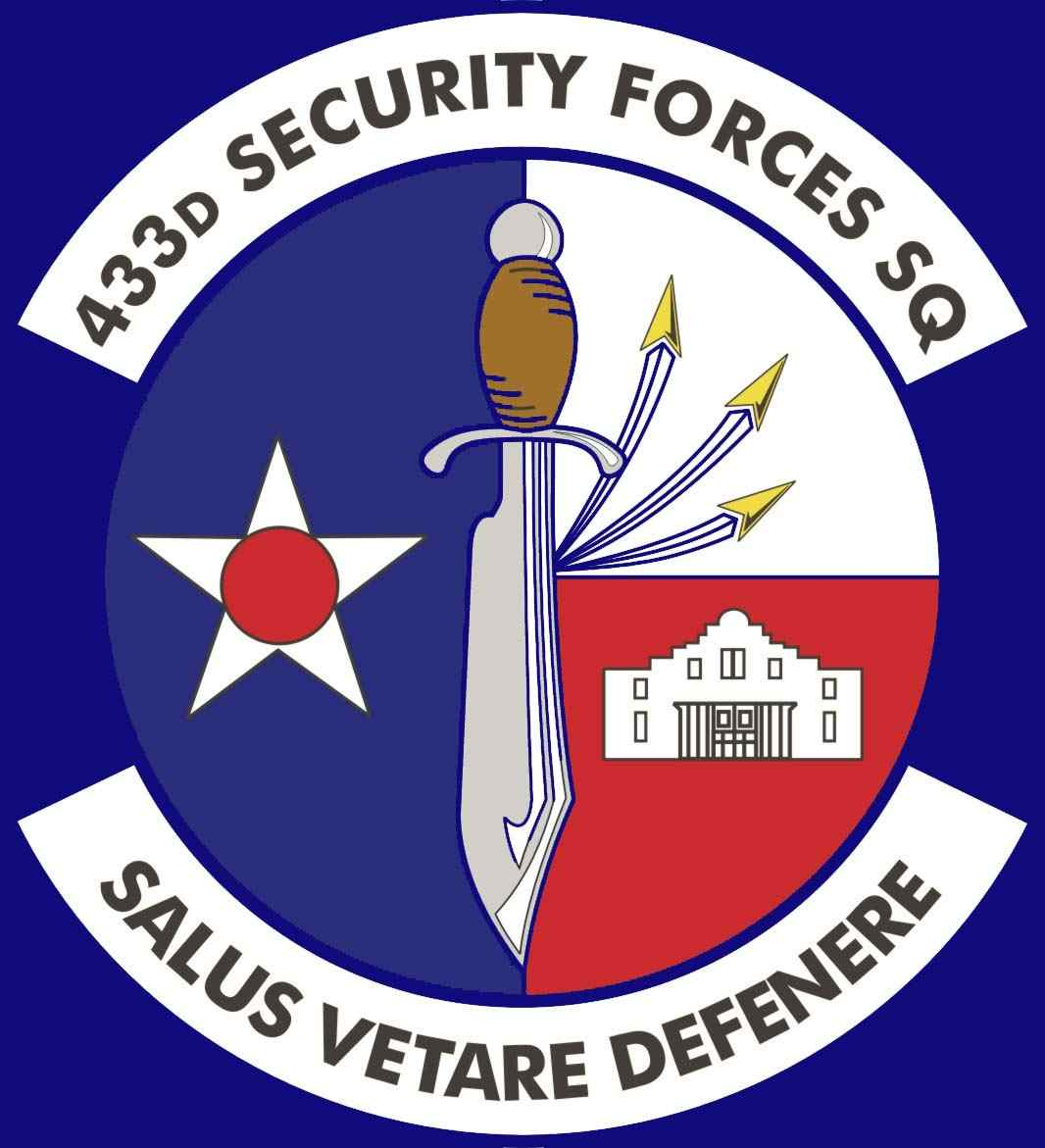
- Emblem of the 433rd Security Forces Squadron
- Active: As 433 SFS (1995 – present)
- Branch: United States Air Force
- Type: Military police
- Role: Air base defense
- Motto(s): Defensor Fortis

Commanders
- Current commander: Major Korinne D. Sharp

Insignia
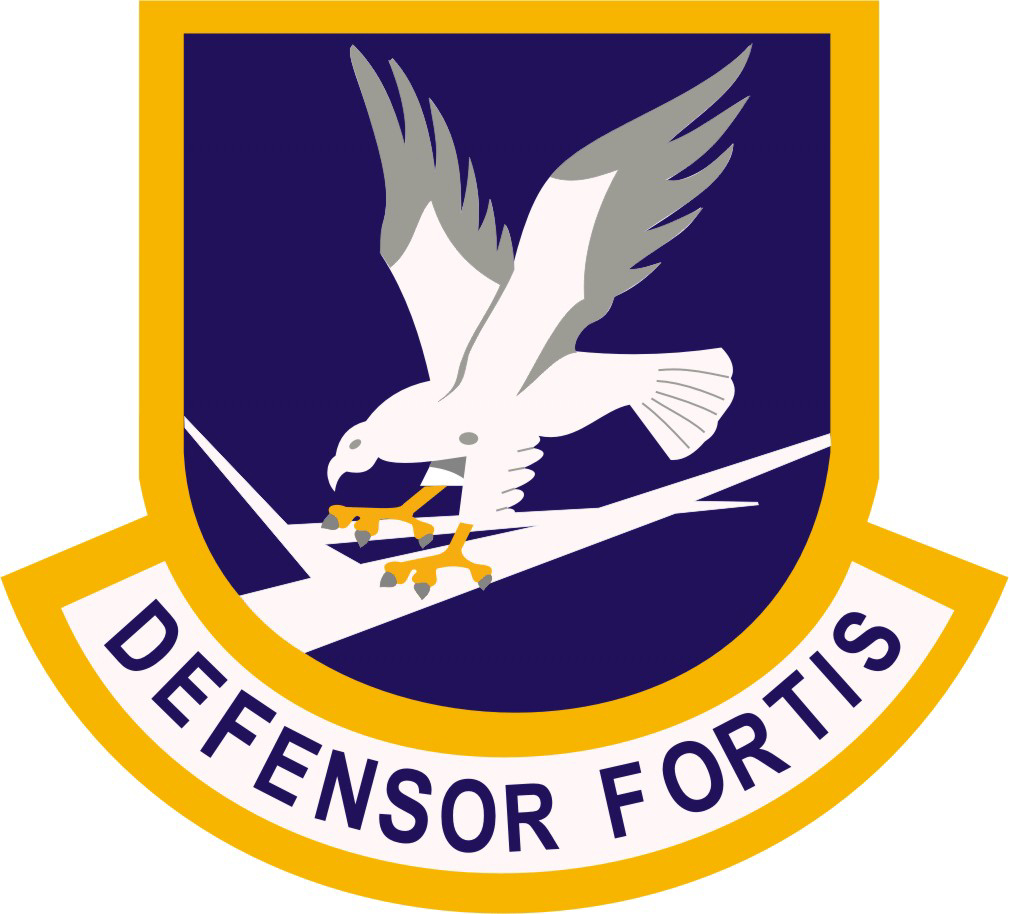
- Beret Flash

- Occupation Badge

The 433rd Security Forces Squadron (433 SFS) is a United States Air Force Reserve unit located at Lackland AFB. The unit serves a law enforcement purpose, as well as focusing on combat readiness.

The 433 SFS is assigned to the 433d Airlift Wing, the "Alamo Wing". As a unit, airmen participate in monthly unit training assemblies and annual tours. 433 SFS airmen have deployed numerous times in support of Operation Enduring Freedom and Operation Iraqi Freedom.

== Mission ==
To protect deployed weapons systems against sabotage and enlarge a base defense force.

The unit will also provide force protection for such deployed locations as a Main Operating Base, Standy Base, Limited Base, Co-located Operating Base or Bare Base; and operate in a joint service environment to include host nation forces at all levels of conflict to include military operations other than war.
