= Fowler Commission =

The Fowler Commission was a seven-member congressionally mandated panel charged with investigating charges concerning the United States Air Force Academy's sexual assault reports . The commission was created pursuant to Pub. L. 108–11 (text) (PDF) and was chaired by former Florida Congresswoman Tillie K. Fowler (R). The three-month investigation included members appointed by Department of Defense Secretary Donald Rumsfeld. The task of the committee was to review academy policies, reveal the crimes committed, and the punishment of the assailants. Several recommendations were made after the findings of the commission were published.
