= Military Justice Improvement Act =

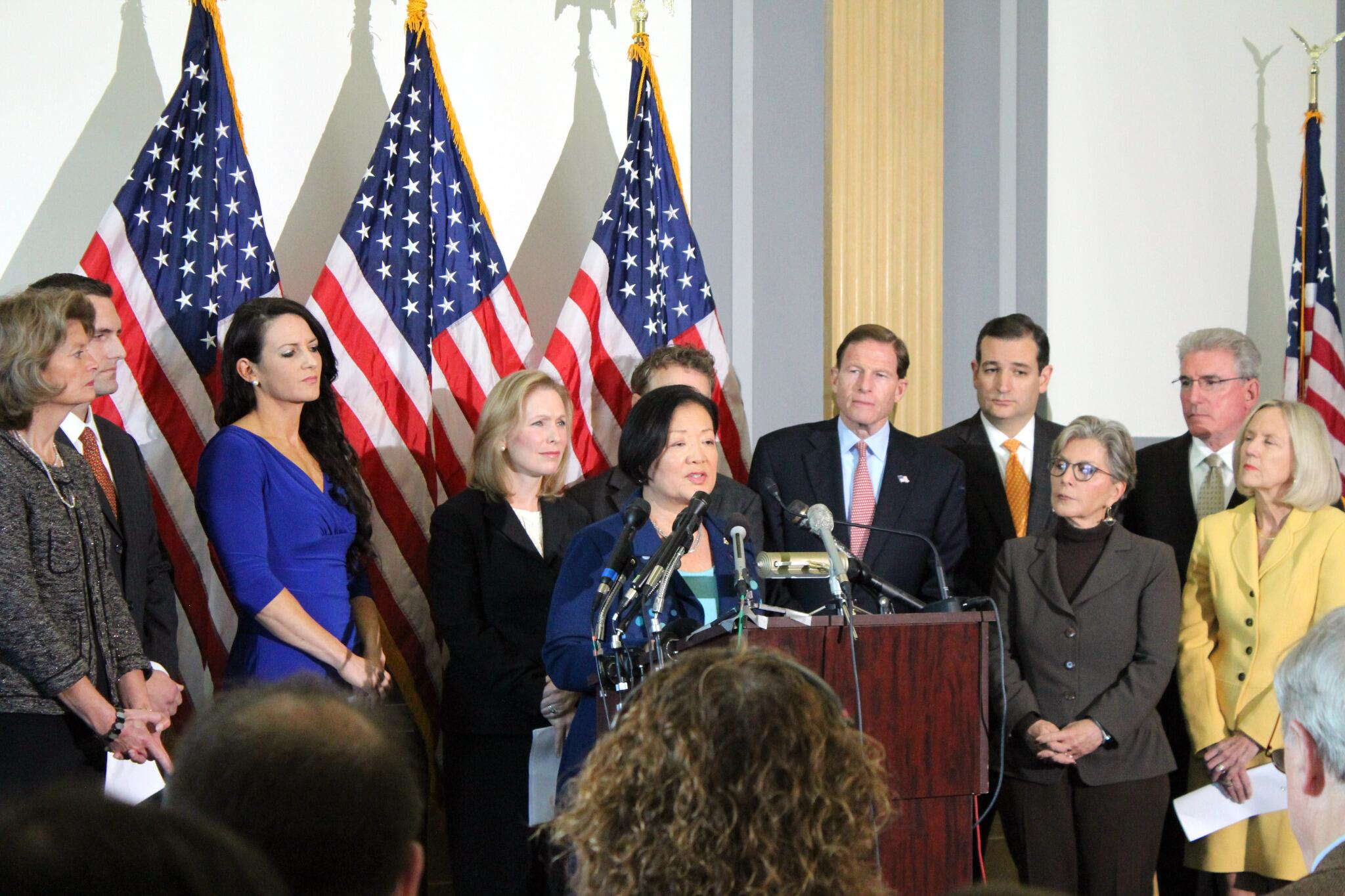
Senator Mazie Hirono speaking at a press conference, alongside fellow senators, in support of MJIA in 2012.

Senate Bill 1752, more commonly known as the Military Justice Improvement Act (MJIA), was introduced by U.S. Senator Kirsten Gillibrand (D-N.Y.) in 2013 as an attempt to reform procedures for determinations to proceed to trial by court-martial for certain offenses under the Uniform Code of Military Justice and for other purposes. The focus of the bill is to address the way that sexual assault in the United States military is handled through the military justice system and the chain of command. A similar bill that keeps Commanders in charge has been championed by Senator Claire McCaskill, D-Missouri.

Although Senator Gillibrand has been working (with bi-partisan support) to get this bill passed since 2014, it continues to be stalled in the Senate. In 2019, it was not even allowed on the floor to be debated. As of July 2020, Gillibrand has stated they will offer this bill attached to the NDAA for 2021.

Many of the core reforms championed by the bill — particularly the transfer of prosecutorial authority for serious crimes (e.g., sexual assault, murder) from commanding officers to independent, trained military prosecutors — were implemented through amendments in the National Defense Authorization Acts, most notably the FY2023 NDAA. This legislation removed remaining judicial and prosecutorial powers from commanders for covered offenses and moved them to specialized prosecutors.

So, while this bill has yet to be passed, elements of it are already being implemented as of late 2023, whereas independent lawyers have begun to prosecute cases of SA and other crimes in the US military.
