= The Invisible War =

- Promotional poster
- Directed by: Kirby Dick
- Written by: Kirby Dick
- Produced by: Amy Ziering; Tanner King Barklow
- Cinematography: Thaddeus Wadleigh; Kirsten Johnson
- Edited by: Douglas Blush; Derek Boonstra
- Production companies: Chain Camera Pictures; Independent Lens; Rise Films; ITVS; Fork Films; Cuomo Cole Productions
- Distributed by: Cinedigm; Docurama Films
- Release dates: January 20, 2012 (Sundance Film Festival); June 22, 2012 (United States)
- Running time: 97 minutes
- Country: United States
- Language: English
- Box office: $71,968

The Invisible War is a 2012 American documentary film written and directed by Kirby Dick and produced by Amy Ziering and Tanner King Barklow about sexual assault in the United States military. It premiered at the 2012 Sundance Film Festival, where it received the U.S. Documentary Audience Award. The film has been lauded by advocates, lawmakers, and journalists for its influence on government policies to reduce the prevalence of rape in the armed forces.

The Invisible War is the recipient of a Peabody Award and Emmy Awards for Best Documentary Feature and Outstanding Investigative Journalism. It was nominated for Best Documentary Feature at the 85th Academy Awards.

== Background ==
In 2010, 108,121 veterans screened positive for military sexual trauma, and 68,379 had at least one Veterans Health Administration outpatient visit for related conditions. Also in 2010, The Department of Defense processed reports of 3,198 new assaults but estimated the actual number of assaults to be closer to 19,000. However, these reports resulted in convictions against only 244 perpetrators.

== Synopsis ==
The Invisible War features interviews with veterans from multiple branches of the United States Armed Forces who recount the events surrounding their assaults. Their stories show many common themes, such as the lack of recourse to an impartial justice system, reprisals against survivors instead of against perpetrators, the absence of adequate emotional and physical care for survivors, the unhindered advancement of perpetrators' careers, and the forced expulsion of survivors from service.

Interspersed with these first person testimonies are interviews with advocates, journalists, mental health professionals, active duty and retired generals, Department of Defense officials, and members of the military justice system. The film also includes footage, often shot by the veterans themselves, which documents their lives and continuing struggles in the aftermath of their assaults.

In the film's most prominent narrative, Coast Guard veteran Seaman Kori Cioca struggles to earn benefits from the Department of Veterans Affairs to pay for the many medical difficulties that have resulted from her rape. With the help of attorney Susan L. Burke, Cioca, along with other survivors featured in the film, brings Cioca v. Rumsfeld, a civil suit against the Department of Defense alleging a failure to adequately address sexual assault within the military.

Other past incidents of sexual abuse recounted in the film include the 1991 Navy Tailhook scandal, the 1996 Army Aberdeen scandal, and the 2003 Air Force Academy scandal. The Invisible War uses these examples to argue that the military has consistently made empty promises to address its high rate of sexual assault. These stories culminate with an examination of the previously unreported culture of sexual harassment and sexual assault at the prestigious Marine Barracks Washington.

The survivors and advocates featured in the film call for changes to the way the military handles sexual assault, such as shifting prosecution away from unit commanders, who often are either friends with assailants or are assailants themselves.

== Interviews ==
People interviewed in The Invisible War include:

=== Members of Congress ===
- Chellie Pingree, (D, Maine)
- Louise Slaughter (D, New York)
- Mike Turner (R, Ohio)
- Loretta Sanchez (D, California)
- Jackie Speier (D, California)
- Ted Poe (R, Texas)
- Susan Davis, (D, California)
- Niki Tsongas, (D, Massachusetts)

=== Military personnel ===
- Major General Mary Kay Hertog, director, Sexual Assault Prevention and Response Office
- Dr. Kaye Whitley, former director, Sexual Assault Prevention and Response Office
- Rear Admiral Anthony Kurta, director, Military Plans and Policy
- General Claudia J. Kennedy, US Army (retired)
- Brigadier General Wilma L. Vaught, US Air Force (retired)
- Brigadier General Loree Sutton, M.D., US Army (retired)
- Major General Dennis Laich, US Army (retired)
- Staff Sergeant Stace Nelson, NCIS Special Agent, USMC (retired)
- Veteran Robinlynne Mabin-Lafayette, USAF Disabled Veteran

== Response ==
Following its release, The Invisible War was heralded for exposing a culture of widespread sexual harassment and sexual assault at Marine Barracks Washington. In March 2012, eight women, including two who appeared in the film, filed suit against military leaders for maintaining an environment that tolerates rapists while silencing survivors.

Secretary of Defense Leon Panetta viewed the film on April 14, 2012. On April 16, 2012, Secretary Panetta issued a directive ordering all sexual assault cases to be handled by senior officers at the rank of colonel or higher, which effectively ended the practice of commanders adjudicating these cases from within their own units. In his 2014 memoir Worthy Fights, Panetta states that watching The Invisible War was one of the main factors that influenced him to take action on the issue of sexual assault in the military.

On June 25, 2012, the Marine Corps unveiled a new plan to combat sexual assault. Marine Corps Commandant General James F. Amos met with all non-deployed Marine generals to review the new procedures, which seek to discourage unsafe environments while increasing reporting. In November 2012 Air Force Chief of Staff General Mark Welsh met with all active wing commanders to screen the film and discuss the problem of rape in the military. The film's distributor estimates that 235,000 service members viewed The Invisible War in 2012.

On January 4, 2013, President Barack Obama signed the National Defense Authorization Act for Fiscal Year 2013. This law included many improvements to the military's handling of sexual assault cases, such as barring individuals with felony sex abuse convictions from receiving enlistment waivers, forming special victims units to investigate and prosecute sexual assault cases, and installing new policies to prevent professional retaliation against assault survivors.

According to The New York Times, the film "has been credited with both persuading more women to come forward to report abuse and with forcing the military to deal more openly with the problem." The Times also notes that the film helped spur the House Armed Services Committee to hold a January 23, 2013, hearing on sexual assault in the military. During the hearing, Rep. Mike Turner acknowledged the film for illustrating the hostility faced by many survivors who speak up or seek help. The Invisible War was again discussed during a Senate subcommittee hearing on March 13, 2013, in which lawmakers and military officials described the film's impact on military training programs dealing with sexual assault.

Senator Kirsten Gillibrand credits The Invisible War with inspiring her to create legislation to reduce sexual assault in the military. In her 2014 memoir Off the Sidelines, Gillibrand writes, "Nothing in my life...prepared me for what I saw in that film.... Whatever it took, I had to help bring justice to these survivors, and I needed to work to prevent future crimes." In November 2013, Gillibrand introduced the Military Justice Improvement Act, which would require military sexual assault cases to be handled by an independent judiciary body. In March 2014 the bill failed to secure enough votes to break a filibuster.

== Reception ==
The Invisible War received widespread acclaim from critics. The Invisible War has an approval rating of 99% on review aggregator website Rotten Tomatoes, based on 72 reviews, and an average rating of 8.20/10. The website's critical consensus states, "The Invisible War is a vital and frank expose on sexual assault in the U.S. military, shot by master filmmaker Kirby Dick (This Film is Not Yet Rated)". It also has a score of 75 out of 100 on Metacritic, based on 19 critics, indicating "generally favorable reviews". At the end of 2012, it held a 100% Fresh rating from review aggregator Rotten Tomatoes, which also listed it as the #1 film of the year.

The film appeared on numerous year-end best lists, including in The New York Times, Time, and the National Board of Review. The Chicago Film Critics Association named it the Best Documentary of 2012.

The Christian Science Monitor's Peter Rainer observed that the film broke new ground, as it "was the first to really explore the issue of rape in the military" and that "the fact that this subject has taken so long to achieve full-scale exposure was itself symptomatic of the problem." He selected it as one of the top ten films of the year.

The Boston Globe's Christopher Wallenberg noted that The Invisible War "achieved a rare feat for a documentary by breaking a national news story: The alleged coverup of incidents of sexual assault and harassment at the prestigious Marine Barracks Washington." Other critics also focused on the film's investigative journalism, including A. O. Scott, who wrote in The New York Times that Dick is "one of the indispensable muckrakers of American cinema, zeroing in on frequently painful stories about how power functions in the absence or failure of accountability."

Jonathan Hahn of the Los Angeles Review of Books wrote, "There are some works of writing or painting, speech, or film that do more than just stand as great works of art. They change things. They put before us something fundamentally wrong with the world — with the society we take for granted, with the institutions on which we depend and that in turn depend on us — and demand change. The Invisible War belongs in that pantheon, and is easily one of the most important films of the year."

Two survivors and one service provider who appear in The Invisible War criticized the filmmakers for their fleeting focus on male victims. Director Kirby Dick responded, saying that he is empathetic toward their concerns, but felt that focusing on women would serve as the best "entry point" for the discussion.

== Awards and nominations ==
Year	Award	Category	Nominee(s)	Result
2012	Sundance Film Festival	Audience Award for Best Documentary	Kirby Dick	Won
2012	Human Rights Watch Film Festival	Nestor Almendros Award for Courage in Filmmaking		Won
2012	Dallas International Film Festival	Silver Heart Humanitarian Award		Won
2012	Seattle International Film Festival	Audience Award for Best Documentary	Kirby Dick	Won
2012	Provincetown International Film Festival	Audience Award for Best Documentary Feature	Kirby Dick	Won
2012	DocuWest International Documentary Film Festival	Best of Festival		Won
2012	Peace Over Violence Awards	Award for Advocacy		Won
2012	International Documentary Association	Best Feature	Kirby Dick	Nominated
2013	Independent Spirit Awards	Best Documentary	Kirby Dick, Tanner King Barklow, Amy Ziering	Won
2013	WGA Awards	Best Documentary Screenplay	Kirby Dick	Nominated
2013	Academy Awards	Best Documentary Feature	Kirby Dick, Amy Ziering	Nominated
2013	DGA Awards	Documentary Directing	Kirby Dick	Nominated
2013	Ridenhour Prize	Documentary Film		Won
2013	Peabody Awards			Won
2013	Impact Awards	Jury Special Commendation		Won
2014	Emmy Awards	Best Documentary Feature		Won
2014	Emmy Awards	Outstanding Investigative Journalism – Long Form		Won
