= Intimate partner violence and U.S. military populations =

Intimate partner violence (IPV) is defined as physical and sexual violence or threat of violence, intimidation, or coercion that occurs between past or current intimate partners. Perpetrators of violence may use coercion tactics to keep the partner in the home. These tactics could include threatening harm to a family pet or threatening to take custody of children if the partner attempts to leave. IPV is a serious public health concern in the United States and one that has the potential to affect an individual’s medical readiness. Within the military community, intimate relationships may be particularly vulnerable to occupation-stress that is specific to military operations. These demands might include frequent moves to undesirable locations or overseas, separation from extended family for unknown lengths of time, frequent variability in work schedule, long hours, career uncertainty, mission ambiguity, training environments meant to simulate varying operational environments, and risk that is inherent to the field. Although there are programs in place designed to support the family unit (i.e., Family Readiness Group (FRG), Family Advocacy Program (FAP)), the stress of multiple deployments, combat exposure, and exposure to traumatic events (i.e., combat, IED, mortar rounds, witnessing death or atrocities) cause additional strain on the family unit as service members reintegrate into the home environment following the return home from a deployment. Deployments bring additional stress on the family unit as two-parent homes transition to one-parent homes while attempting to maintain their semi-regular schedules.

== 2018 discrimination case ==
In 2018, a discrimination scandal involving employees at the Family Advocacy Program in Pearl Harbor, Hawaii led military officials to re-evaluate how caseworkers treated male victims. An investigation found that FAP caseworkers did not follow DoD policies, refused to provide services for male victims, purposefully withheld evidence of a woman committing child abuse and domestic violence, and did not record when male victims requested help.

The case was written about in the Honolulu Civil Beat: https://www.civilbeat.org/2021/01/a-bitter-domestic-dispute-could-shake-up-how-the-navy-handles-abuse-cases-in-hawaii/

As of February 2021, the case has yet to be finalized and is pending further review. This has prompted the writing of the “Military Anti-Discrimination Act.” The bill is meant to allow service members to file claims against the military for cases of discrimination. It is currently being considered by lawmakers and does not have a sponsor.

== Theories of IPV ==
There are several theories that attempt to explain the use of force within an intimate relationship. Cultural spill-over effect posits that the more a culture supports the use of violence to achieve their objectives, the more likely individuals in that culture will legitimize violence and generalize those beliefs across multiple domains, which include those where the use of violence or aggression is not socially appropriate. Occupational stress spill-over theory posits that male-dominated, hypermasculine occupations may inadvertently emphasize control though the use of physical force, which generalizes across domains where the use of force is socially unacceptable.

=== Types and severity ===
The Department of Defense (DoD) Defense Task Force on Domestic Violence categorizes violence severity into three categories: severe, moderate, and mild. The behaviors categorized under each level of severity are relatively similar between branches of service. Severe physical abuse is defined as choking or strangulation, any injury during sustained while pregnant, threat of harm with a knife or firearm, emotional abuse and intimidation (i.e., “battered spouse syndrome”), sexual abuse, and major physical injuries that require long-term medical treatment such as inpatient care. Moderate abuse includes objects thrown at spouse, physical abuse (i.e., pushing, biting, kicking, hitting shoving, or punching) and injuries that require short-term medical treatment (i.e., one visit to the hospital). Mild abuse involves verbal threats and physical injuries that don’t require medical treatment.

== Prevalence ==
The prevalence rates of IPV across military populations ranges from 13.5–58% with lower rates observed in military samples not selected based on psychopathology. In 2001, over 18,000 incidents of abuse were reported to the DoD Family Advocacy Programs. Of those incidents reported, 84% involved physical abuse, 66% of victims were spouses of military community and less than 25-years-old. From 1995–2001, there were 217 domestic homicides in military communities. Physical abuse is more likely to be reported than psychological abuse (i.e., emotional and verbal abuse.) Children exposed to IPV may exhibit more behavioral problems, lower performance in school, and aggressive behavior across multiple settings than those not exposed to violence in the home. IPV perpetration among veteran populations with posttraumatic stress disorder (PTSD) is up to three times higher than those without PTSD.

== Analysis of violence ==
Violence can be further characterized by directionality. Bi-directional violence is defined as violence that is committed by both individuals in the relationship, which include violence committed in anger or retaliation. Unilateral violence is defined as violence perpetrated by one individual in the relationship and has been connected to dissociative violence, parasomnia, and hypnopompic violence (i.e., violence due to hyperarousal during sleep) in the literature.

== Risk factors ==
Research suggests that individuals experiencing psychopathology are at a greater risk of perpetration or victimization of IPV compared to veterans without a formal clinical diagnosis. Individuals who experience symptoms associated with PTSD are at a greater risk of perpetrating IPV and being victimized than civilians and veterans without PTSD symptoms. Intrusive negative thoughts, flashbacks, feelings of generalized distress, lack of connection with family or community, and hyperarousal are symptoms that have been shown to influence the relationship between combat exposure and IPV perpetration. This relationship varies with type and level of combat exposure (i.e., witnessing atrocities). History of traumatic brain injury (TBI) has been associated with higher rates of IPV perpetration. Additional risk factors include heavy alcohol and drug use, which has been shown to increase the risk of violence among couples who score high in verbal aggressive conflict communication style. Childhood trauma was found to be correlated with increased risk of violence with Air Force and Navy FAPs reporting 11–25% of service members experiencing physical or emotional abuse by a parent and 49% of treatment-mandated active duty service member samples reporting childhood abuse. Research suggests a positive correlation between length of deployment and severity of self-reported IPV following a deployment. Being junior in rank and marrying at a young age (i.e., below 25-years of age) were also identified.

== IPV protocol and programs ==
DoD Directive 6400.1, which required each branch of service to establish FAP, also required each military installation to have at least one victim advocate. The role of the victim advocate is to help individuals obtain a military protective order, collaborate with unit commanders, help prepare safety plans, connect victims to civilian resources, and provide 24-hour service availability to victims. FAP advocates, chaplains, and medical professionals must maintain the victims’ confidentiality when cases of IPV are reported by the victim, except in specific cases when confidentiality must be broken to ensure the safety of children, older adults, and vulnerable adults. Reports made to other staff (i.e., direct leadership or FRG members) are not confidential and may be reported to military law enforcement or commanders.

=== Available programs ===
There are multiple programs designed to support military families. FAP was developed to support the specific needs of military families and currently provides several programs designed to reduce IPV. These programs include new parent support, individual counseling, couples counseling, workshops, and seminars. Strength at Home-Men’s Program (SAH-M), a 12-week cognitive-behavioral and trauma-informed group intervention designed to reduce IPV, has been shown to help individuals limit psychical and psychological IPV, and improve emotional processing, which has been associated with violence.
