= Sexual Harassment/Assault Response & Prevention =

US Army program dealing with sexual harassment

SHARP is a proactive U.S. Army program which aims to end sexual harassment and assault in the service. (Note: US Army Sexual Harassment/Assault Response & Prevention Tell us how we can help: I NEED TO TALK TO SOMEONE NOW; I WAS SEXUALLY ASSAULTED; I WAS SEXUALLY HARASSED; I WANT TO HELP SOMEONE) Sexual harassment is a crime in the armed forces, under the UCMJ Article 134 by executive order on 26 January 2022. Those accused of a crime such as sexual harassment, or assault are subject to the UCMJ (or to civil statute). Victims of such crimes are protected from disciplinary action, or prosecution by Army Directive as of 2022. A Special Trial Counsel, part of the Judge Advocate General's Corps has been established to combat harmful behaviors, (Note: The crimes include "Murder, Manslaughter, Rape, Sexual Assault, Rape of a Child, Sexual Assault of a Child, Other Sexual Misconduct, Kidnapping, Domestic Violence, Stalking, Retaliation, Child Pornography and Wrongful Broadcast". A general officer has been appointed to lead Office of Special Trial Counsel.) in order to conduct independent prosecutions.

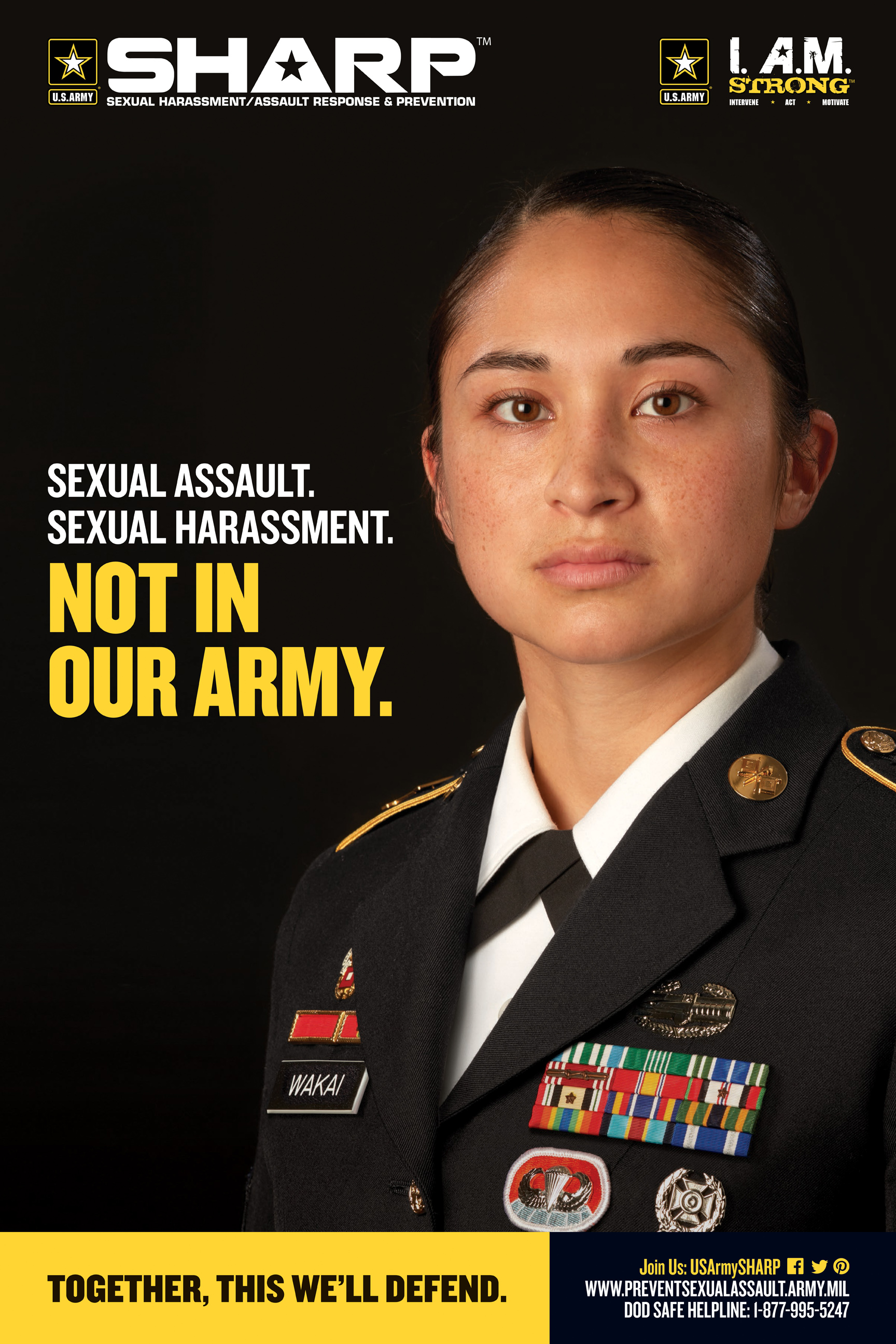
Poster created by the U.S. Army's Sexual Harassment/Assault Response & Prevention (SHARP)

SHARP has full-time staff at the brigade level and higher, and maintains a social media presence on Twitter and Facebook. See: SAPRO Since 2005, hundreds of millions of dollars have been spent on the program. The Army is redesigning this Program as of 2021. Department of the Army Civilians (DACs) are also protected under SHARP as of September 2021. Army regulation AR 600-20 details the responsibilities of the Commanders of the respective units in the event of Sexual Harassment/Assault, as well as the expected response and/or prevention steps.

In 2021, the NDAA for 2022 provided for independent prosecutors offices in each branch of the service. Legislation in 2021, had previously intended to separate the commander of an afflicted unit from the military prosecutor's role in cases alleging sexual assault. Commanders at the FORSCOM, III Corps, and §Fort Hood levels now have specific actions to complete upon a Sexual Assault Review Board complaint. CID is being restructured: a civilian director reporting directly to the secretary of the Army will oversee criminal probes; Forts Hood, Carson, and Bragg will be the first posts to implement the reorganization. The Provost Marshal and the Military Police will no longer undertake criminal investigations. A new branch like those in the Air Force and Navy for Special Agents will be instituted. FORSCOM now requires the selection of investigating officers from outside an installation's brigade-sized element, which is processing a complaint, effective 27 December 2023. A two-star general was reprimanded in 2021 for conducting a SHARP investigation internally, rather than turning the investigation over to CID. See Unlawful command influence

== Expectations for the Army ==
On 8 December 2020, the secretary of the Army announced that the SHARP program failed to meet its mandate, notably in Fort Hood's command culture and that an action plan would address its shortcomings, beginning with the suspension of 14 senior leaders. Similar incidents at Camp Casey, South Korea led to a suicide after a service member waited 82 days for a transfer to a different duty location. In December 2020, the 19th Expeditionary Sustainment Command, USFK defined a Continuum of Harm, ranging from healthy behaviors and descending through five sexual behaviors to remedy.

“Deeds, Not Words.” Pretty good guidance. Words from the secretary and chief are important, to be sure. More important will be the policies they change, and the priority and resources they assign to this challenge. Most important will be to show through their actions that leaders at every level will be held accountable._Carter F. Ham

== Inculcating Army values ==
Secretary of Defense Lloyd Austin directed every senior leader to report on their sexual assault prevention programs, with an assessment of what has worked and what hasn't, by 5 February 2021. Austin "asked for relevant data for the past decade, including efforts to support victims". Changes to the Uniform Code of Military Justice (UCMJ) are underway; Sexual Assault cases are to be removed from commanders' purview. As of 29 December 2023, by the 2022 National Defense Authorization Act, prosecution for sexual assault, and 13 other crimes are no longer in the unit commander's chain of command; rather a specially trained prosecutor in the office of special trial counsel, which is part of an O-7 judge advocate office will prosecute the case.

As of 30 July 2021, SHARP training will occur before the Initial Entry Training (IET). After this change, IET programs saw a reduction in abuse rates from 30 per month to 3 per month.

== Army G-1 study of sexual assault risk ==
An Army G-1 project to Identify Army Organizational Factors Contributing to Sexual Assault Risk has released a RAND study of August 2017 to July 2018 records of sexual assault. The 18 June 2021 study showed that the average risk of sexual assault for women was 5.8%, and for men 0.64%. The five posts for women at highest risk of sexual assault were:

1. Fort Hood, where the sexual assault risk was 8.4% in 2018
2. Fort Bliss
3. Fort Riley
4. Fort Campbell
5. Fort Carson

When RAND researchers controlled for posts of similar size and demographics, Fort Hood women were 1.7% more at risk than the cohort. Some risk factors are toxic command culture, and proximity to combat arms units.

Adjusting for other factors associated with high risk, the researchers found a completely different ranking:

- For women: Fort Drum, Fort Lewis, and Okinawa garrison were the highest risk
- For men: Fort Drum; Osan, Korea; and Italy's garrisons were the highest risk

The average risk of sexual harassment at Forts Hood, Bliss, Stewart, Riley, and Campbell was 24.4%.

=== SA/SH fusion directorates ===
A one-year pilot program for fusion of Sexual Assault and Sexual Harassment directorates was announced in October 2021. Fusion directors will aggregate individual case services to give visibility to each victim's case, by installation as previous attempts to address sexual harassment and assault in the Army have not solved the problem. Fusion directors will be available to the victims in the following locations:

1. Aberdeen Proving Ground
2. Schofield Barracks
3. Fort Bragg
4. Fort Irwin
5. Fort Riley
6. Fort Sill
7. A virtual fusion directorate for the 99th Readiness Division, US Army Reserve, Joint Base McGuire-Dix-Lakehurst.

The Fusion directors will report to the installation commanders of the respective installations, to give sexual assault and sexual harassment victims a venue outside their brigade-sized chain of command.
