= Military suicide =

Military suicide could refer to more than one concept.

- For mental health in the armed forces, see: suicide in the military
- For intentional use of suicide by militaries and militant groups, see: suicide attack

== See also ==
- Deaths at Deepcut army barracks, UK
- Dedovshchina – Hazing and abuse in the Russian army
- Martyr – Person who suffers persecution
- Military saint – Patron saints associated with the military
- Suicide in the Turkish Armed Forces
- Sexual harassment in the military
- United States military veteran suicide
