= General Cochrane =

General Cochrane may refer to:

- Dave Cochrane (Canadian Forces officer) (fl. 1980s–2020s), Royal Canadian Air Force brigadier general
- Henry Clay Cochrane (1842–1913), U.S. Marine Corps brigadier general
- James Kilvington Cochrane (1873–1948), British Army brigadier general
- John Cochrane (politician) (1813–1898), Union Army brigadier general
- Douglas Cochrane, 12th Earl of Dundonald (1852–1935), British Army lieutenant general

== See also ==
- John Cochran (physician) (1730–1807), U.S. Army Surgeon General in the American Revolution
- William Burr Cochran (1863–1931), U.S. Army brigadier general
- Attorney General Cochrane (disambiguation)
