= Sexual misconduct in the British military =

Sexual harassment and assault in the UK armed forces

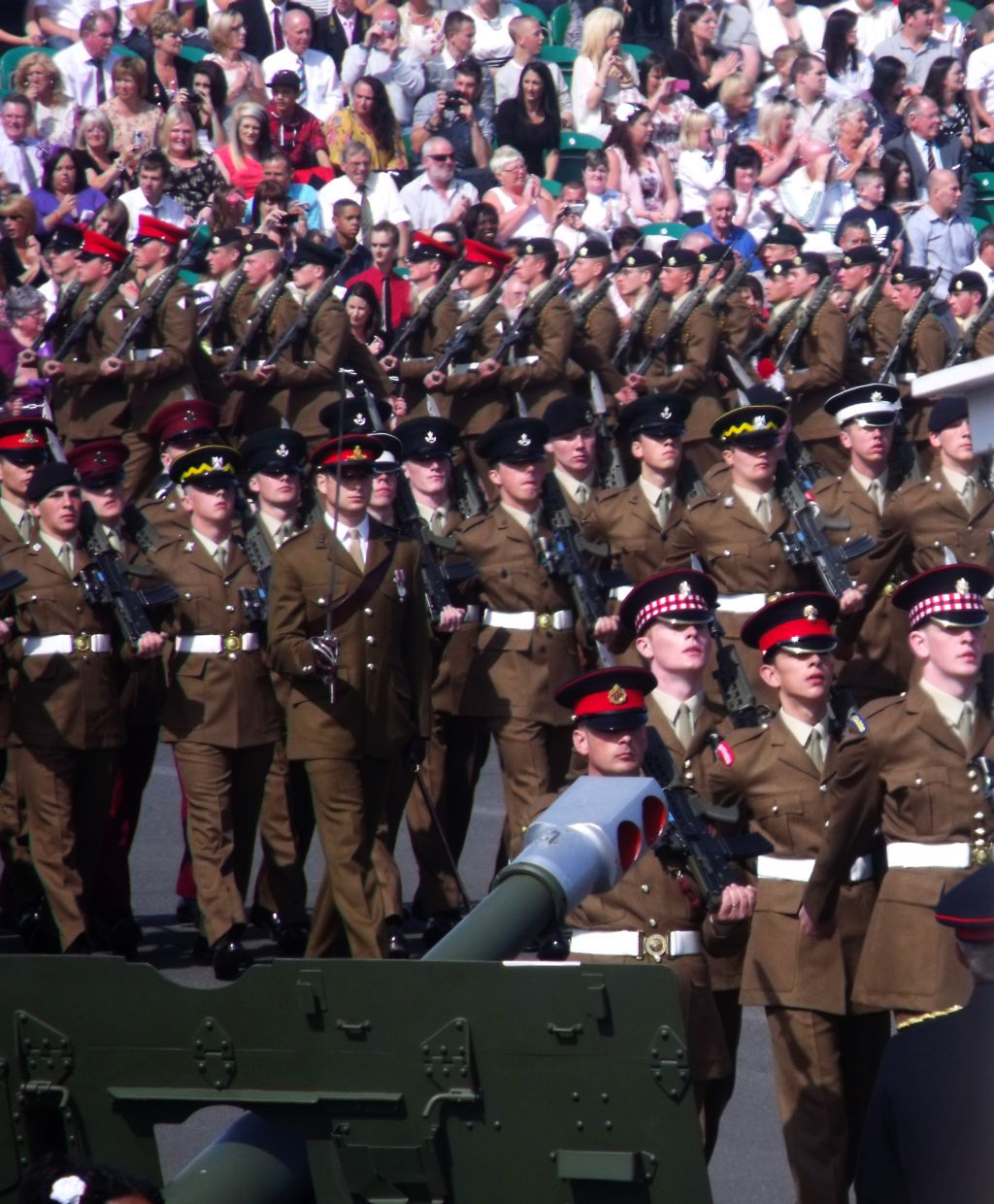
Army Foundation College, Harrogate, site of 22 recorded sexual offences against teenage recruits in 2021.

Sexual misconduct in the British military is unwanted sexual behaviour occurring in military organisations of the United Kingdom, including verbal and physical harassment, assault, and rape.

As of 2021, official surveys indicate that between 15% and 25% of British armed forces personnel experience sexual harassment at least once per year.

The experience of 'particularly upsetting' incidents is more common among women, particularly in the army, where 35% of female soldiers said in 2021 they had had such an experience in the previous 12 months.

Women targeted tend to be young and of low rank. In 2021, 22 trainees at the Army Foundation College for recruits aged 16–17 were victims of recorded sexual offences. In the same year, 37 girls aged under 18 across the armed forces were victims of sexual offences.

Other groups at high risk include members of local cadet forces, the intimate partners of personnel, and wartime detainees. The large majority of perpetrators are men.

Risk factors typical of military settings include the young age of personnel, the minority status of women, hierarchical power relationships, the predominance of traditionally masculine values and behaviours, and a heavy drinking culture.

Prevalent harassment in the UK armed forces specifically has been associated with a culture that demeans women and other marginalised social groups, and with senior leaders who engage in misconduct themselves or fail to challenge it in others.

The rates of formal complaint are low, largely due to distrust in the chain of command. The conviction rate for serious sexual offences in the military justice system is also markedly lower than that in the civilian system.

Traumatic sexual misconduct has been found to increase the risk of stress-related mental health problems including post-traumatic stress disorder (PTSD).

== Context ==
Sexual misconduct, including harassment and assault, is a pervasive problem in militaries worldwide. It affects women disproportionately, particularly younger women and girls. Other groups at high risk include partners of personnel, child cadets, and military detainees.

While prevalence varies by country, military branch, and other factors, official statistics and peer-reviewed studies from Canada, France, the UK, and the US indicate that between a quarter and a third of military women in these countries are sexually harassed at work at least once each year.

Military training settings are characterised by a particularly high level of sexual harassment and assault relative to both the civilian population and other military settings. Research further shows an increase in perpetration during and after deployment on military operations.

== Definitions ==
Following the Equality Act 2010, sexual harassment is defined by the British armed forces as 'unwanted conduct of a sexual nature that has the purpose or effect of violating someone's dignity, or creating an intimidating, hostile, degrading, humiliating or offensive environment for them'.

Such misconduct includes generalised, untargeted behaviours, such as jokes about rape, as well as behaviours focused on individuals, such as unwanted touching, sexual coercion, assault, and rape.

== Examples ==
'A friend was out on an exercise when a group of men ducked her head in a bucket of water and each time she came up for breath she had to repeat "I am useless and I am a female". She told the story and said it was a joke but I could see she was upset.' Female soldier, 2006.

'The lads just get drunk and go down the corridors trying to open any doors that are unlocked. The Chain of Command blame it on the individual saying they should just lock their door.' Female soldier, 2020.

'I have experienced an overwhelming culture of covering up/denying incidents of harassment... Many of the women I have served with have opted to leave/become medically downgraded as a consequence of their treatment.' Female submariner, 2021

'K reported a rape... Her assailant was charged. She described being ostracised and bullied within her unit following her formal report. Her chain of command made her the subject of an individual order restricting her ability to socialise with males (as far as she knows, no similar orders were made against males in her unit). She was in due course severely punished for a brief breach of the order.' Case description, 2021.

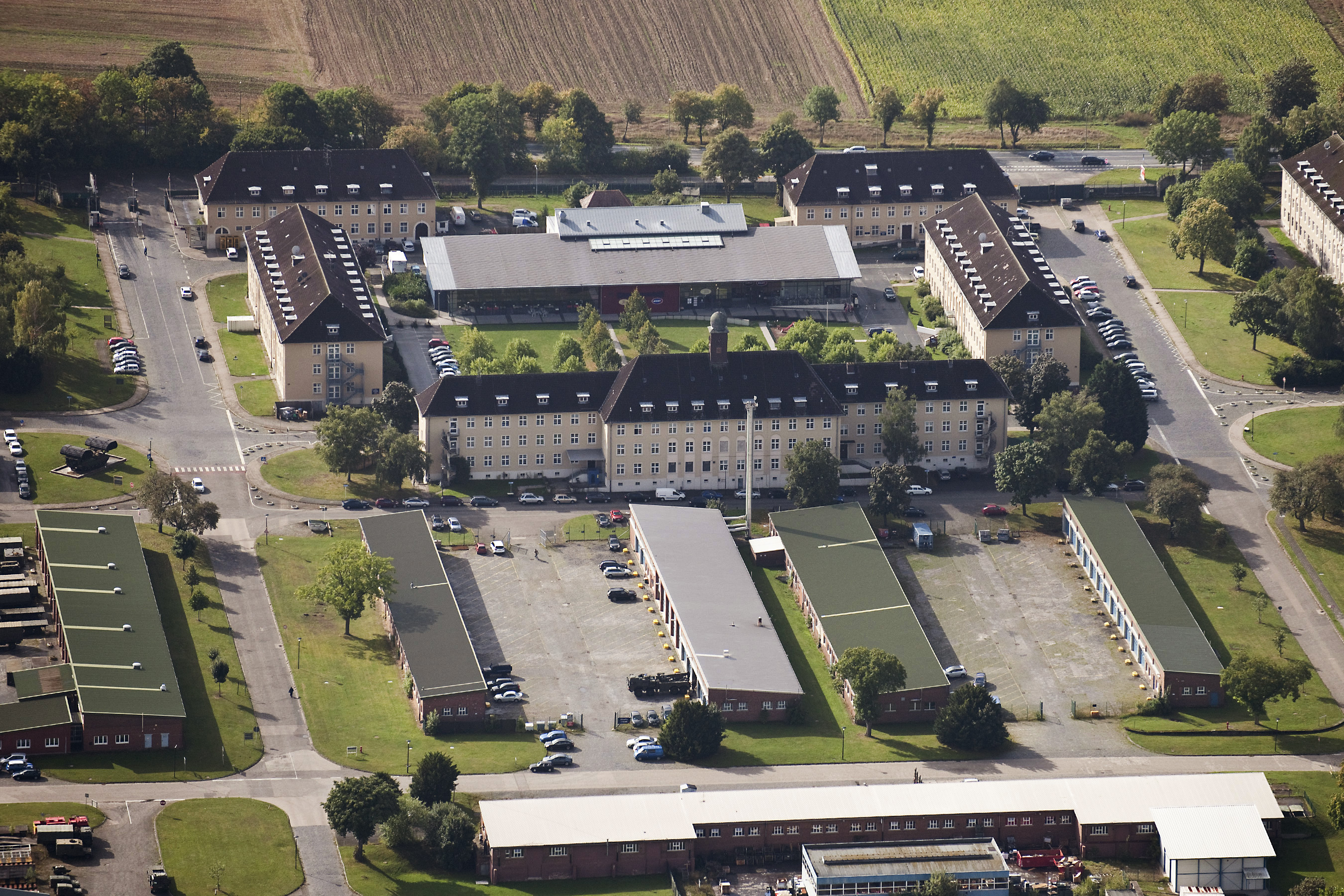
British army base at Sennelager, Germany, where Cpl Anne-Marie Ellement reported that two of her colleagues had raped her in 2009.

After army Corporal Anne-Marie Ellement reported that she had been raped by two colleagues at her base in Germany in 2009, the coroner found that the bullying she received afterwards materially contributed to her decision to end her life two years later. As reported in The Guardian, the coroner concluded that the rape and the army's subsequent inaction had 'deeply and permanently affected' Ellement, and that the bullying she experienced afterwards was a factor in her decision to end her life.

== Impact ==
The experience of being targeted by sexual misconduct is typically traumatic. Canadian and US research has found that it increases the risk of stress-related mental illness, particularly post-traumatic stress disorder (PTSD).

Research in the US found that when sexual abuse of female military personnel was psychiatrically traumatic, the odds of suffering from PTSD after deployment on operations increased by a factor of nine.

US research also found that personnel affected by sexual harassment were somewhat less likely to develop depression or PTSD if a formal report led to effective action to address the issue.

== Risk factors ==
Risk factors typical of military settings include the young average age of personnel, isolated workplaces, the minority status of women, hierarchical power relationships, a culture of conformity, the predominance of traditionally masculine values and behaviours, and a heavy drinking culture.

Sexual misconduct is typically accompanied by a wider culture that demeans women and other marginalised social groups in the military, such as LGBTQ+ people and people of colour, as inferior to white heterosexual men. The first systematic survey of sexual harassment in the British armed forces, in 2006, found that a male-dominated culture both sexualised women and undervalued their military competence. Among the comments made to researchers by male personnel about their female counterparts were: 'Ok there are a few exceptions but on the whole they [women] shouldn't be here.'; 'They're all lesbians or sluts.'; and 'They are emotionally unstable.'

== Prevalence ==
=== All personnel ===
Since 2006, periodic, anonymised surveys have been published by each military branch. In 2021, the survey found that the following proportions of personnel, irrespective of age and gender, had had a 'particularly upsetting' experience of sexual harassment in the previous 12 months:

- Army: 15%.
- Royal Navy/Royal Marines: 25%.
- Royal Air Force: 'A quarter' (no percentage given).

=== Female personnel ===
While men are victimised by sexual misconduct, women are much more frequently targeted. Since 2009, official surveys have found the proportion of women affected has been rising, as indicated in the following table.

Proportion of British army women targeted by sexual harassment in previous 12 months (2009-2021, by year) Note: Categories are not mutually exclusive.
	'Particularly upsetting' experience of sexual harassment	Attempted or actual serious sexual assault	Rape
2009	8%	3%	Not asked
2015	13%	2%	Not asked
2018	15%	2%	1%
2021	35%	5%	1.8%

=== Younger women and girls ===
The official surveys reveal that women of low rank, who also tend to be younger than other personnel and more recently recruited, are disproportionately targeted for harassment, particularly in the army. In 2018, for example, 5% of low-ranking women in the army said they had been treated badly for refusing to have sex with someone, versus 1% of senior female officers. In 2021, half of recorded rape offences (22 of 44) were in the army and just under two-thirds (27) concerned personnel at the lowest rank of Private or equivalent.

The risk faced by girls aged under 18 is particularly high. In 2021, girls were ten times as likely as adult female personnel to be the victim of a sexual offence. In the same year, 37 girls across the British armed forces (from a total population at the time of 290) were victims of a sexual offence; in four cases the offence was rape. 22 new recruits at the training centre for the youngest soldier trainees, the Army Foundation College were victims of sexual offences that year; three of the accused were members of staff.

=== Cadets ===
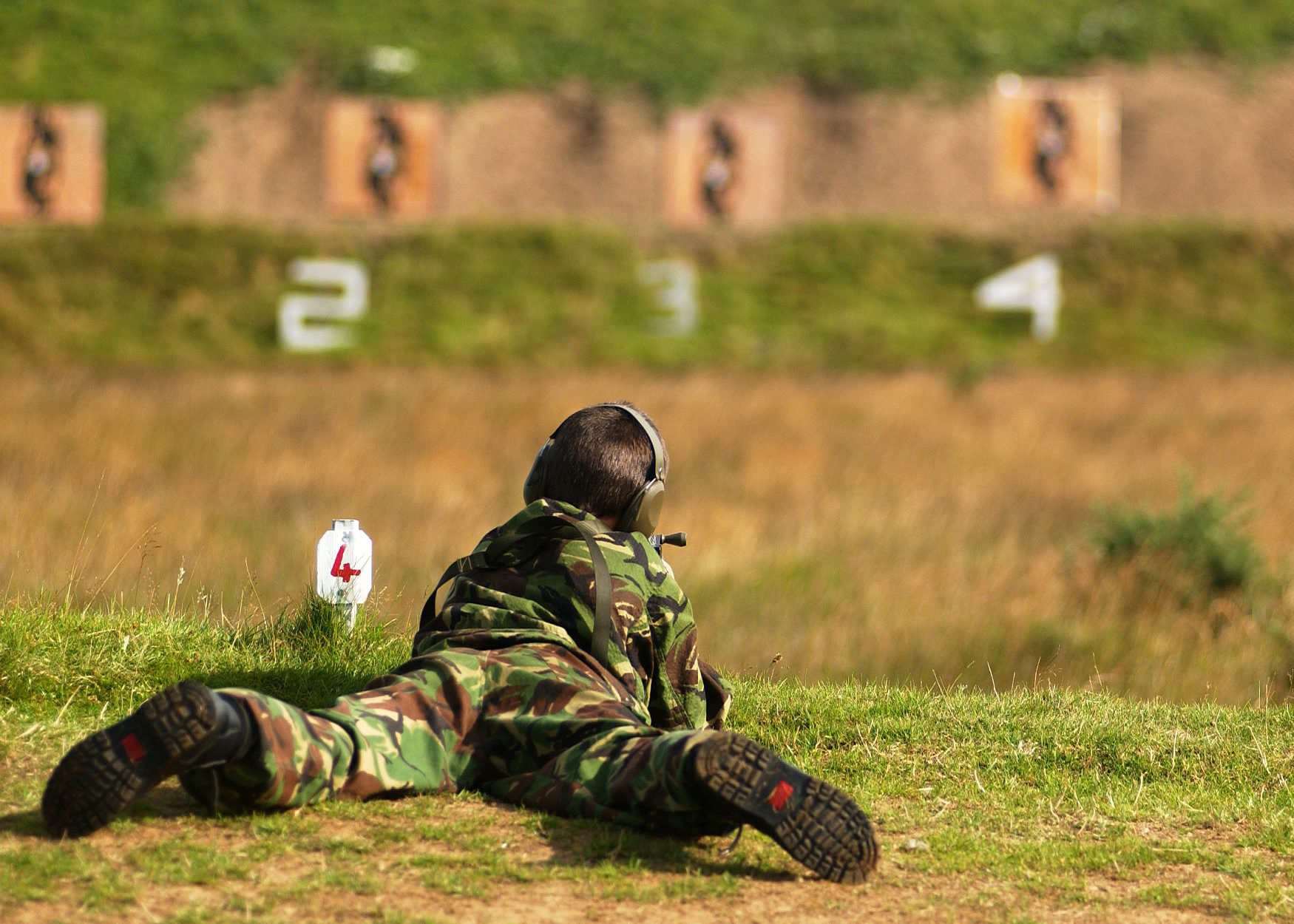
Between 2012 and 2017, the Ministry of Defence recorded 363 allegations of sexual abuse of members of local youth cadet forces.

Cadet forces are military youth organisations for younger teens in communities and schools. In 2017, a BBC Panorama documentary found multiple cases of the sexual abuse of cadets from age 11 during the 1980s. It reported that the victims and their parents were discouraged from making a formal complaint or contacting the police. In 2012 and 2013, the Ministry of Defence (MOD) paid £2 million to settle the allegations out of court. Between 2012 and 2017, the MOD recorded a further 363 allegations, of which 282 were referred to the police.

=== Intimate partners ===
In 2022, research by King's College London found that experience of intimate partner violence (IPV), a category that includes sexual abuse, was three times more prevalent among partners of military personnel than among partners of civilians. 10% of male and 7% of female personnel told the researchers they had abused their partner in the previous 12 months. The study found that physical and sexual abuse of partners was particularly common where personnel had traumatic experiences of war.

=== Detainees ===
During the 2003 invasion of Iraq, two Iraqi sailors working on a merchant ship were arrested and taken on board a Coalition warship and made to strip naked, after which they were sexually humiliated. In a subsequent court case brought by Leigh Day against the Ministry of Defence, a judge noted that the nationality of the warship in question (i.e., whether it was British or American) was unable to be determined.

== Perpetrators ==
Perpetrators of sexual misconduct are overwhelmingly male colleagues, typically those of the same or higher rank than the women they victimise.

Of the suspects in nine sexual offence cases affecting 22 junior recruits at the Army Foundation College in 2021, three of the accused were members of staff.

== Institutional responses ==
Following concerns expressed in 2004 by the Equal Opportunities Commission (now the Equality and Human Rights Commission) about persistent sexual harassment in the British armed forces, the armed forces began to conduct surveys of their personnel's experience of sexual harassment.

In 2016, the head of the army noted that soldier culture remained 'overly sexualised' and committed to reducing the extent of sexual misconduct.

In 2017, the Lyons Review into the service justice system recommended referring all serious offences in the armed forces, including those of a sexual nature, to the civilian police, a proposal the government rejected.

In 2019, the Wigston Review into inappropriate behaviours in the armed forces acknowledged that such behaviours were at an 'unacceptable level'. It recommended that responsibility for 'serious behavioural complaints' be transferred from the chain of command to a new 'Defence Authority', separate from the three military branches (i.e. army, air force, navy).

In 2021, a major report by the House of Commons Defence Committee, the Atherton Report, declared the committee 'alarmed and appalled' at the extent of sexual harassment and assault in the military. The Committee recommended the MOD 'remove the chain of command entirely from complaints of a sexual nature', which the government again rejected.

== Barriers to prevention and redress ==
=== Military structure and culture ===
The 2019 Wigston Review reported that several essential characteristics of military organisations contributed to an ongoing elevated rates of misconduct: 'tight-knit units that perceive themselves as "elite"; masculine cultures with low gender diversity; rank gradients; age gradients; weak or absent controls, especially after extensive operational periods; and alcohol.'

In 2021, the Commons Defence Committee added that while the military chain of command had determined to tackle the problem, senior officers were often part of it, noting evidence of

'...senior individuals engaging in unacceptable behaviour themselves (including criminal sexual offences), failing to challenge these behaviours (for example, watching without commenting or breaching the confidentiality of those seeking advice) or interfering negatively in how a complaint is handled [...] The stories that we heard are truly shocking and they gravely concern us... In particular, we are disturbed by repeated examples of senior ranks failing those they command...'

The Committee took evidence from over 4,000 women, who frequently 'advocated more effective education of male and female personnel about what sexual harassment is and how to deal with it effectively (without focusing on women "avoiding" sexual harassment and assault). They also wanted more action to enable all personnel to speak out if they witnessed derogatory treatment. A few stated that more should be done to ensure that women feel safe...'

=== Complaints ===
According to the army's 2021 sexual harassment survey, four-fifths of women who had had a particularly upsetting experience of sexual harassment did not report it to the chain of command or the service police. Similarly low rates of complaint were found in the navy and air force. The most common reasons included low confidence in the chain of command and concerns that complaint could bring repercussions for the person concerned; many women said they preferred to deal with the problem themselves.

=== Convictions ===
The number of investigations by the military justice system for serious sexual offences is low and convictions are rare. In 2021, 0.9% of soldiers said they had been raped, equivalent to 740 individuals in the army. In the same year, 28 rape cases were investigated by the Royal Military Police, of which five went to trial and two led to conviction.

The table below includes data from other recent years.

Rape in the British army: Personnel alleging rape in official surveys versus cases investigated by the Royal Military Police, defendants tried at court martial, and convictions (2018–2021)
Year	Individuals alleging rape (% [n])	Cases investigated (n)	Defendants tried (n)	Convictions (n)
2018	'<1%' [sic] [c. 0–811 individuals among 81,120 personnel]	20	4	1
2019	n/a	19	8	1
2020	n/a	15	5	2
2021	0.9% [c. 740 individuals among 82,230 personnel]	28	5	2

== See also ==
- Sexual harassment in the military
- Sexual assault in the Canadian forces
- Sexual assault in the United States military
- Women in the military
- Children in the military
- Wartime sexual violence
- Military sexual trauma
- Suicide in the military
