= Sexual harassment in the military =

Sexual misconduct in the armed forces

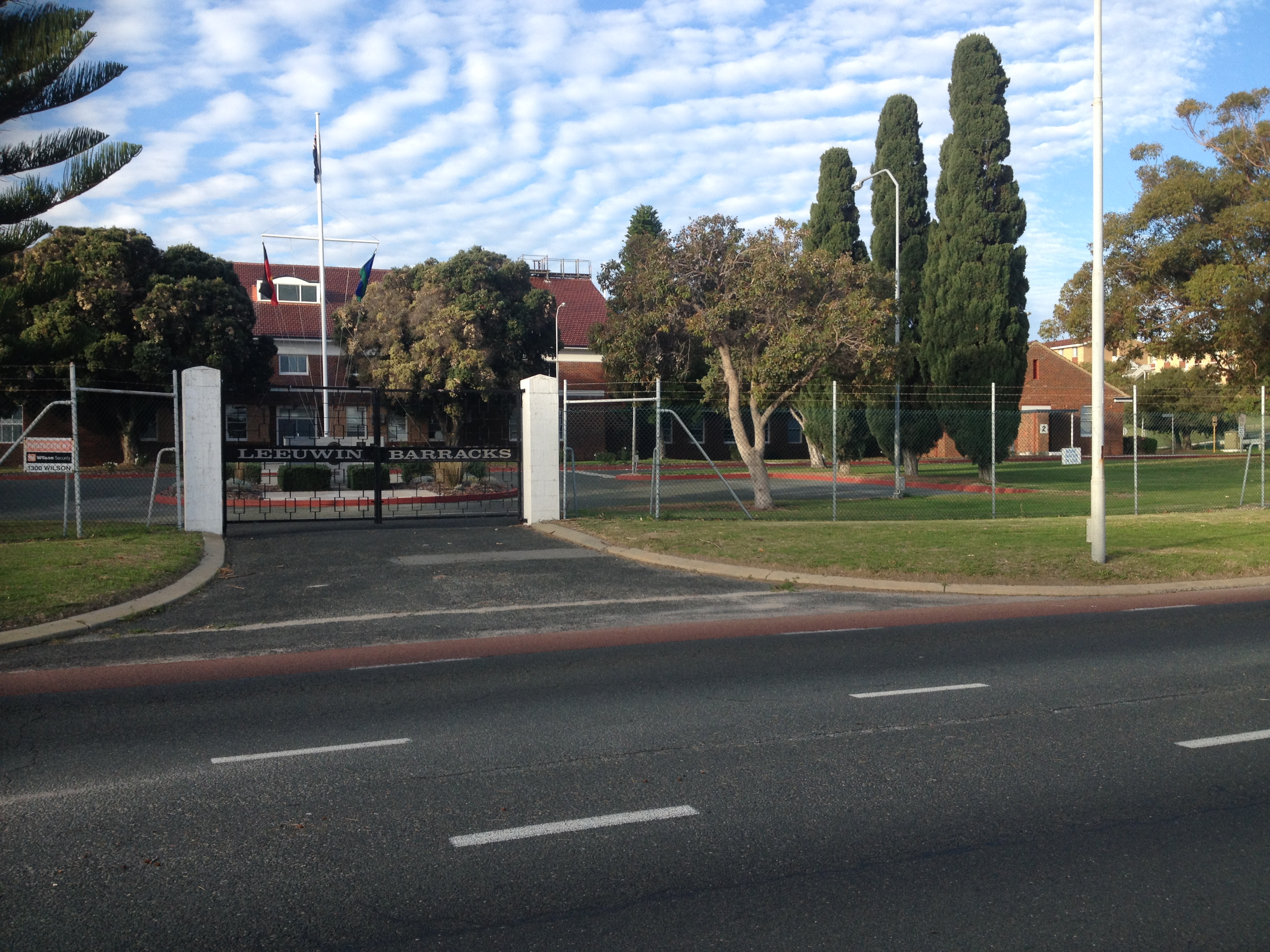
Leeuwin Barracks, Australia, site of widespread sexual abuse of child navy recruits between 1967 and 1971

Sexual harassment in the military is unwanted sexual behaviour experienced as threatening, offensive, or otherwise upsetting, which occurs in a military setting.

Sexual harassment is more common in military than civilian life. Military women and men experience unwanted behaviours disproportionately, particularly younger women and girls. Other groups at high risk include partners of personnel, child cadets, and military detainees.

Risk factors characteristic of a military setting include the young average age of personnel, isolated workplaces, the minority status of women, hierarchical power relationships, a culture of conformity, the predominance of traditionally masculine values and behaviours, and a heavy drinking culture. Harassment is particularly common in certain settings, notably centres for initial military training and theatres of war.

Experience of harassment can be traumatic. It increases the risk of stress-related mental illness, particularly post-traumatic stress disorder (PTSD). Nonetheless, typically most of those targeted choose not to raise a formal complaint, expecting repercussions if they do.

Despite the development of prevention programmes in recent years, official statistics in Canada, the United Kingdom and the United States report increasing rates of sexual harassment in the military.

== Definitions ==
Sexual harassment is unwanted sexual behaviour experienced as threatening or otherwise upsetting. Definitions in use by state armed forces include:

- Australian Defence Forces: Unwanted sexual advances or sexual requests towards to another person
- British Army: Unwanted sexually based conduct or other conduct affecting the dignity of women and men at work.
- Canadian Armed Forces: Improper conduct directed at and offensive to others, which the perpetrator ought reasonably know would be so.
- United States Armed Forces: Unwanted sexual advances and other behaviour of a sexual nature.

== Behaviours ==
Sexual harassment in the military includes a broad spectrum of behaviour.

Undirected behaviours are those not personally targeted but which affect the working environment, such as sexist and sexual jokes and the prominent display of pornographic material.

Directed behaviours target one or more individuals, such as hazing rituals, unwanted sexual advances, and sexual assault.

Research in Canada has found that a military culture of undirected sexual harassment increases the risk of directed sexual harassment and assault.

=== Case examples ===
A woman in the British army told researchers in 2006:

A friend was out on an exercise when a group of men ducked her head in a bucket of water and each time she came up for breath she had to repeat "I am useless and I am a female". She told the story and said it was a joke but I could see she was upset.

The Deschamps Review of 2015 found pervasive demeaning attitudes to women in the Canadian armed forces:

Interviewees reported regularly being told of orders to "stop being pussies" and to "leave your purses at home" [...] The use of the word "cunt", for example, is commonplace, and rape jokes are tolerated. [...] A commonly held attitude is that, rather than be a soldier, a sailor or an aviator, a woman will be labeled an "ice princess", a "bitch", or a "slut". Another saying is that women enter the CAF "to find a man, to leave a man, or to become a man".

A woman in the French army was raped by her commanding officer:

It was months before I could pronounce the word "rape"... I blamed myself. I said: "We are trained in hand to hand combat. Why didn't I stop him?" But when that happens you are terrorised.

Many incidents of sexual harassment and assault in the US armed forces have been documented. For example:

When a woman in the US army attended a sexual harassment awareness training, the senior officer teaching the class asked participants whether they would hit on "a naked, drunk girl on the bench outside your barracks", adding, "you're not supposed to but I probably would".

US Senator Martha McSally, formerly of the US Air Force and the first female pilot to fly combat operations, testified to a Senate meeting that she was raped by a superior officer. McSally explained that she never reported the incident for lack of trust in the military justice system. She added that she blamed herself, and that although she had thought herself strong, she felt powerless.

The US Navy Tailhook Association scandal exposed multiple acts of sexual violence during the organisation's annual convention of aviators in Las Vegas. Lieutenant Paula Puopolo (then Coughlin) blew the whistle on a run-the-gauntlet ritual, in which male officers lined the third-floor corridor of the convention hotel to harass and assault women passing through. In 1991, the men sexually assaulted 83 women, including Puopolo, and seven men. As reported in the Wall Street Journal:

Puopolo says up to 200 disheveled airmen set upon her. She was fondled and passed along from one groping, pinching set of hands to another before being dropped to the ground. At breakfast, Puopolo reported the incident to [Rear Admiral] Snyder, himself a former president of the association. "He said that's what you get when you go down a hallway full of drunken aviators," she recalls.

== Principal targets ==
=== Female personnel ===
While some male personnel are sexually harassed, women are much more likely to be targeted.

Younger women and girls face a greater risk, according to American, British, Canadian, and French research. For example, girls aged under 18 in the British armed forces were ten times as likely as adult female personnel to be the victim of a sexual offence in 2021.

=== Intimate partners ===
In 2022, research in the UK armed forces found that experience of intimate partner violence (IPV), a category that includes sexual abuse, was three times more prevalent among partners of military personnel than among partners of civilians. 10% of male and 7% of female personnel told the researchers they had abused their partner in the previous 12 months. The study found that physical and sexual abuse of partners was particularly common where personnel had traumatic experiences of war.

In the US armed forces, estimates of the sexual abuse of military partners indicate a similarly high rate of annual incidence, ranging from 12% to 40%.

=== Child cadets ===
Cadet forces, common worldwide, are military youth organisations in communities and schools. Some evidence from the UK, where hundreds of complaints of the sexual abuse of cadets have been recorded since 2012, and from Canada, where one in ten complaints of sexual assault in the military are from the cadet organisations, indicate that these institutions are susceptible to a culture of sexual harassment.

=== Detainees ===
Individuals detained by militaries are particularly vulnerable to sexual harassment. During the Iraq War, for example, personnel of the U.S. Army and Central Intelligence Agency (CIA) committed multiple human rights violations against detainees in Abu Ghraib prison, including rape, sodomy, and other forms of sexual abuse. Similarly, two Iraqi men detained on a Coalition warship at the start of the war were made to strip naked and were sexually humiliated.

== Prevalence ==
While prevalence varies by country, military branch, and other factors, official statistics and peer-reviewed research from Canada, France, the UK, and the US indicate that between a quarter and a third of military women in these countries are sexually harassed at work at least once each year.

Military training settings are characterised by a particularly high level of sexual harassment and assault relative to both the civilian population and other military settings.

Research further shows an increase in perpetration during and after deployment on military operations.

Studies of sexual harassment have found that it is markedly more common in military than civilian settings For example, between 2015 and 2020, girls aged 16 or 17 in the British armed forces were twice as likely as their same-age civilian peers to report rape or other sexual assault.

== Risk factors ==
Several reasons for a high prevalence of sexual harassment in the military have been suggested.

A Canadian study has found that key risk factors associated with military settings are the typically young age of personnel, the isolated locations of bases, the minority status of women, and the disproportionate number of men in senior positions.

An emphasis in military organisations on conformity, obedience, and hierarchical power relations, combine to increase the risk, particularly to personnel of low rank, who are less able than others to resist inappropriate expectations made of them.

Traditionally masculine values and behaviours that are rewarded and reinforced in military settings are also thought to play a role.

In the UK, the 2019 Wigston Review into inappropriate sexual behaviours in the armed forces reported that several military factors contributed to risk: "tight-knit units that perceive themselves as 'elite'; masculine cultures with low gender diversity; rank gradients; age gradients; weak or absent controls, especially after extensive operational periods; and alcohol."

== Effects ==
Women affected by sexual harassment are more likely than other women to suffer stress-related mental illness afterwards.

Research in the US found that when sexual abuse of female military personnel was psychiatrically traumatic, the odds of suffering from post-traumatic stress disorder (PTSD) after deployment on operations increased by a factor of nine, and the odds of suicide more than doubled.

Research in the US has found that personnel affected by sexual harassment are somewhat less likely to develop depression or PTSD if a formal report leads to effective action to address the issue.

== Institutional responses ==
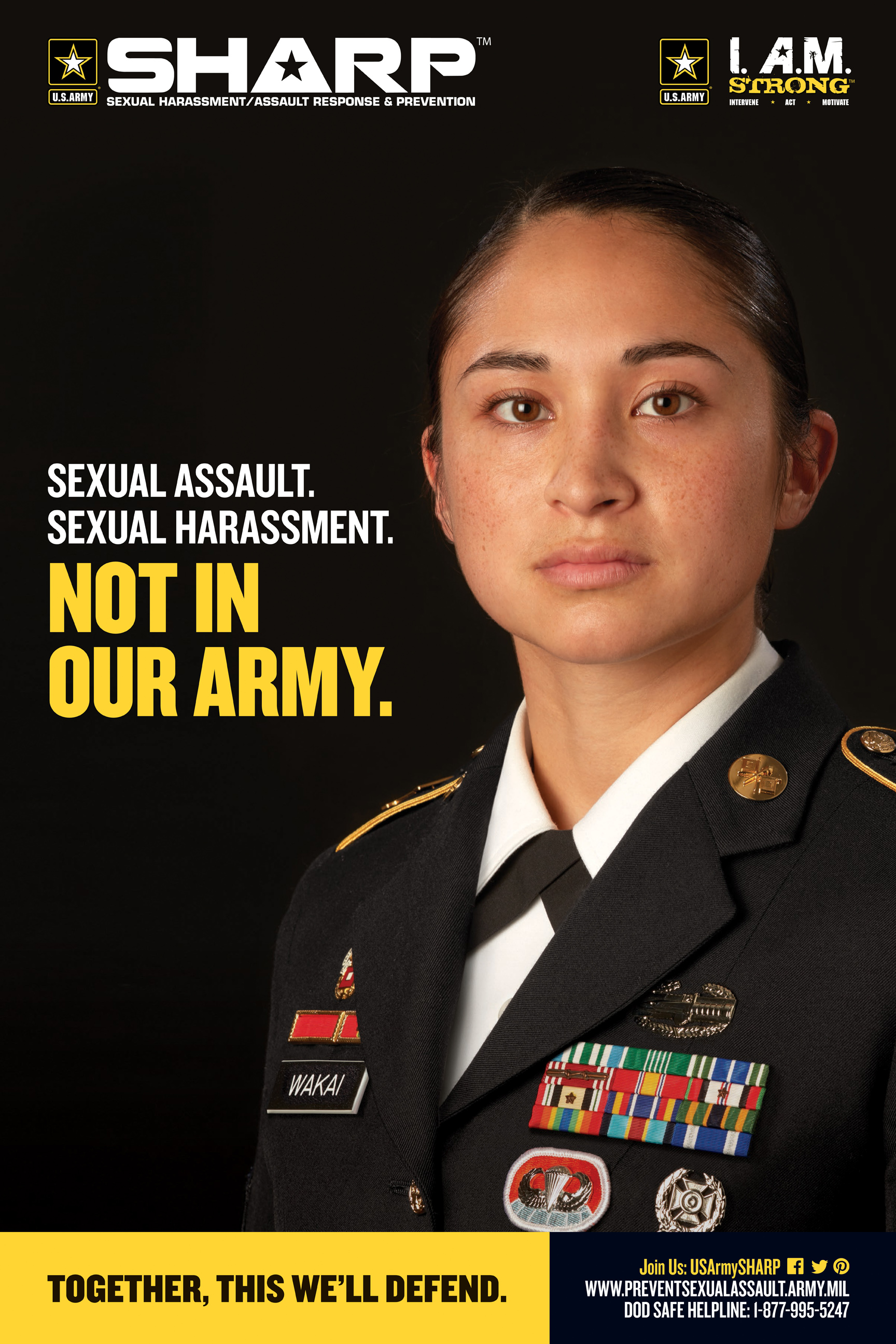
Poster created by the U.S. Army's Sexual Harassment/Assault Response & Prevention (SHARP)

The military leadership in some countries has begun to acknowledge a culture of sexual misconduct among personnel. For example:

- The British armed forces co-commissioned their first formal study of the problem in 2006. In 2016, the head of the British army noted that soldier culture remained "overly sexualised" and committed to reducing the extent of sexual misconduct.
- In 2016, after a major study uncovered widespread sexual harassment and assault in the Canadian armed forces, General Jonathan Vance, Chief of the Defence Staff, acknowledged: "Harmful sexual behaviour is a real problem in our institution."
- The US established the Sexual Assault Prevention and Response Office in 2005, which reports annually. In 2019, Secretary of Defense Lloyd Austin remarked nonetheless that prevention efforts remained "far short of what is required to make lasting change".

Since the number of official complaints represents only a fraction of sexual harassment incidence, armed forces committed to reducing prevalence produce periodic estimates of its true extent by means of anonymised surveys.

Other prevention initiatives, varying by country, include bystander and diversity training, and helplines. Despite these steps, official statistics in Canada, the UK, and the US over the last decade show high and increasing rates of harassment.

== Barriers to redress ==
Military personnel are frequently reluctant to report incidents of sexual misconduct:

- An official report of the Australian Defence Force concluded that women affected by harassment were less likely to make a complaint because they do not expect a serious response.
- Leila Minano, the co-author of a book documenting sexual abuse in the French armed forces, has commented that women are systematically discouraged from complaining, and often moved out of their unit if they do.
- The ombudsperson of the Canadian armed forces confirmed that women fear the consequences if they report a sexual offence to their chain of command: "The fear of repercussions is blatant", he said in 2014. In 2015, the Deschamps Review reported that one of the main reasons why personnel do not lodge a complaint is a fear of the consequences for their career and that many complainants had indeed faced reprisals.
- An official report on sexual harassment in the British army in 2015 found that almost half of personnel who had an 'upsetting' experience of sexual harassment did not complain to their chain of command for fear of damaging their career. A major report by the House of Commons Defence Committee in 2021 called on the Ministry of Defence to "remove the chain of command entirely from complaints of a sexual nature".
- In the US armed forces, a study in 2016 found that 58% of women who reported sexual misconduct by peers said that they had met with retaliation. The Department of Defense estimated in 2017 that two in three victims of sexual assault do not report it.

== Sexual harassment in the military: country examples ==
=== Australia ===
Widespread reports of sexual harassment in the Australian armed forces led to the establishment of the Defence Abuse Response Taskforce to investigate complaints from women between 1991 and 2011. It received 2,439 complaints, of which it deemed 1,751 to be plausible.

A Royal Commission into institutional child sexual abuse was established in 2012, which investigated widespread allegations of historical abuse in the navy. The Commission took evidence from 8,000 individuals and reported in 2017 that many recruits of both sexes and from the age of 15 had been repeatedly sexually abused by older recruits between 1967 and 1971, including by anal gang rape, and in some cases young recruits had been forced to rape each other. The practice was "tolerated" by senior staff, according to the Commission.

=== Canada ===
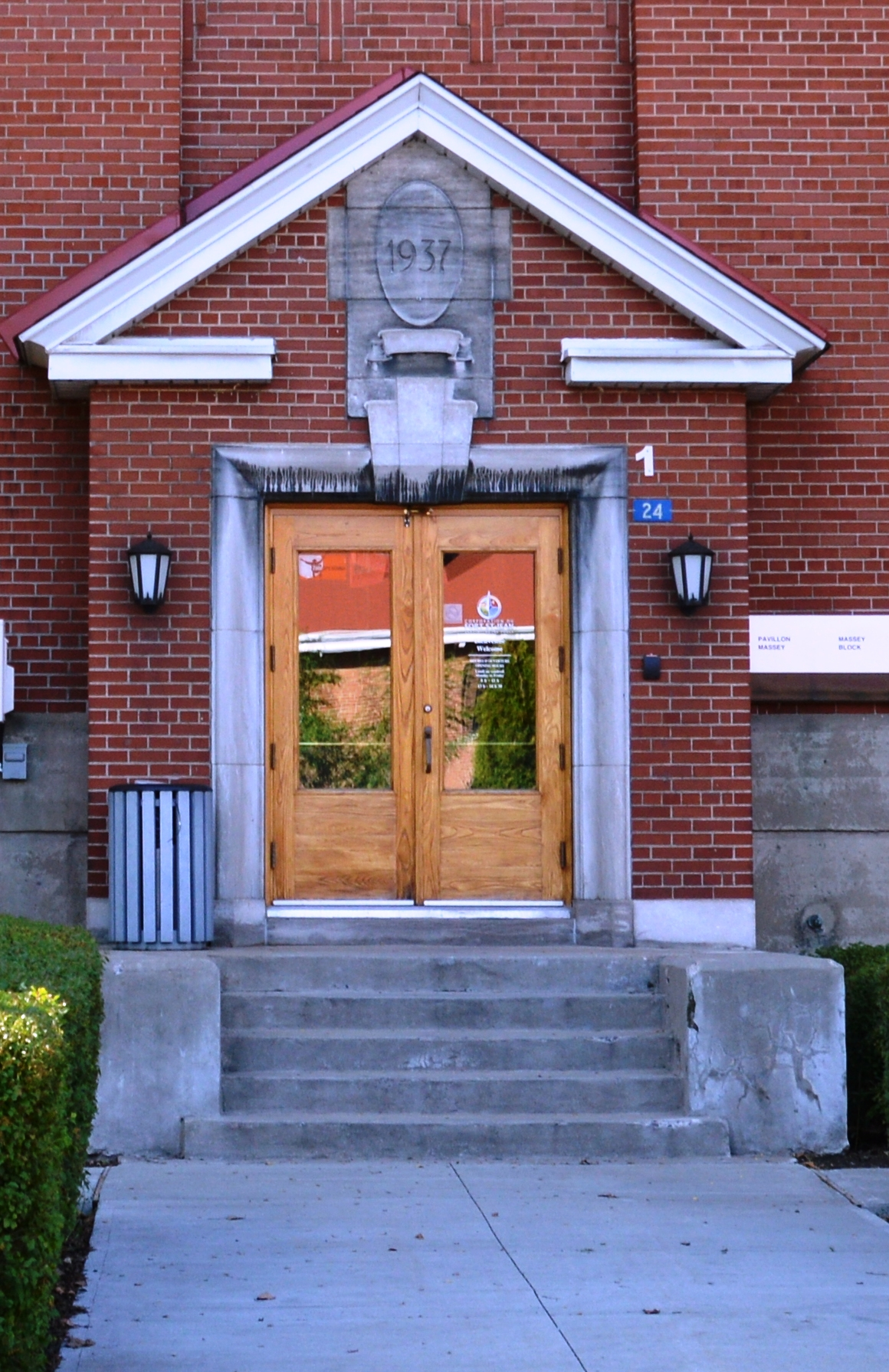
Royal Military College Saint-Jean, Canada, training centre for recruits from age 16 and characterised by a "hostile environment and mistreatment of many female cadets" (Arbour Review)

In 2014, the ombudsman of the Canadian armed forces described sexual harassment in the institution as "'a huge problem"'.

In 2015, after widespread allegations of sexual misconduct in the military, a major official report, the External Review into Sexual Misconduct and Sexual Harassment in the Canadian Armed Forces (the Deschamps Review), was published. It found that sexual harassment was commonplace and embedded in military culture, and that pervasive degrading attitudes to women and LGBT personnel were jeopardising their safety. The Deschamps Review also criticised the armed forces for a culture of dismissiveness; one male interviewee told the Review, for example: "Girls that come to the Army know what to expect." The Review stated that senior NCOs are frequently seen as tolerating sexual harassment and discouraging the individuals affected from making a complaint.

The Canadian Armed Forces have since conducted major surveys of personnel in 2016 and 2018. In each instance, the following proportions of female personnel reported being personally targeted by sexualised or discriminatory behaviour in the previous 12 months:

- 2016: 31%.
- 2018: 28%.

In 2022, a further major report, the Arbour Review, concluded that female armed forces personnel were more likely to be attacked by their peers than the enemy.

Higher rates of harassment have been identified in military training centres. The rate of sexual harassment of women at military colleges in Canada was found in 2019 to be approximately twice (28%) that found in civilian colleges (15%). According to the Arbour Review, training centres are characterised by a "hostile environment and mistreatment of many female cadets", including the Collège militaire royal de Saint-Jean, which trains new recruits from age 16.

A notable case of a perpetrator is that of Russell Williams, a colonel in the Royal Canadian Air Force, who was charged with the sexual assault of two women in connection with two home invasions near Tweed, Ontario in September 2009. Williams was also charged in the death of Corporal Marie-France Comeau, a 37-year-old military traffic technician, who had been found dead at home in late November 2009. He was sentenced in 2010 to two concurrent terms of life imprisonment.

=== France ===
The extent of sexual harassment in the French armed forces first came to prominence in 2014 when 35 cases of harassment and assault were detailed in La Guerre Invisible, a book by Leila Minano and Julia Pascual. According to the Independent newspaper, the armed forces had not been required to report incidents or to keep statistics, and an official report acknowledged that awareness of the problem had been institutionally suppressed.

A study in 2021 found that 37% of women and 18% of men in a representative sample from the French military had experienced verbal or physical sexual harassment in the previous 12 months, and that 13% of women and 4% of men had been sexually assaulted. The incidence rates of sexual harassment and sexual assault experienced by women aged under 25 were particularly high, at 41% and 21% respectively. 22% of women of the lowest rank, who are typically those who have recently enlisted, said they had been sexually assaulted.

=== Germany ===
In 2014, the German armed forces reported that 55% of female and 12% of male personnel had experienced sexual harassment during their career, and that 3% of women said they had been sexually assaulted or raped.

In November 2026, a study by the German Center for Military History and Social Sciences found that more than 60% of the country's military women had experienced some form of sexual harassment or abuse during their service, including sexual comments, degrading behavior, and sexual violence.

=== Japan ===
There have been several reports of sexual assaults in the Japanese Self-Defense Forces (JSDF).

=== Norway ===
In 2021, the Armed Forces Research Institute found that 46% of all military women, 63% of women under 30, and 73% of new female recruits had experienced sexual harassment at least once in the previous 12 months.

=== United Kingdom ===
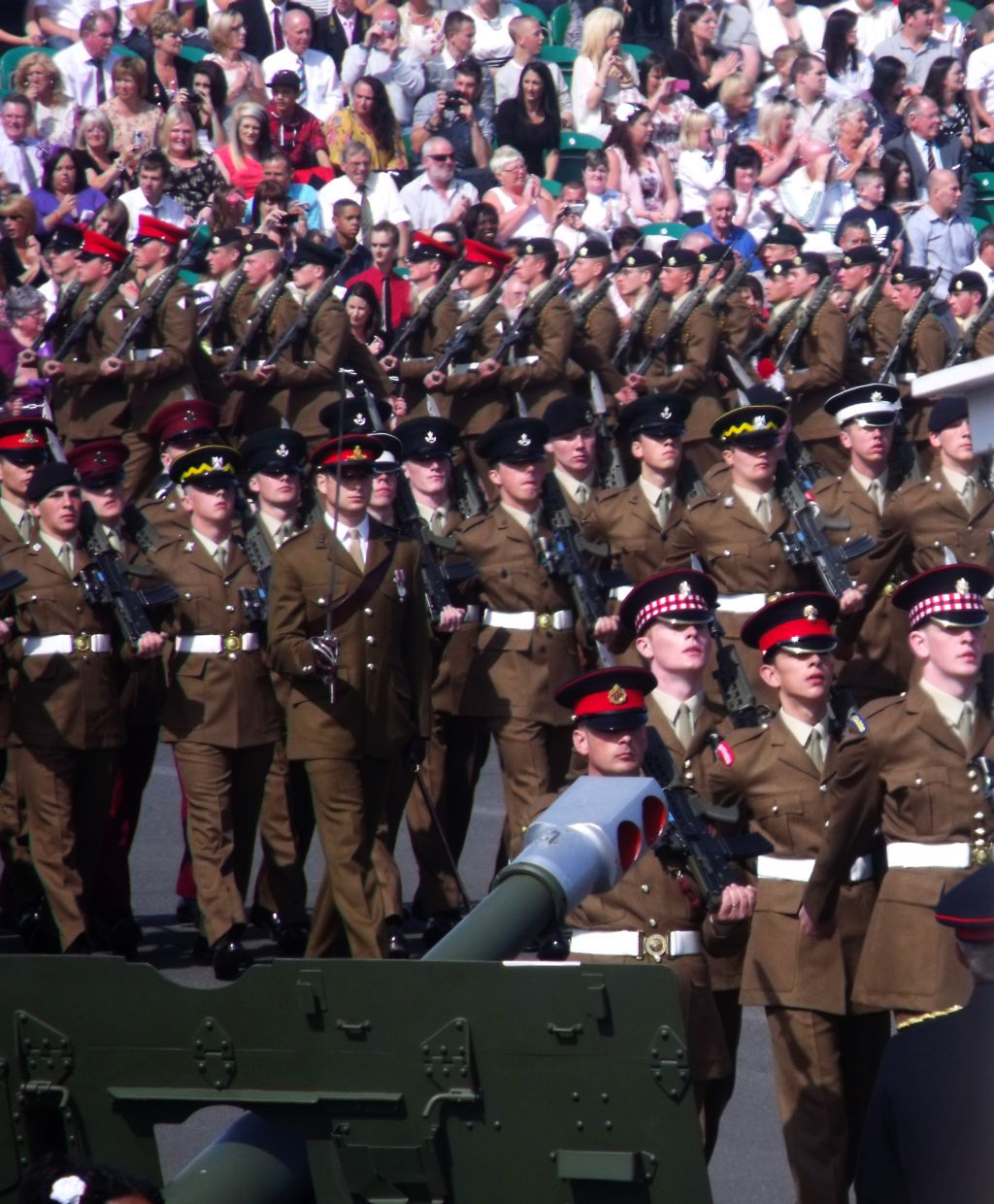
Army Foundation College, Harrogate, site of 22 of 37 recorded sexual offences against girls aged under 18 in the UK armed forces in 2021

==== UK armed forces ====
Following concerns expressed in 2004 by the UK Equal Opportunities Commission (now the Equality and Human Rights Commission) about persistent sexual harassment in the British armed forces, a number of anonymised, official surveys have been undertaken. The first, in 2006, found that a male-dominated culture sexualised women and diminished their military competence. Among the comments made to researchers by male personnel about their female counterparts were: "Ok there are a few exceptions but on the whole they [women] shouldn't be here"; "They're all lesbians or sluts"; and "They are emotionally unstable." The report found that 15% of women had had a 'particularly upsetting' experience of sexual harassment in the previous 12 months; the proportion rose to 20% in the youngest age group.

Since 2009, official surveys asking the same question have found steadily rising rates of women in the army reporting particularly upsetting experiences, as follows:

- 2009: 8%
- 2015: 13%
- 2018: 15%
- 2021: 35%

In 2021, the same question asked of women in the Royal Navy and Royal Air Force found rates of 43% and 35%, respectively.

In 2021, 37 girls aged under 18 across the British armed forces (from a total population at the time of 290) were victims of a sexual offence. 22 were new recruits at the training centre for the army's youngest recruits (aged from 16 years), the Army Foundation College; three of the accused in these cases were members of staff.

==== Military youth organisations ====
In 2017, a BBC Panorama documentary found multiple cases of the sexual abuse of cadets from age 11 during the 1980s. It reported that the victims and their parents were discouraged from making a formal complaint or contacting the police. In 2012 and 2013, the Ministry of Defence (MOD) paid £2 million to settle the allegations out of court. Between 2012 and 2017, the MOD recorded a further 363 allegations, of which 282 were referred to the police.

=== United States ===
Since 2014, surveys of US military personnel have found a high prevalence of sexual harassment. The following rates refer to the proportion of women reporting that they had experienced harassment in the previous 12 months.

- 2014: 21.5%
- 2016: 21.4%
- 2018: 24.2%

In the same years, 5–6% of servicewomen said they had been sexually assaulted in the previous 12 months; rates at initial training centres were found to be substantially higher.

In 2017, the Department of Defense reported that an estimated 14,900 military personnel were sexually assaulted in 2016, of whom 6,172 made an official complaint.

In the same year, the Department reported that an active duty military woman who reported sexual harassment to a superior was 16% more likely to be sexually assaulted than one who did not report, while a man who reported increased his chance of sexual assault thereafter by 50%.

== See also ==
- 1995 Okinawa rape incident
- Sexual harassment
- Wartime sexual violence
- Military sexual trauma
- Sexual misconduct in the British military
- Sexual assault in the Canadian forces
- Sexual assault in the United States military
- Sexual assault in the Japan Self-Defense Forces
- 2022 JSDF sexual assault incident
- Misconduct in the military
- Suicide in the military
- Women in the military
- Children in the military
- Dedovshchina (hazing ritual in the Russian military)
- British soldiers and allegations of sexual exploitation in Kenya
