= Suicide in warfare =

Suicide in warfare may refer to

- Suicide attack – an attack on the enemy that intentionally involve the death of the attacker.

Peak of use in warfare: Suicide attack § During the World Wars and interwar period

- Suicide mission – military and similar operations where the death of the operative is intended or expected.
- Suicide in the military – Suicide risks in the armed forces
