= David Cochrane =

David or Dave Cochrane may refer to:

- David Cochrane (footballer) (1910–?), Scottish footballer
- Dave Cochrane (baseball) (born 1963), Major League Baseball utility player
- Dave Cochrane (Canadian Forces officer), Royal Canadian Air Force officer
- Dave Cochrane (musician), English bass guitarist
- David Cochrane (journalist), Canadian journalist
