= Attorney General Cochrane =

Attorney General Cochrane may refer to:

- James Cochrane (judge) (1798–1883), Attorney General of Gibraltar
- John Cochrane (politician) (1813–1898), Attorney General of New York

== See also ==
- General Cochrane (disambiguation)
