= Jim Smyth =

Canadian police officer

James Martin Gordon Smyth
- Born: James Martin Gordon Smyth
- Occupation: Police officer
- Employer: Ontario Provincial Police
- Known for: Interrogations in high-profile cases, including Russell Williams and the murder of Tori Stafford
- Awards: Member of the Order of Merit of the Police Forces; Queen Elizabeth II Diamond Jubilee Medal; Police Exemplary Service Medal

James Martin Gordon "Jim" Smyth MOM is a retired Canadian police officer with the Ontario Provincial Police (OPP), known for his interrogations of Terri-Lynne McClintic, Michael Thomas Rafferty and Russell Williams. Smyth also discovered the remains of Tori Stafford.

Smyth started his career with the York Regional Police in 1989. In June 1997, he began working with the Ontario Provincial Police. In 2000 or 2007, he shifted into the police force's behaviour sciences section.

== Honours ==

Ribbon	Description	Notes
	Order of Merit of the Police Forces (MOM)	Member; 9 September 2014
	Queen Elizabeth II Diamond Jubilee Medal	2012; Canadian Version
	Police Exemplary Service Medal	Medal 23 April 2008; 1st Bar 1 April 2019
