= Murder of Tori Stafford =

2009 murder of eight-year-old girl in Canada

Tori Stafford
- Born: Victoria Elizabeth Marie Stafford; July 15, 2000; Woodstock, Ontario, Canada
- Died: April 8, 2009 (aged 8); Mount Forest, Ontario
- Cause of death: Murder by blunt trauma
- Body discovered: July 19, 2009; Mount Forest, Ontario

Victoria Elizabeth Marie "Tori" Stafford (July 15, 2000 – April 8, 2009) was a Canadian girl who was abducted, raped, and murdered by Michael Rafferty and Terri-Lynne McClintic. Her body was found three months later in a wooded area in rural Ontario. The subsequent investigation and search were the subject of massive media coverage across Canada.

The police response to the situation as it developed, as well as their failure to announce an Amber alert was criticized by the public, and has been the focus of a review of the Amber alert system in Canada. The circumstances of her death were unknown to the public until a publication ban was lifted in December 2010.

== Abduction, murder, and investigation ==
At about 3:30 p.m. on April 8, 2009, Victoria left Oliver Stephens Public School to go home, and was captured on security camera at 3:32 p.m. being led down Fyfe Avenue, Woodstock, by a woman. When she failed to return home, she was reported missing by her mother at 6:04 p.m.

Suspicion initially rested on Victoria’s mother, Tara McDonald, as she had waited two hours to report her daughter missing, even though her walk home from school was only a few blocks. She had been trying to look for her daughter at friends’ and relatives’ houses but did not find her. At around 6:00 p.m., Tara went to police for help and filed Victoria as being a missing person. McDonald was suspected of being the woman in the security footage, which McClintic later confessed to. In an interrogation, McClintic told investigators she lured Stafford to a vehicle with promises of showing her a puppy.

Five days after Stafford's disappearance, police called off the ground search, and her classmates returned to school the next day. The case was featured in the April 25, 2009 episode of America's Most Wanted. The initial investigation was led by the local police, and was later turned into a joint investigation with the Ontario Provincial Police, switching from a missing person investigation to an abduction case.

On May 20, 2009, police charged Michael Thomas Christopher Stephen Rafferty, 28, with first-degree murder and Terri-Lynne McClintic, 18, with being an accessory to murder (in addition to lesser charges) in the abduction and suspected murder of Stafford. Ontario Provincial Police indicated that Victoria’s mother was familiar with McClintic. McClintic assisted the police search for the remains of Stafford after her arrest, and her lawyer stated that her client, "wants Tori's family to know she is trying hard to find her body".

On May 28, 2009, McClintic's charges were altered to a first-degree murder charge and an unlawful confinement charge, and it was announced that the accused would be tried separately.

On July 21, 2009, police confirmed that remains found near Mount Forest two days earlier by Detective-Sergeant Jim Smyth were those of Stafford. Stafford's body was naked from the waist down, wearing only a Hannah Montana T-shirt and a pair of butterfly earrings that she had borrowed from her mother; it was subsequently confirmed that she had both of those on at the time of her disappearance. Her lower half was significantly decomposed. During an autopsy, it was determined that she had suffered a beating which caused lacerations to her liver and 16 broken ribs, and her eventual death was the result of repeated blows to the head with a claw hammer.

== Trial ==
R. v. McClintic
- Court: Superior Court of Justice
- Full case name: Her Majesty The Queen v. Terri-Lynne Ruth McClintic
- Decided: May 19, 2010
- Citations: R. v. McClintic, 2010 ONSC 2944

Court membership
- Judge sitting: Dougald R. McDermid

McClintic was scheduled to make an appearance in court on April 30, 2010, but a publication ban was imposed by the judge on the events of the day. The publication ban was lifted on December 9, 2010, revealing that McClintic had pleaded guilty to first-degree murder. McClintic was sentenced to life in prison with no chance of parole for 25 years and was held at the Grand Valley Institution for Women in Kitchener, Ontario.

R. v. Rafferty
- Court: Superior Court of Justice
- Full case name: Her Majesty The Queen v. Michael Thomas Christopher Stephen Rafferty
- Decided: January 31, 2012
- Verdict: Guilty on all counts
- Citations: R. v. Rafferty, 2012 ONSC 703

Court membership
- Judge sitting: Thomas A. Heeney

On March 5, 2012, Rafferty's trial for the kidnapping, sexual assault, and first-degree murder of Stafford commenced. On May 11, 2012, at 9:18 p.m. ET, the jury found Rafferty guilty on all charges. Four days later, he too was sentenced to life in prison with no chance of parole for 25 years.

Claiming that the "judge's instructions to the jury were flawed", Rafferty appealed his conviction to the Court of Appeal for Ontario on July 26, 2012. The 30-day deadline to appeal had passed by the time the papers were received, but this was attributed to his "inability to use the telephone to contact legal counsel," and an extension was requested. Rafferty's appeal papers appear to have been filed from Kingston Penitentiary. An extension to his appeal was granted.

On June 10, 2013, Rafferty appeared by video in a bid for his appeal. He was turned down for Legal Aid for his appeal process. On August 12, Rafferty had his court date postponed until September 10, 2013. The appeal was set in motion in December 2013, but as of January 20, 2016, no materials had been filed. On October 24, 2016, Rafferty appeared at his appeal hearing at Osgoode Hall in Toronto. The appeal was quickly dismissed the same day.

== Aftermath ==
In October 2018, McClintic was controversially moved to the Okimaw Ohci Healing Lodge in Saskatchewan, run by the Correctional Service of Canada. She was granted the move because she self-identified as an Indigenous person, but whether she is actually Indigenous has not been confirmed and has been disputed by a family member. The lodge, a minimum/medium-security prison, is unfenced but monitored 24 hours a day with video cameras.

Conservative MP Candice Bergen introduced a motion in Parliament to condemn and overturn the decision. The motion generated a day's acrimonious debate and was defeated 200–82, with all Liberal MPs voting against it. Under increasing public pressure, Minister of Public Safety Ralph Goodale issued an order for Correctional Service Canada to review the decision and the general policy. On November 7, Goodale announced that McClintic would be returned to a federal prison, and regulations for transferring long-term prisoners to healing lodges would be made stricter. She was transferred to the multi-level Edmonton Institution for Women.

== See also ==
- List of solved missing person cases (post-2000)
- Murder of Holly Jones
- Karla Homolka and Paul Bernardo
- Neuschwanstein murder case in June 2023
