= Russell Williams (criminal) =

Canadian criminal and former colonel (born 1963)

- Born: David Russell Williams; March 7, 1963 (age 63); Bromsgrove, Worcestershire, England
- Occupations: Former wing commander of CFB Trenton and pilot
- Spouse: Mary Elizabeth Harriman (m. 1991; div. 2014)
- Status: Under sentence for life, currently incarcerated
- Convictions: First-degree murder; Sexual assault; Forcible confinement; Breaking and entering
- Penalty: Life imprisonment with a possibility of parole after 25 years

Details
- Victims: 86 known (2 homicide, 2 sexual assault) Marie-France Comeau (Murdered) Jessica Lloyd (Murdered)
- Span of crimes: 2007–2010
- Country: Canada
- State: Ontario (Province)
- Killed: 2
- Date apprehended: February 8, 2010
- Imprisoned at: Port-Cartier Institution
- Military career
- Allegiance: Canada
- Branch: Royal Canadian Air Force
- Rank: Colonel (stripped)
- Unit: CFB Trenton
- Conflicts: War in Afghanistan

David Russell Williams (born March 7, 1963) is a Canadian serial rapist, murderer and disgraced former colonel in the Royal Canadian Air Force. Williams was born in Bromsgrove, Worcestershire, England and his family later emigrated to Canada. He studied economics and political science at the Scarborough campus of the University of Toronto before embarking on a career in the Canadian Forces. He was also a qualified pilot who had flown Canadian Forces VIP aircraft for dignitaries and heads of state. From July 2009 until his arrest, Williams commanded CFB Trenton, Canada's largest military airbase and a hub for the country's foreign and domestic air transport operations.

In late January 2010, the Ontario Provincial Police (OPP) discovered evidence implicating Williams in the disappearance and death of Jessica Lloyd, and suspected links to two other crimes that had been committed in proximity to his previous home in Tweed, Ontario. On February 7, Williams was interrogated on video by OPP investigator Jim Smyth and confronted with the evidence of tire tracks and boot prints at Lloyd's house. Over the next 10 hours, Williams gave a detailed confession of the sexual assault and murder of Lloyd. He also confessed to the sexual assault and murder of Corporal Marie-France Comeau, as well as at least two other cases initially.

Subsequent investigation into Williams brought further confessions and revealed evidence of detailed notes and photographs stored at his home. Evidence showed he had broken into at least 82 houses to steal women's and girls' underwear, which later escalated to sexual assaults and later still to the rapes and murders. Williams was charged with two counts of first-degree murder, two counts of forcible confinement, two counts of breaking and entering and sexual assault. Another 82 charges relating to breaking and entering were later added.

On October 21, 2010, Williams was sentenced to two life sentences for first-degree murder, two 10-year sentences for other sexual assaults, two 10-year sentences for forcible confinement, and 82 one-year sentences for breaking and entering, all to be served concurrently. The life sentences mean Williams will serve a minimum of 25 years before parole eligibility. Because he was convicted of multiple murders, he is not eligible for early parole under the "faint hope clause" of the Criminal Code. Following charges being made in February 2010, he was fired from his post. Following his conviction in October 2010, he was stripped of his commission, ranks and awards by the Governor General on the recommendation of the Chief of the Defence Staff. Williams' uniform, documents and military equipment were destroyed by the Canadian military.

== Early life and education ==
David Russell Williams was born in Bromsgrove, Worcestershire, England, on March 7, 1963, to Christine Nonie (née Chivers) and Cedric David Williams. His family immigrated to Canada in 1968, settling in Chalk River, Ontario. Williams' father was hired as a metallurgist at Chalk River Laboratories, a Canadian nuclear research laboratory. After this relocation, the Williams family met another family, the Sovkas, and they became good friends. Williams' parents divorced when he was six years old, and soon after his mother married Dr. Jerry Sovka. During this time, Williams took his stepfather's name. The family moved to Toronto in 1970 and to the suburb of Scarborough (now a part of Toronto) in 1975.

Williams began high school at Birchmount Collegiate in 1978. The family moved to Busan, South Korea in 1979 where his stepfather was overseeing another reactor project. In 1980, Williams and his brother were sent back to Toronto to attend high school as boarding students at Upper Canada College (UCC). He delivered the Globe and Mail newspaper and learned to play the piano. In his final year in 1982, he was selected as a prefect for his boarding house. Williams then studied economics and political science at the Scarborough campus of the University of Toronto, where another notorious Canadian murderer, Paul Bernardo, was coincidentally two academic years ahead of him. Williams graduated with a Bachelor of Arts in 1986. There, he engaged in pranks against his roommates, picking locked doors and hiding in rooms for hours to surprise the occupants.

== Military service ==
Williams joined the Canadian Forces in 1987, received his flying wings in 1990 and was posted to 3 Canadian Forces Flying Training School, based at CFB Portage la Prairie, Manitoba, where he served for two years as an instructor.

Promoted to captain on January 1, 1991, Williams was posted to 434 Combat Support Squadron at CFB Shearwater, Nova Scotia, in 1992, where he flew the CC-144 Challenger in the electronic warfare and coastal patrol role. In 1994, he was posted to the 412 Transport Squadron in Ottawa, where he transported VIPs, including high-ranking government officials and foreign dignitaries, also on Challengers. Williams was then promoted to major in November 1999 and was posted to Director General Military Careers in Ottawa, where he served as the multi-engine pilot career manager.

Williams earned a Master of Defence Studies from the Royal Military College of Canada in 2004 with a 55-page thesis that supported pre-emptive war in Iraq. In June 2004 he was promoted to lieutenant-colonel, and the following month he was appointed commanding officer of 437 Transport Squadron at CFB Trenton, Ontario, a post he held for two years. From December 2005 to May 2006, Williams also served as the commanding officer of Camp Mirage, a secretive logistics facility believed to be located at Al Minhad Air Base in Dubai, United Arab Emirates, that provided support to Canadian Forces operations in Afghanistan.

Williams was posted to the Directorate of Air Requirements on July 21, 2006, where he served as project director for the Airlift Capability Projects Strategic (C-17 Globemaster III) and Tactical (CC-130J Super Hercules), and Fixed-Wing Search and Rescue (CC-127J Spartan), working under Lieutenant General Angus Watt at this posting. In January 2009 he was posted to the Canadian Forces Language School in Gatineau, Quebec, for a six-month period of French language training, during which he was promoted to colonel by recommendation of the now-retired Watt.

On July 15, 2009, Williams was sworn in as the Wing Commander at CFB Trenton by the outgoing Wing Commander Brigadier General Michael Hood. CFB Trenton is Canada's busiest military airbase and a hub of support for overseas military operations. Located in Trenton, Ontario, the base also functioned as the point of arrival for the bodies of all Canadian Forces personnel killed in Afghanistan, and the starting point for funeral processions along the "Highway of Heroes" whence their bodies were taken to Toronto for autopsy.

Williams was regarded as a model military officer over the course of his 23-year career. He had flown Queen Elizabeth II and Prince Philip, Duke of Edinburgh, the Governor General of Canada, the Prime Minister of Canada and many other dignitaries across Canada and overseas in Canadian Forces VIP aircraft.

== Criminal proceedings ==
=== Investigation leading to arrest ===
On January 28, 2010, Jessica Lloyd, aged 27, disappeared from her home in Belleville, Ontario. Investigators identified distinctive tire tracks left in the snow along the north tree line of her property, approximately 100 metres (330 ft) north of her home. One week after her disappearance, the Ontario Provincial Police (OPP) conducted an extensive canvassing of all motorists using the highway near her home from 7:00 p.m. on February 4, 2010, to 6:00 a.m. the next morning, looking for the tire treads. Williams was driving his Nissan Pathfinder that day—‌rather than the BMW he usually drove—‌and an officer noticed the resemblance of his tire treads. These were subsequently matched to the treads near Lloyd's home.

On February 7, 2010, Williams was at his newly built residence in the Ottawa suburb of Westboro, where his wife lived full-time and he lived part-time, when he was called by the Ottawa Police Service and asked to come in for questioning.

=== Interview and confession ===
At 3:00 p.m. on February 7, Williams was interrogated at police headquarters by OPP Detective Sergeant James Smyth. By 7:45 p.m., after having been presented with the tire tread and shoe impression evidence linking him to Lloyd's disappearance, Williams began confessing to his crimes. He disclosed his role in dozens of crimes, including multiple acts of breaking and entering and sexual assault, in and around Tweed and Orleans, Ontario, at locations close to property owned by Williams and his wife. He also disclosed where police could find evidence hidden inside his Ottawa home, including hidden keepsakes, photographs taken of his victims and of himself posing in their underwear, video files of his assaults and murders, and other evidence. Williams then identified on a map where he disposed of Lloyd's body, leading them to the location early the next morning.

=== Charges ===
Along with the murder charges, Williams was charged with breaking and entering, forcible confinement and the sexual assault of two other women in connection with two separate home invasions near Tweed, which occurred in September 2009. According to reports, the women had been bound in their homes and Williams had taken photos of them. He was also charged in the death of Corporal Marie-France Comeau, a 37-year-old military traffic technician based at CFB Trenton, who had been found dead inside her home in late November 2009.

Williams was remanded into custody on February 8, 2010. The Canadian Forces announced that day that an interim commander would soon be appointed to replace him (Dave Cochrane took over eleven days later) and removed his biography from the Department of National Defence website the following day.

Hours after the announcement of Williams' arrest, police services across the country reopened unsolved homicide cases involving young women in areas where he had previously been stationed. According to news reports, police began looking at other unsolved cases based on a full statement that Williams gave to police. In addition to the four primary incidents, the investigation included probes into 48 cases of theft of women's underwear dating back to 2006. Inside his Ottawa home, police discovered stolen lingerie that was neatly stored, catalogued and concealed. A week after Williams' arrest, investigators reported that, along with hidden keepsakes and other evidence found in his home, they had matched a print from one of the homicide scenes to his boot.

In April 2010, Williams was placed on suicide watch at Quinte Detention Centre in Napanee, Ontario after he tried to kill himself by wedging a stuffed cardboard toilet paper roll down his throat.

=== Court proceedings and trial ===
Williams appeared before the Ontario Court of Justice in Belleville via video link from the Quinte Detention Centre on July 22, 2010, where his next court appearance was set for August 26. Again via video link, Williams waived his right to a preliminary inquiry and thus had his next appearance scheduled at the Ontario Superior Court of Justice for October 7, 2010. Williams' lawyer stated then that his client would plead guilty to all charges filed against him.

On October 18, 2010, Williams pleaded guilty to all charges. On the first day of Williams' trial and guilty plea, details emerged of other sexual assaults he committed, including that of a new mother who was woken with a blow to the head while she and her baby were asleep in her house.

The first day of trial revealed that Williams also had pedophilic tendencies, stealing underwear of girls as young as nine years old. He made 82 fetish-related home invasions and attempted break-ins between September 2007 and November 2009.

Williams had progressed from break-ins, to sexual assaults with no penetration, to finally rape and murder. He had kept detailed track of police reports of the crimes he was committing, logged his crimes, kept photos and videos, and had even left notes and messages for his victims. In a break-in into the bedroom of a 12-year-old girl, he left a message on her computer saying: "Merci" ("Thank you" in French). He had taken thousands of pictures of his crimes, and had kept the photos on his computer. Crown Attorney Robert Morrison presented numerous pictures of Williams dressed in the various pieces of underwear and bras he had stolen, frequently masturbating while lying on the beds of his victims.

Some of the photos presented on the first day of his trial were published in several newspapers. As some newspapers explained, although troubling, the photos were published because they capture the essence of the crimes of Williams and show the true nature of his crimes. Among the news media that published some of the released photographs were The Montreal Gazette and The Toronto Star.

Ontario Superior Court Justice Robert F. Scott sentenced Williams on October 22, 2010, to two concurrent terms of life imprisonment, with no consideration of parole for 25 years.

After his conviction the Governor General of Canada, David Johnston, revoked Williams' commission and expelled him from the armed forces. Williams was stripped of his rank of Colonel in the Royal Canadian Air Force as well as his military honours (the South-West Asia Service Medal with Afghanistan clasp, and the Canadian Forces' Decoration (CD) with one clasp). He was allowed to keep his military pension equal to $60,000 CAD per year as terminating it would require an act of parliament. After being returned to the Forces, his uniform was burned, his medals were cut into pieces, and his commission scroll (the instrument of his commission) was shredded, actions similar to the components of a military degradation. His vehicle, a Nissan Pathfinder, was similarly crushed and scrapped.

Williams was initially incarcerated at Kingston Penitentiary, in the prison's segregation unit. After the prison began the process of closing, he was moved to the Port-Cartier Institution, a maximum-security prison in Port-Cartier, Quebec.

On May 10, 2012, the Canadian Forces announced that it had made a "terrible mistake" by publishing a booklet with a photograph containing Williams in the background and ordered 4,000 copies of the book destroyed. The photograph was incidental to the subject matter of the book, but the image was felt to be offensive.

== Personal life ==
On June 1, 1991, Williams married Mary Elizabeth Harriman, who is an associate director of the Heart and Stroke Foundation of Canada.

The couple moved to Orleans, a suburb of Ottawa, in July 2006. By then, Williams had been posted to the Directorate of Air Requirements at the National Defence Headquarters. He served at the Airlift Capability Projects Strategic (CC-177 Globemaster III) and Tactical (CC-130J Hercules J), and Fixed-Wing Search and Rescue.

In December 2010, Williams' wife, Harriman, began the process of filing for divorce, together with a request to have any of her financial and medical information sealed by the court. The divorce was not finalized until years later and Harriman's sealing request was denied in 2014.

== Media portrayals ==
=== Television ===
The Canadian investigative news program The Fifth Estate released an episode titled "Russell Williams: Above Suspicion" on September 24, 2010.

The American investigative news programs 48 Hours aired "Name, Rank and Serial Killer?" on April 9, 2011; and Dateline NBC aired a piece covering the Williams case, titled "Conduct Unbecoming," on August 13, 2015.

Season 4 of the documentary television series I Survived... (originally aired on September 30, 2012) featured one of Williams' victims recounting her story of Williams attacking her in her home.

In November 2017, Dutch film director Ramón Gieling released a documentary, Fatum (Room 216), that uses footage of Williams' 10-hour-long police interrogation.

A television movie adaptation of the Williams case, An Officer and a Murderer, with American actor Gary Cole in the lead role, premiered on the Lifetime Network in the United States on July 21, 2012. A Canadian premiere on The Movie Network, originally planned for August 2012, was cancelled after "reviewing the media coverage" of the US premiere. An Officer and a Murderer eventually aired on Canadian television in August 2013.

His case is also featured in Episode 6, Season 2 of the show Deadly Sins, titled "Commander and Thief".

=== Books ===
- Gibb, David A. (2011). Camouflage Killer: The Shocking Double Life of Colonel Russell Williams. New York: Berkley Books. ISBN 978-0-425-25919-1.
- Appeby, Timothy (2011). A New Kind of Monster: The Secret Life and Shocking True Crimes of an Officer . . . and a Murderer. Crown Publishing Group. ISBN 9780307888730.

J. K. Rowling has stated that the serial killer Dennis Creed in her novel Troubled Blood was based on Williams and Jerry Brudos.

== See also ==
- List of serial killers by country
- Sexual assault in the Canadian Forces
- Mitsero murders
- Ronald Gray
- Nidal Hasan

Military offices
Preceded by M Hood	Wing Commander of No. 8 Wing at CFB Trenton; July 2009–February 2010	Succeeded by D B Cochrane
