= Deaths at Deepcut army barracks =

Series of deaths at a British Army camp

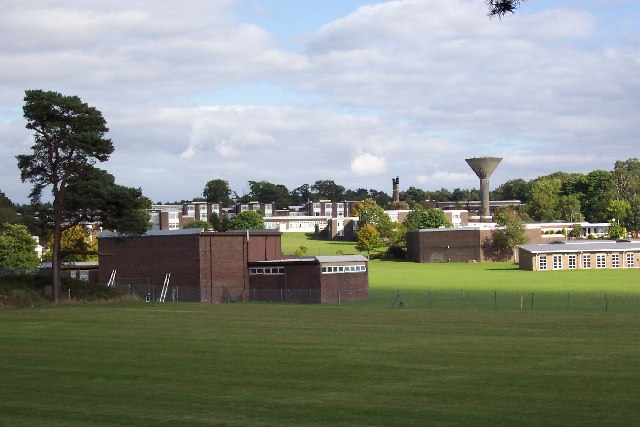
Deepcut army camp, showing many of the main buildings and some of the surrounding landscape.

The deaths at Deepcut Barracks is a series of incidents that took place involving the deaths in obscure circumstances of five British Army trainee soldiers at the Princess Royal Barracks, Deepcut in the county of Surrey, between 1995 and 2002.

The most recent inquests took place at Woking Coroners Court from 2016 to 2019. General Lord Dannatt, a former Chief of the General Staff, in 2016 stated on BBC Newsnight to Emily Maitlis that it was his view that "there should be a public inquiry into the Deepcut Barracks deaths which would be practical and reasonable". A fourth inquest for one of the recruits, James Collinson, initially due in 2020-21, was halted in 2019. His death remains a mystery and an open verdict.

In June 2021, it was revealed on BBC Newsnight that a fifth recruit, Anthony Bartlett, had died at the barracks in July 2001 from an alleged drug overdose.

The original legal investigations concluded that the fatal shootings were self-inflicted. However the circumstances around the deaths and the fact the recruits died in similar circumstances at the same facility, in a comparatively limited period of time, drew substantial media attention and became an extended legal contest between the families of the trainee soldiers concerned and the legal authorities involved as to what had actually occurred. This culminated in the original inquests being repeated, in one case 20 years after the first inquest was conducted.

This lengthy legal contest compelled Surrey Police authorities to investigate further and created a pressure to reveal camp life and its organisation for recruits. The details that emerged over nearly two decades of Police and media investigation, interviews with recruits, television documentaries, and a legal review, illustrated a plethora of changes required for the Army, especially the Royal Logistic Corps, to make changes to how it recruited and treated military trainees. Senior army officers presided over a 'catastrophic' failure in their duty of care towards recruits, an influential Commons committee revealed in 2005.

== Background ==
The trainees were in Phase 2 of the British Army's training syllabus with its Royal Logistic Corps at the Princess Royal Barracks, Deepcut, in Surrey, when they lost their lives through rifle-fire in a series of similar incidents over a six-year period from 1995-2002.

== The trainees ==
The four deaths were:

- On 9 June 1995, Private Sean Benton (20 years of age), from Hastings, East Sussex, England, died from five bullet wounds in his chest after going on an unauthorized lone patrol of the Barracks' perimeter.
- On 27 November 1995, Private Cheryl James (18) from Froncysyllte, Llangollen, Wales, died from a single bullet wound in her head, her body was found in a wood not far from her abandoned guard post.
- On 17 September 2001, Private Geoff Gray (17) from Seaham, County Durham, England, died from two gunshot wounds in his head whilst on guard duty, having left colleagues to carry out a lone prowler patrol in contravention of the routine Barracks' guard-duty procedure.
- On 23 March 2002, Private James Collinson (17) from Perth, Scotland, died from a single gunshot wound in his head whilst performing guard duty, his body being found near the Barracks' perimeter fence.

== First inquests ==
In the original public inquests, held after each individual death, the Coroners' accepted investigations by the Royal Military Police and Surrey Police, and concluded one of suicide in the case of one of the recruits (Sean Benton), with the other three deaths receiving open verdicts.

Over the course of several years the families of the trainees challenged the original investigations and began a sustained legal campaign to have the circumstances of the deaths publicly re-examined. The British press also gathered further accounts from other recruit soldiers who had been at the barracks at the time the shootings occurred, uncovering a disturbing picture of abuse of trainees in the facility by elements among its training staff, and criticised the original investigations into the incidents for a lack of a forensic examination of evidence. Parliamentary criticism followed and a reconsideration of the scope of the investigations and scrutiny of training within the Ministry of Defence.

A later review/re-investigation by Surrey Police treated the four deaths as potentially related. An investigation consequent to this finding, also by Surrey Police, identified a number of failures of the Army's duty of care at the barracks, leaving the opportunity and motive for suicide available. Its findings were rejected by most members of the families. The findings led to media and families' criticism of the army investigations of the deaths over record keeping, transparency and particularly maintenance of evidence and forensic material.

== Questions in Parliament ==
After questions in the House of Commons during 2003 and 2004, three Lords asked the government for a public inquiry in November 2004. A response was issued through its whip in the Lords Baroness Crawley:

My Lords, the Government are not so far convinced that a public inquiry will achieve additional information to that already achieved through all the various police, Army and coroner investigations and inquiries. They have already reported. However, as my noble friend said in his supplementary question, a further review by a fully independent figure was announced by the Minister of State for the Armed Forces in the House of Commons. The Government are not complacent on these matters.

The Ministry of Defence in 2004 expanded its relationship with the 'Adult Learning Inspectorate' to provide independent oversight of all British Armed forces training.

== Blake Report ==
In December 2004 a military law QC, Nicholas Blake of Matrix Chambers, was commissioned by the Ministry of Defence to independently review the cases with the voluntary co-operation of involved parties. In March 2006 he published a 397-page report entitled 'The Deepcut Review' with his findings, which concluded that it was probable that the deaths were self-inflicted but criticised a number of aspects of the Deepcut Barracks training centre at the time of the deaths, which the Report suggested could be construed as having played a role in the suicides.

The points identified by the report were:

- The training environment at Deepcut causing low morale through poor accommodation, limited recreational facilities, and the balance between privacy and dormitory life.
- Ill-disciplined access to firearms at the barracks.
- Poor supervision of trainees.
- A detrimental culture in the barracks had taken root involving ill-discipline, bullying and unofficial punishments.
- A systemic failure of the means for complaint within the barracks.
- Low quality instructors on the barracks' staff.

A report issued by the Army Board of Inquiry in response to the Blake Report was due to be published in December 2007, but was delayed by the Ministry of Defence until May 2009. On release it supported the Blake Report's findings and returned open verdicts on the deaths of the recruits.

== Press commentary ==
The Deaths at Deepcut Barracks, with their obscure circumstances, with questions being asked as to whether they were suicides or foul play by an unknown third party(ies), have drawn substantial coverage in the British media, both in Fleet Street's tabloid and broadsheet titles, and in television news programmes and documentaries.

=== 2000–2009 ===
In December 2002, the British Broadcasting Corporation's Panorama television current affairs programme broadcast an investigation into the barracks at the time of the deaths, cataloguing an abusive culture towards recruits among elements of the training staff, and naming a particular non-commissioned officer as being a problem in this regard.

In 2009, The Mirror newspaper reported that senior police officers investigating the deaths of the four young soldiers at Deepcut seriously compromised the investigation by briefing army top brass on their findings.

=== 2010–2019 ===
In 2020, articles by journalists Brian Cathcart and Heather Mills critical of the investigations featured in Private Eye, which has been consistently critical of these judgements and supported the families' appeals for further investigation. These criticisms drew on the later investigations to suggest the initial forensic investigations were flawed. Cathcart had also been critical of the treatment of the four cases in the media.

In 2011, Devon and Cornwall Police reviewed Surrey Police's investigations and found the force was aware of a number of theories suggesting specific individuals could have killed the soldiers. However, this line of questioning was never followed up.

In January 2016, prior to the start of a new inquest into the death of Cheryl James, The Independent newspaper revealed a culture of bullying, sexual assaults and rape was claimed to be widespread at Deepcut barracks. Almost 60 allegations of such incidents from 1995 were made to Surrey Police by former recruits but had hitherto escaped public attention.

Following the end of Cheryl James's second inquest Friday 3 June, the same day BBC2 broadcast a documentary at 9pm called, 'Deepcut; The Army's Shame'. The documentary was referred to as 'shocking' and indeed during interviews with former recruits it described a 'malevolent culture' of bullying, violence, attempted suicide, rape, male-rape, threats of murder, and racism. A former NCO, Julia Boulton was one of the few female non-commissioned officers, NCOs, at Deepcut in the mid-90s. She believes the base was out of control and she says of her fellow instructors: "A lot of them were actually put there because nobody else wanted them. It sort of had a bit of a reputation of being a dumping ground to get rid of unwanted NCOs."

One recruit who trained with Cheryl James, was interviewed by ITV News following the conclusion of her second inquest. In the interview the recruit said James had a 'bubbly personality' and her suicide didn't 'add up'. He consequently said life at the camp was 'chaotic' and there was 'no structure'. He was the same recruit that appeared on BBC2's documentary and described how he was abused by an instructor and knocked unconscious by a broom handle.

In July the same year, another former recruit who had known Sean Benton was interviewed live on BBC News's Victoria Derbyshire programme. During the interview he described an insidious culture of 'bullying and paranoia' and described how he and three other recruits locked each other inside cupboards to escape from the regime. The cupboards had to be locked with a padlock from the outside and was the 'only place instructors couldn't access'. Following the interview Des James, father of army recruit Cheryl James said that this interview of Deepcut was another sign that there was a culture of bullying at the camp that, "People are starting to realise something was very wrong there." He said he was still pressing for a public inquiry.

In 2017, it was suggested in the media that detectives investigating the deaths of the four soldiers at Deepcut did not properly consider a list of hypothetical suspects, according to a report.

Following Sean Benton's second inquest in 2018, a judge hit out at “incompetent” police and the “toxic” Army base after ruling that the “troubled rookie soldier blasted himself to death with a machine gun.”

In 2019, the parents of Perth soldier James Collinson who died mysteriously at the Barracks said they will drop their fight for a new judicial inquiry. His death remains a mystery.

== Further inquests ==
=== Cheryl James ===
On 18 July 2014, the High Court of Justice ordered a second inquest into the death of soldier Pte Cheryl James following a judicial review brought by her family. The judge found “an insufficiency of inquiry” into her death. The original inquest, held in 1995 soon after her death, lasted less than one hour and recorded an open verdict. Surrey Police was criticised for its handling of the case, Mr. Justice Thornton stating that it had at first refused full disclosure of the reinvestigation report to Pte James's family. Surrey Police subsequently handed over 44 lever arch files of documents pertaining to the case after being notified that an application for an Order for Disclosure was about to be made against it. The force said it had now voluntarily provided all relevant material to the family – since being first requested to in early 2012 – and what had been disclosed "affords fresh grounds for an inquest". The documents handed over included "important material relating to ballistics, the noise of the gunshot, bullet fragments, the finding of the body, the credibility of some witnesses, and further witnesses". The ruling meant that new inquests were also likely to follow into the deaths of the other three trainee soldiers.

On 15 September 2014, it was announced that the fresh inquest would be conducted by Recorder of London, Brian Barker QC.

In April 2015, it was reported in Private Eye that, "on the force's own admission, it has still only handed over 75% of the material it holds" in relation to Pte Cheryl James and that the force had made legal submissions to the Coroner Mr. Barker to delay the new inquest into her death "indefinitely". Private Eye also commented that Pte James's family, "should not be forced to wait any longer by the machinations of the police force which has let them down so many times before". The BBC reported Pte James’ father, Des James, as saying: "It's insensitive that they're delaying it. It's been really tough for us getting to this point. I made the mistake of relaxing and thinking I could leave it to the legal process." Advocacy group Liberty funded lawyers to act for the family saying the delay would: "have a devastating impact on Mr and Mrs James. They have come so far and made so much progress only to have Surrey Police make this eleventh hour request to delay matters. It is intolerable."

In May 2015, Private Eye reported: "Revelations last week that the ‘yellow’ fragment of bullet recovered from the body of teenager Cheryl James [...] did not appear to match the ‘red’ army issue ammunition raises serious questions about the botched investigations and inquiries over 20 years into the deaths". The report added: "The assumption was always that she had committed suicide, even though there was no evidence to connect the SA80 weapon alongside her body with her death: no fingerprints were collected from the rifle; ammunition from it was inexplicably destroyed; the clothing Cheryl was wearing was never examined forensically; and, crucially, the bullet fragment said to have been collected at post-mortem, which we now know was ‘yellow’ (or brass, rather than copper-coated), had curiously disappeared". The magazine added that there was "material to suggest Cheryl had been the victim of serious harassment and sexual violence", which it said had "scandalously […] remained buried" in Surrey police files despite subsequent reviews of the force's initial investigation by Devon and Cornwall Police and the Blake review. Pte James’ parents argued, through their QC, for their daughter's body to be exhumed in the hope of recovering further bullet fragments. Coroner Mr Barker QC postponed making what he described as the "difficult and unusual" step of ordering an exhumation but rejected the suggestion from Surrey police to delay the inquest and hold it alongside those of the other Deepcut recruits. The coroner announced that there would be a further pre-hearing on Thursday September 10, 2015 and that the full inquest would be held between 1 February and 24 March 2016.

At the September 2015 pre-inquest hearing, the Coroner's Court in Woking was informed that Pte James’ body had been exhumed the previous month and that a post-mortem examination had been carried out by two pathologists, during which metallic fragments were recovered for ballistic analysis. Her family had attended a short reburial service, also in August 2015. The James family's barrister, Alison Foster QC, said that the experts conducting the ballistic analysis "ought not to have a significant connection either with the MoD [Ministry of Defence] or indeed a police force and certainly no connection with Surrey Police" because of what she called a "considerable shadow" over the initial handling of the case.

On 3 June 2016, the appointed Coroner Brian Barker, Q.C. (the Recorder of London), ruled that Pte. James' death was suicide, and that she died as a result of a "self-inflicted shot" which she fired in an "intended and deliberate act". He added: "We have explored as best we can what could be unearthed at this late stage within the legal constraints I am bound by. Clear answers as to why are just not there to be seen." He also found that the general administrative and disciplinary culture at the Deepcut facility at the time of Pte. James' death fell below the standard expected of a British military establishment.

Pte. James' family rejected the suicide finding, her father stating that there was a "gaping hole [in the evidence], and that he [did not] believe the evidence led to this verdict". Additionally, he described Deepcut as a "toxic and horrible place for a young woman", and called for a public inquiry into the culture of the barracks.

Brigadier John Donnelly, Head of the British Army's Personnel Services, on the announcement of the verdict stated that the Army: '... was truly sorry for the level of supervision that trainees had received at Deepcut in 1995'. Surrey Police also issued a statement that 'mistakes had been made' in their original investigation of the incident. General Lord Dannatt, a former Chief of the General Staff, stated to the media that it was his view that there should be a public inquiry into the Deepcut Barracks deaths. The current head General Sir Nick Carter also stated in press interviews that: "If that’s the best method of getting to the heart of the matter, then I guess that should be the way that we go."

=== Sean Benton ===
On 14 October 2016 Mr Justice Collins ruled a new inquest could take place into the death of Pte. Sean Benton as fresh evidence had cast "some doubt" over the conclusion of the first hearing in 1995.

At a pre-inquest hearing at the Old Bailey on 16 Jun 2017, a 10-point list was presented widening the scope to look at all the circumstances of Pte. Benton's death. It included the details of how he died and whether there was “any third-party action” involved in the death.

The second inquest commenced on 30 January 2018, concluding 6 months later. On 18 July 2018 appointed Coroner Peter Rook, Q.C., ruled that Pte. Benton had committed suicide, caused by multiple self-inflicted gunshots to the chest. The Coroner criticised Surrey Police's original investigation into the death, and stated that the initial investigation by the Royal Military Police was also inadequate, including a lack of witnesses testimony, no fingerprints having been taken, and no evidence having been provided concerning Pte. Benton's life at the barracks. He also described what had been revealed by the second inquest's investigations as a 'toxic culture' that existed at the time of Pte. Benton's death at the barracks, and noted that Pte. Benton was frequently the recipient of harsh treatment. Benton’s sister, Tracy Lewis, told the Coroner that shortly before he died he had complained of being pushed out of a window at the barracks, as well as being “shackled and forced to parade around a canteen”.

One witness recalled Sean Benton, who was from Hastings in East Sussex, being punched, lying helpless on the ground, facing verbal abuse and being "humiliated", her statement showed. In one excerpt read out at Woking Coroner's Court, the witness said Pte Benton was punched in the stomach by Cpl Martin Holder, falling to the ground. Another witness described how they had spoken to Sean Benton as they were both going on guard duty in June 1995. She told the inquest he had been picked on quite severely. Another witness described the culture of Deepcut and how he had tried to block out memories of the camp since leaving the Army. The same witness said Sean was 'very nervous' as a result of bullying.

Army sergeant Andrew Gavaghan, also cited at the inquest of Cheryl James for ordering another recruit to have sex which he denied, was accused of bullying recruits at Deepcut but told the Coroner he would do things differently now. A commanding officer criticised Gavaghan's natural style of leadership and said he was "lacking bite" with young soldiers, the Court heard. Mr Gavaghan said he used to suggest jokingly to soldiers he had a "twin brother" who did the shouting, but another witness said recruits called him a "psychopath". Indeed other recruits referred to Gavaghan as a 'madhead', and 'completely unhinged'. Some recruits were so frightened they locked each other in cupboards to escape from instructors. Another recruit recalls Gavaghan kicking her in the small of the back and said he was “normally quite venomous”, and did not like women in general and that all the male soldiers were afraid of him. However a former officer disagreed and described Gavaghan as a “firm troop sergeant”. She did not see him scream and shout or lose control with the trainees or make them hide in fear.

Another former trainee described sharing a room with Sean Benton and said he was once attacked by other trainees - one in a Halloween mask - before he heard one say: "We've got the wrong bloody bastard, where is he?". And on one occasion a hot iron was put under his duvet, but he did not report it in case he was targeted too, he added. The former soldier said he came forward during the inquest having been ignored by Surrey Police when he contacted the force three times in 2002.

Pte. Benton's family accepted the suicide verdict, but criticised Surrey Police and the Army. The family asked Surrey Police to open a criminal investigation because of multiple examples of testimony given during the inquest that described bullying and violence at the Deepcut facility. Surrey Police opened a criminal investigations into the circumstances which led to the death of Sean Benton who was allegedly kicked and punched by an instructor 'days before his suicide'. This investigation is currently in progress as of 2020. Following the end of his inquest in July 2018 Sean Benton's sister, Tracy Lewis, stated to the press outside Woking Coroner's Court that: "Sean was a victim in a nasty game".

Following the Coroner's verdict, Brigadier Christopher Coles, Head of Army Personnel Services, apologised to the Benton family and accepted that there had been a failure to give Pte. Benton welfare support during his time in the barracks.

=== Geoff Gray ===
In March 2015, the family of Pte. Geoff Gray demanded a fresh inquest after receiving 16,000 pages of new evidence from Surrey Police. At the original inquest, which lasted four hours, only 20 pages of evidence had been presented. Gray's father told the Daily Mirror: "I can’t go into what I’ve seen in the new pages, but it is all stuff that was not seen by the coroner at the original inquest into Geoff’s death. […] We were very, very naive. We should have had representation. It is pretty definite that we will be making an application to have a new inquest." The additional material was released following a legal request from counsel representing his family. The force said that it had "agreed to this request on a voluntary basis" adding that "Surrey Police is not reinvestigating the deaths, but is committed to providing disclosure to the families through their legal teams and will provide the appropriate support for any potential inquests in the future."

On 28 November 2017, Lord Justice Bean and two other judges sitting at the High Court of Justice ruled it was "necessary or desirable in the interests of justice" for a fresh inquest to be held into the death of Pte Geoff Gray. They ordered the inquest in 2002 should be quashed with its verdict and findings. Justice Bean said the scope of the new inquest "and the issue of whether the coroner should, or should not, sit with a jury, should be a matter for the coroner".

20 July 2018 at a pre-inquest hearing at the Old Bailey it was reported that Private Gray could have been shot by another trainee at the barracks. John Cooper QC representing Geoff Gray's family told the hearing the main issue was "simply, who pulled the trigger". Mr Cooper also added that there was evidence of "systemic failings" at Deepcut and allegations of a "lack of procedure and lack of protection for these young recruits".

The second inquest into the circumstances of the death of Pte. Gray began on 26 February 2019 at Woking Coroner's Court. Mr. Peter Rook, Q.C., was appointed as the officiating Coroner, the same judge who presided over Pte. Benton's second inquest 12 months earlier. Again there was to be no jury. At the start of the second inquest the Ministry of Defence denied claims that key internal reports cataloguing life at Deepcut Barracks would not be submitted as evidence. An anonymous letter sent to Mr. John Cooper QC, the Gray family's barrister, made a series of claims about how the inquest would operate. The letter, which was apparently written by someone with detailed knowledge of previous inquests into the deaths of recruits at Deepcut, stated: “It has been made clear that other source documents detailing the situation in 2001-03 are not to be part of the new evidence regarding the Gray statement for the upcoming inquest, and that the statement structure as set out for Benton is to be maintained.”

The letter further stated that the British Army intended to withhold from the new inquest material in its possession contemporaneous with Gray's death that showed that its senior command echelon responsible for the external supervision of the Princess Royal Barracks, Deepcut, had been repeatedly notified that it was in a state of disciplinary disorder, but had failed to correct the situation. The Ministry of Defence's legal representatives issued a statement that there was no truth in the anonymous letter's allegations.

On 20 June 2019 Coroner Peter Rook, Q.C., at Woking Coroner's Court ruled that the original investigation into the circumstances of Pte. Gray's death had been "cursory, and carried out with a closed mind" by the authorities responsible, and that Pte. Gray's parents were right to have sought a second inquest, and should not have been placed in the situation of being required to seek it through the original inquest's inadequacies. He went on to rule that, according to the evidence he had examined Pte. Gray had committed suicide, stating that he had created an opportunity for himself to be alone with a rifle, and "I am sure that he administered the shots himself, and intended to end his life". The court had not enquired as to Pte. Gray's motivation for the act, beyond establishing that he appeared content with life in the Army, and there was no evidence of mistreatment towards him within it; the judge also accepted expert evidence that suicides can take place "out of the blue", for no apparent logical reason.

Pte. Gray's family afterwards stated to the press that they were dissatisfied with the verdict which they found illogical, that they had been denied recourse to a jury hearing, and that the court's conclusion had been partly arrived at using unsupported assumptions, and that there were thousands of pages of evidential material on the case created by Surrey Police's investigations that had been unexamined by the second inquest and not made public because of legal restraints. Pte. Gray's mother stated that she wanted a full public inquiry into the circumstances of the serial recruit deaths at Deepcut Barracks between 1995-2002.

On the announcement of the verdict, Brigadier Coles, Head of the British Army's Personnel Services, stated that "The Army deeply regrets Pte. Gray's death", and that reforms to procedures relating to investigations of such events and supervision of recruit soldiers in relation to firearms had been made in consequence, he also stated that the verdict laid to rest rumours about third party involvement in the death, and that the judgement had established that "such speculation was groundless".

=== James Collinson ===
The mother of Pte. James Collinson as of 2018 was reported as seeking a new inquest into the circumstances of his death at Deepcut barracks. In July 2019 it was reported that the parents of Pte. Collinson had abandoned their campaign for a new inquest into the circumstances of his death, stating that having observed what the other families had been through in the second inquests they didn't have the emotional or physical strength to submit themselves to the same process. They further stated that they supported calls from the other families for a public enquiry into the condition of Deepcut Barracks in the 1995-2002 period, requesting that it should examine why it took the serial violent deaths of four recruits before the authorities admitted that there was something seriously wrong at the facility.

== Anthony Bartlett ==
In June 2021, it was revealed that a fifth recruit, Pte Anthony Bartlett, had died at the barracks in July 2001 from an overdose of prescription painkillers; the BBC reported that "a former detective who investigated the later deaths at Deepcut [retired Det Ch Insp Colin Sutton] said it was 'staggering' he was not told about it".

== Cultural references ==
The series of deaths were used as the basis of a verbatim stage play entitled Deep Cut by Philip Ralph, which premiered at the Edinburgh Festival Fringe in 2008, before a run at the Tricycle Theatre in London the following year. Another play based upon the events, focusing on the death of Pte. Gray, entitled Geoff Dead: Disco for Sale, written by Fiona Evans, was performed in 2008 at Live Theatre in Newcastle-upon-Tyne.

== See also ==
- Princess Royal Barracks, Deepcut
- Suicide in the military
