= William Burr Cochran =

United States Army general

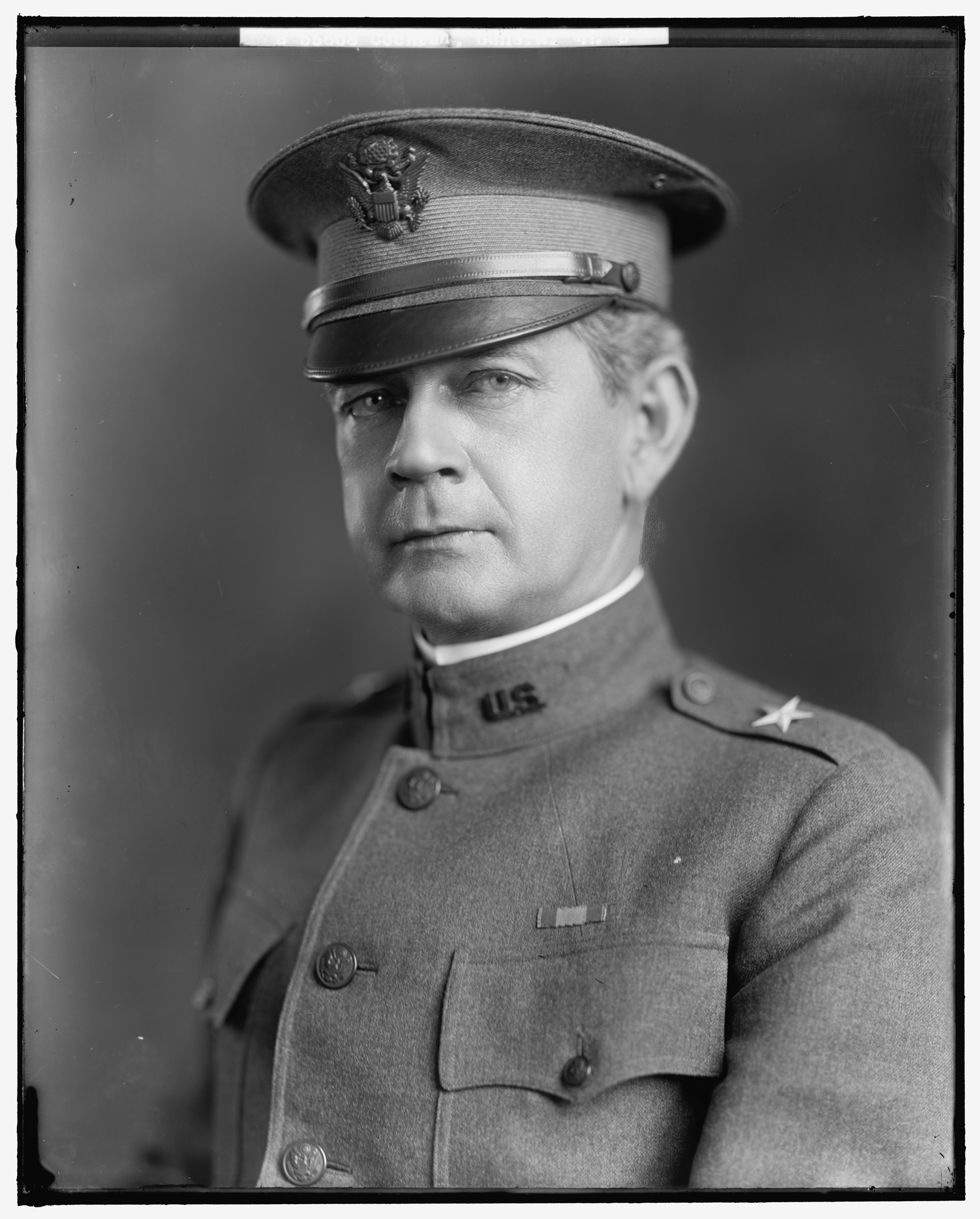
- Born: July 9, 1863
- Died: July 2, 1931 (aged 67)

William Burr Cochran (July 9, 1863 – July 2, 1931) was an American Army Brigadier general during World War I.

== Early life ==
Cochran was born to John Henry and Charlotte Cochran in Middleburg, Virginia. He attended the Virginia Military Institute, graduating with the class of 1888.

== Career ==
Cochran enlisted in the Fifth Infantry on September 11, 1892. He received a commission as a second lieutenant on March 28, 1896.

He served during the Spanish–American War.

== Personal life ==
He was a member of the Phi Delta Theta fraternity.

== Death and legacy ==
Cochran died on July 2, 1931, and is buried in Arlington National Cemetery. His papers are held by the Archives of Virginia Military Institute.
