= Sexual assault in the Canadian Forces =

Sexual assault in Canada's military

Sexual assault in the Canadian Armed Forces has been a pervasive issue affecting women, youth, and men in the Canadian Forces and Canadian Cadet Organizations. Canadian Forces sexual assault cases have been extensively reported in national Canadian news media. The scope and depth of the sexual assault problem first came to light in 1998, when Maclean's magazine broke the story. Individual cases continued to be reported. The issue became a national focus again when Maclean's magazine published another exposé exploring the extent of rape culture in Canada's military.

== Context ==
Sexual misconduct, including harassment and assault, is a pervasive problem in militaries worldwide. It affects women disproportionately, particularly younger women and girls. Other groups at high risk include partners of personnel, child cadets, and military detainees.

While prevalence varies by country, military branch, and other factors, official statistics from Canada, the UK, and the US indicate that between a quarter and a third of military women in these countries are sexually harassed at work at least once each year. Military training settings are characterised by a particularly high level of sexual harassment and assault relative to both the civilian population and other military settings. Research further shows an increase in perpetration during and after deployment on military operations.

== Prevalence ==
=== Canadian armed forces ===
Through Canada's Access to Information Act, it was revealed that Canadian Military Police have received between 134 and 201 sexual assault complaints every year since the year 2000, averaging to 178 per year. Given that the Canadian Armed Forces has 119,000 personnel (military and civilian), this represents a reported rate of 1.5 incidents per 1000. In 2014, the rate of self-reported sexual assault in the whole of Canada was 22 incidents per 1000. A 2012 survey showed that women, minorities, and First Nations suffered disproportionate levels of sexual and personal harassment in the Canadian Forces.

The Canadian Forces claims that it takes sexual assault and abuse seriously.

It has been further reported that one in thirteen women in the Canadian Forces has been sexually assaulted in connection with their military employment.

High-profile sexual assaults by Canadian Forces offenders, like the case of Colonel Russell Williams have brought further attention to the issue in Canada.

In some cases, members charged with sexual assault have been retained on active service by the Canadian Forces, and placed on administrative duties. This issue was brought about in May 1998 by a dozen women in Maclean's magazine.

=== Canadian cadet organizations ===
There have been numerous documented instances where cadets in the care of the Canadian Cadet Organizations have been sexually abused or assaulted. According to MacLean's magazine, one in ten reported sexual assaults in the military is against a member of the Royal Canadian Army Cadets. Some of these incidents have come to light years after the abuse occurred. Cadets Canada has a program called Positive Social Relations for Youth intended to stop future offences.

According to Vice Magazine, the Royal Canadian Army Cadets is "plagued with sexual abuse allegations".

== 2014 External sexual assault review and later ==
In 2014, the Government of Canada announced an external review of the sexual assault crisis within Canada's military. The Government named former Supreme Court of Canada Justice Marie Deschamps to conduct the review. The review has received international coverage.

In 2015, the military launched Operation Honour to combat sexual assault and misconduct in its ranks. The military launched reviews in response to an extensive 2017 Globe and Mail investigation on problems with Canadian sexual assault cases deemed unfounded. In September 2018, after a review of 179 cases closed as unfounded, 23 cases were re-opened. Another 43 were re-classified to better reflect the actual findings of the investigations.

== Notable cases ==
Russell Williams, a colonel in the Royal Canadian Air Force, progressed from breaking into homes, sexual assault with no penetration, to rape and murder. He was charged with breaking and entering, forcible confinement, and the sexual assault of two women in connection with two separate home invasions near Tweed, Ontario in September 2009. Williams was also charged in the death of Corporal Marie-France Comeau, a 37-year-old military traffic technician based at CFB Trenton, who had been found dead inside her home in late November 2009. He was sentenced on 22 October 2010 to two concurrent terms of life imprisonment, with no consideration of parole for 25 years. He is housed in a maximum-security prison in Port-Cartier, Quebec.

== See also ==
- Sexual harassment
- Wartime sexual violence
- Military sexual trauma
- Sexual misconduct in the British military
- Sexual assault in the United States military
- Women in the military
- Russell Williams (criminal)
