= Dave Cochrane (Canadian Forces officer) =

Brigadier-General David Bruce Cochrane, MSM, CD is a Royal Canadian Air Force officer.

Col. Cochrane assumed command of CFB Trenton, as well as the primary lodger unit for the base, 8 Wing, on February 19, 2010, eleven days after his predecessor, Russell Williams, was formally charged under the Criminal Code with two counts of first-degree murder along with two counts of forcible confinement and two counts of break and enter and sexual assault.

Col. Cochrane graduated from Royal Military College of Canada in 1986 with a degree in mechanical engineering, and later qualified as a navigator. In 2009, he deployed overseas for six months and served in the War in Afghanistan as commanding officer of Theatre Support Element Roto 8.

Colonel Dave Cochrane was promoted to the Rank of Brigadier-General in Royal Canadian Air Force on 11 February 2015.

He transferred command of CFB Trenton in August 2011. He graduated from the year-long Australian Defence College, Centre for Defence and Strategic Studies Course. Brigadier-General Cochrane assumed the position of Senior Advisor to the National Security Advisor in the Privy Council Office in Ottawa in early 2013. Promoted to Brigadier-General in 2015, he assumed the position of Commander 2 Canadian Air Division in Winnipeg overseeing individual training and education for RCAF officers and non-commissioned members (NCMs). was appointed to the command of 2 Canadian Air Division in Winnipeg.

In summer 2018, BGen Cochrane was appointed Commander, National Cadet and Junior Canadian Ranger Support Group in Ottawa, succeeding BGen Kelly Woiden.

In 2020, BGen Cochrane retired from service.

== Honours and decorations ==
Brig. Gen. Dave Cochrane Has Been Awarded the Following Honours and Decorations During His Military Career.

Ribbon	Description	Notes
	Meritorious Service Medal (MSM)	Decoration awarded on 26 April 2011; Military division; With Clasp Awarded 17 May 2012
	Gulf and Kuwait Medal	with Clasp
	General Campaign Star	South West Asia Ribbon; With "ISAF" Clasp
	Special Service Medal	with NATO-OTAN Clasp
	Canadian Peacekeeping Service Medal	
	United Nations Special Service Medal	90 Days on UN Peacekeeping Mission
	NATO Medal for the former Yugoslavia	with FORMER YUGOSLAVIA clasp
	Canadian Forces' Decoration	with one Clasp for 22 years of services

- Brig. Gen. Dave Cochrane has earned the Canadian Forces Air Combat Systems Officer (ACSO) Wings.

Military offices
Preceded by Russell Williams	Wing Commander of No. 8 Wing at CFB Trenton; February 2010 - August 2011	Succeeded by Sean Friday
Preceded by Martin Galvin	Commander 2 Canadian Air Division at CFB Winnipeg; 2015 - 2018	Succeeded by Mario Leblanc
Preceded by Kelly Woiden	Commander National Cadet and Junior Canadian Rangers Support Group; 2018 - 2020	Succeeded by Josée Kurtz
