= Suicide in the military =

US army suicide prevention poster, 2012

Suicide in the military is the act of ending one's life during or after a career in the armed forces. While suicide rates in military organizations vary internationally, official statistics in several countries show a consistently higher risk in certain subgroups.

In the United Kingdom, young serving personnel are markedly more likely than older personnel and same-age civilians to end their lives. The risk among former military personnel is higher than among either serving personnel or the general population, according to research in Australia, Canada, the UK, and the United States. The risk is particularly marked among veterans who joined up at a young age.

Contrary to popular belief, deployment to a war zone has not been associated with an increased risk of suicide overall, according to research in Canada, Denmark, the UK, and the US. Participating in, or witnessing killing and wounding, however, can increase the risk. A study of the US army found that the career stage carrying the greatest suicide risk was not deployment, but initial military training, as a time of disorientation and stress.

Individuals most at risk of suicide during or after a military career include those who had a troubled childhood; are of low rank; have close-combat roles in war; and/or leave service soon after joining. Certain other known risk factors for suicide are common in military life, including depression, posttraumatic stress disorder, alcohol misuse, bullying and sexual harassment. Variations in the suicide rate in military populations may also signify changes in the prevalence of related mental health problems, such as anxiety, depression, and histories of self-harm.

A 2021 report from the Costs of War Project estimated that over 4 times as many active duty personnel and veterans of post-9/11 wars died by suicide than service members killed in post-9/11 war operations.

Official data from the Israeli army also shows that suicides among soldiers have increased significantly since the start of the Gaza War on October 7, 2023. The Haaretz newspaper announced that about 60 soldiers have lost their lives by suicide since that date.

== Incidence ==
Research from Australia, Canada, the UK, and the US indicates that suicide is a pervasive problem in military life, particularly after personnel leave, and that the youngest are most affected.

=== Serving personnel ===
In countries where data are collected, the rate of suicide among serving armed forces personnel varies widely. The table below presents rates among serving male personnel in the regular armed forces (i.e. excluding reserve forces) of four countries, with comparisons to the general population.

Suicides among serving regular male armed forces personnel in selected countries (with comparison to male general population matched for age)
| | Date range | Crude rate per 100,000 | Risk relative to general population |
|---|---|---|---|
| Australia | 2002–2019 | 11 | -51% |
| Canada | 2015–2019 | 25 | +122% |
| UK | 2002–2021 | 8 | -57% |
| US | 2020 | 32 | ≈0 |

Since most military personnel are male and suicide is a rare event, it is not usually possible to calculate a statistically significant rate among female personnel. The large military of the US is an exception, where the suicide rate among serving female personnel in 2020 was 12 per 100,000.

=== Former personnel ===
Typically, former personnel are more likely than serving personnel to end their lives. The table below shows suicide rates among ex-armed forces personnel for three countries.

Suicides among male former armed forces personnel in selected countries (with comparison to male general population matched for age)
| | Date range | Crude rate per 100,000 | Risk relative to general population |
|---|---|---|---|
| Australia | 2002–2019 | 30 | +24% |
| Canada | 2015–2019 | Not reported | +39% |
| US | 2019 | 33 | +52% |

(The UK Ministry of Defence has announced that it will begin collecting and publishing official statistics on suicides in the ex-armed forces population from 2023.)

Research suggests that the period of maximum risk for those leaving the armed forces is in the years shortly following discharge: within two years in the UK and within four years in Canada.

=== Young personnel and veterans ===
Official statistics from Australia, Canada, the UK, and the US show that younger personnel face increased risks.

In the UK, for example, while the suicide rate among male serving soldiers overall was 57% lower than that in the general population between 2002 and 2021, it was 31% higher among those under 20. The graphs opposite illustrate the elevated risk in this youngest age group.

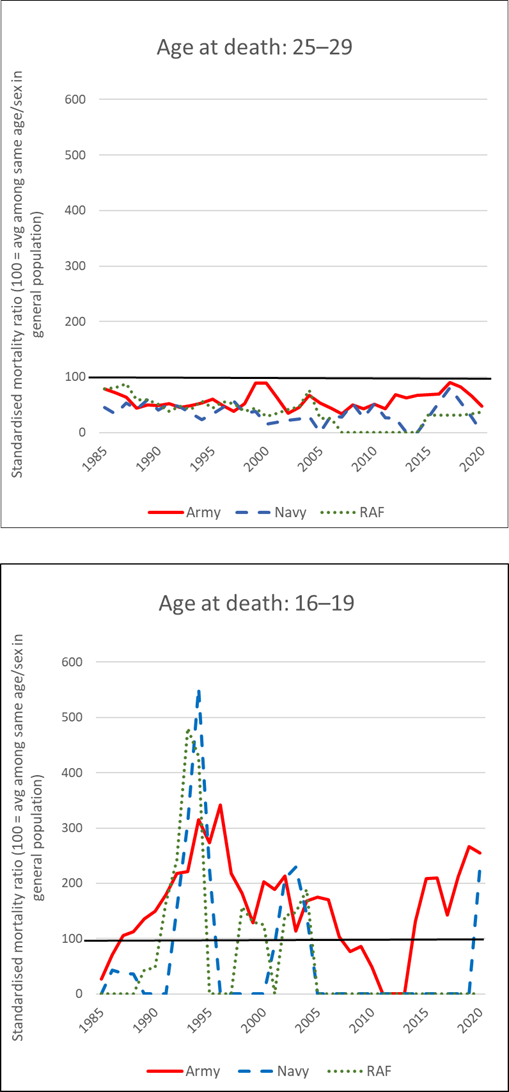
Suicides among males in two age groups (16-19 and 25-29) serving in the regular UK armed forces (coloured lines) relative to the general population (black line), 1985-2020. Source: UK Ministry of Defence

The risk among young former personnel is markedly higher than that among civilians of the same age and to older veterans. In the UK, for example, those who enlist young have been found to face an increased risk of self-harm and suicide after leaving the armed forces, relative both to older personnel and to their civilian peers. Compared with serving personnel of the same age, the suicide rate among young former personnel in the UK has been between two and three times as high, as is also the case in Australia. In both countries and additionally in Canada, the relative risk of suicide among young former personnel is also consistently well above the rate found among civilians of the same age.

The table below shows the rate of suicide among the youngest age groups for which data are collected in three countries (note varying date ranges).

Suicides among young male former armed forces personnel in selected countries (with comparison to male serving personnel and male general population, both matched for age)
| | Date range | Age group | Former personnel in age group: suicide rate per 100,000 | Serving personnel in age group: suicide rate per 100,000 | Former personnel: Suicide risk relative to general population |
|---|---|---|---|---|---|
| Australia | 2002–2019 | Under 30 | 34 | 13 | +68% |
| Canada | 1976–2014 | Under 25 | Not reported | Not reported | +152% |
| UK | 1996–2005 | 16–19 | 30 | 17 | +193% |
| US | 2019 | 18–34 | 51 | Not reported | Not reported |

== At-risk individuals and groups ==
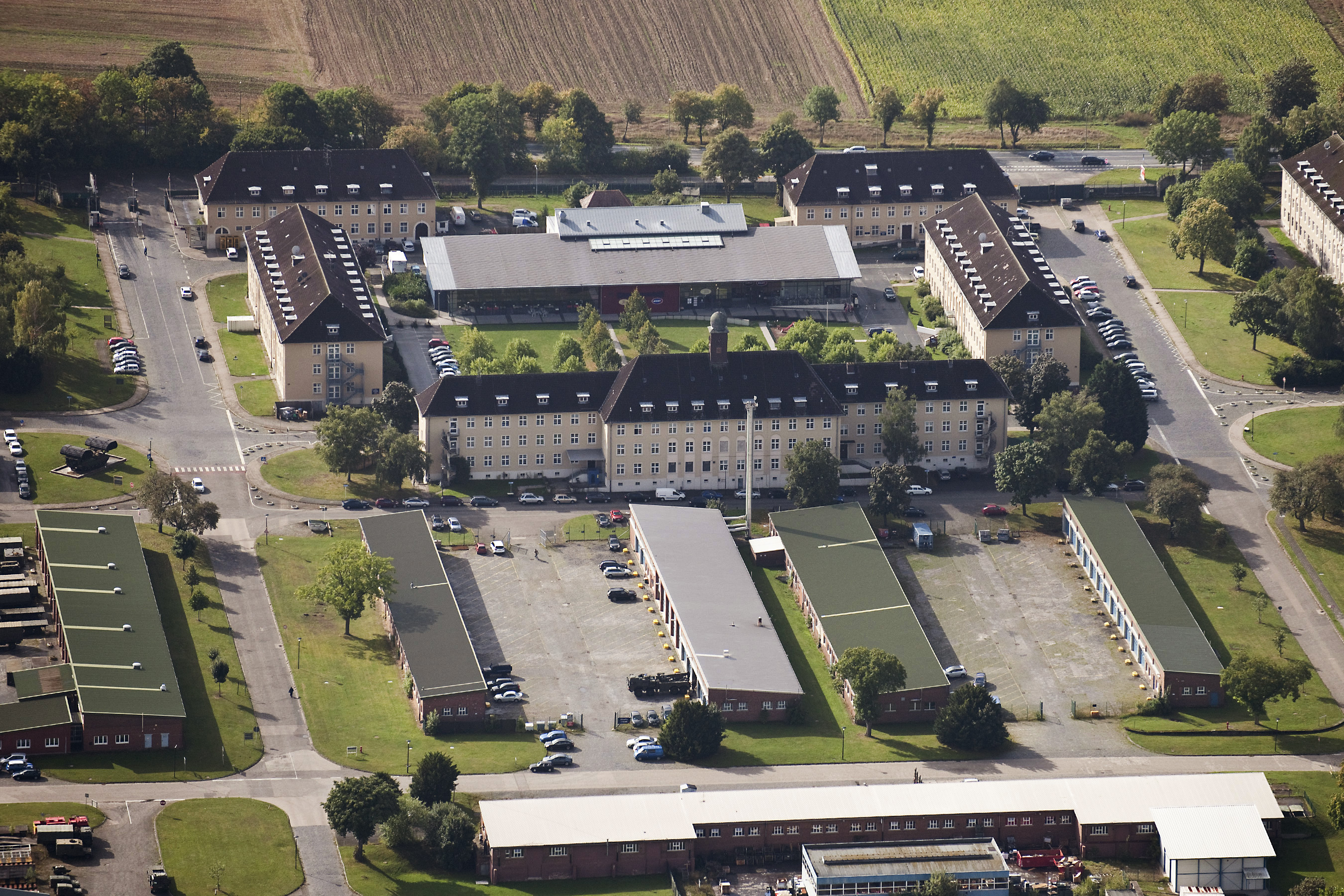
British army base at Sennelager, Germany, where Cpl Anne-Marie Ellement reported that two of her colleagues had raped her in 2009. The coroner concluded that the rape and subsequent bullying by the army contributed to her suicide two years later.

Individuals with experiences of distress are more susceptible to suicide. Certain such experiences are typically more common in the armed forces than in civilian life, according to research in various countries, including:

- Anxiety, depression, and posttraumatic stress disorder;
- Relationship breakdown;
- Alcohol misuse and substance misuse;
- Bullying;
- Sexual harassment.

Similarly, research has found that suicide risk if higher in certain military subgroups than others. In addition to those of young age, higher risk is conferred to serving and former personnel who are:

- In the army (versus navy and air force);
- Of low rank;
- In close-combat roles such as the infantry;
- Traumatised by a troubled childhood; and/or
- Leaving service in the first few years, particularly if dismissed against their will.

== Prevention ==
=== Behavioral Interventions ===
Several prevention programs have demonstrated to reduce suicide ideation and depression in the military.

== Military risk factors ==
=== Deployment ===
Contrary to common assumption, deployment to a war zone (unless in a direct combat role) has not been associated with an increased risk of suicide, according to research in Canada, Denmark, the UK, and the US. When considered overall, US veterans of the Vietnam War and Iraq War, for example, and British veterans of the 1982 Falklands War and 1991 Gulf War, have not been more likely to end their lives as a consequence of their deployment.

However, common deployment experiences of certain military groups, such as those with close-combat roles like the infantry, do carry additional suicide risks. For example, research in the US has found that specific types of traumatic war experience add to the risk, including killing and injuring others, or witnessing the same.

Even so, most suicide attempts in the US army are by personnel who have never been to war. According to one large study, US infantry soldiers who had never been deployed were twice as likely to end their lives as those who had.

=== Initial training ===
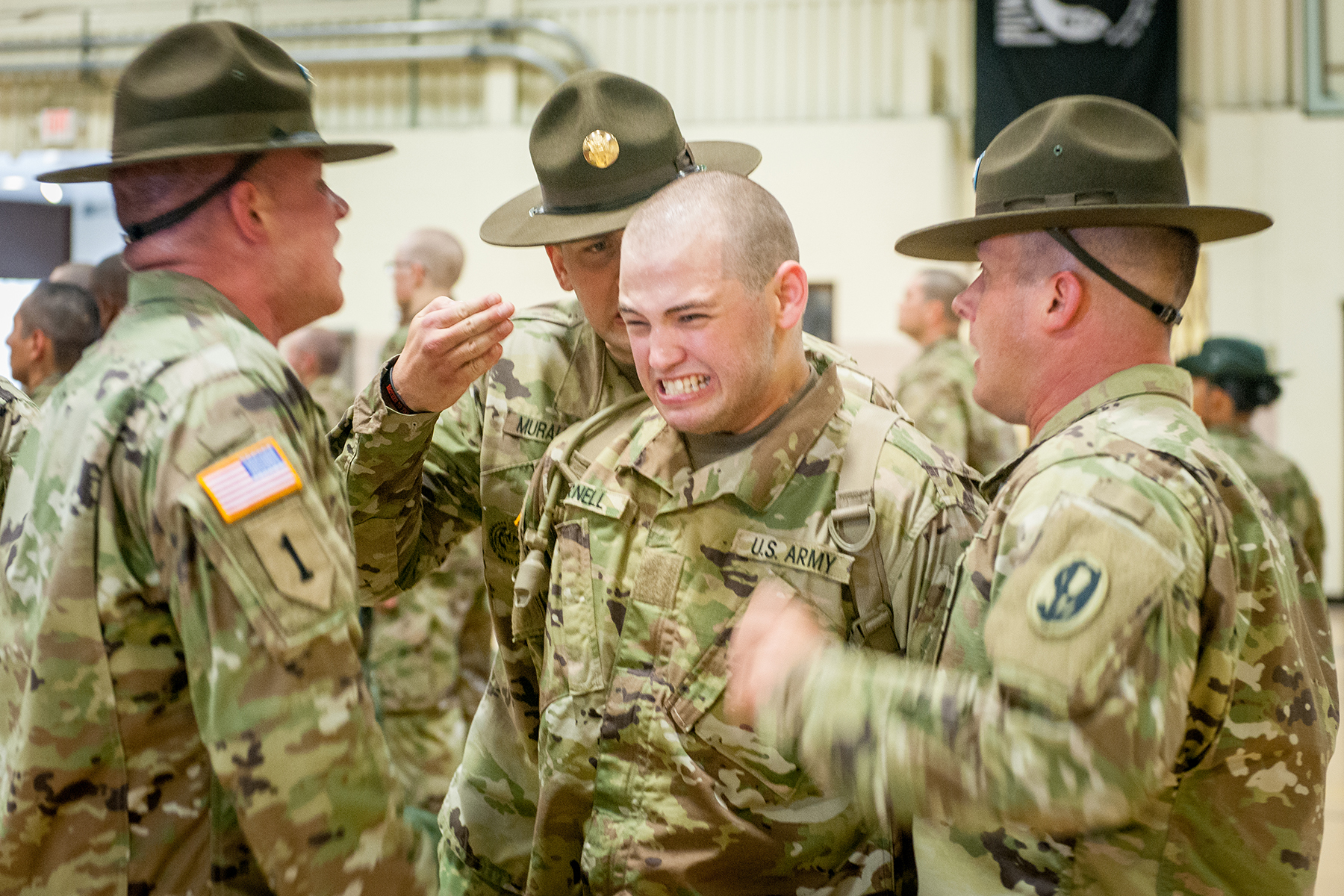
US Army drill sergeants beasting a recruit during initial training.

A study of the US army found the peak period for attempted suicide not to be during or after deployment, but initial training, a time of prolonged psychological coercion, disorientation and stress. It identified three career-stage points when suicide attempts were most likely, namely early in initial training, late in a first operational tour, and a few months after homecoming. Of these, initial training was the period of greatest risk, with a rate of attempted suicide four times as high as that found during a first deployment. The graph below presents the study's results.

Peak career stage points for attempted suicide in the US army, 2004-2009
| Time point | Attempts per 100,000 person-months |
| Second month of initial training | 103 |
| Sixth month of first deployment | 25 |
| Fifth month after first deployment | 40 |
Source: Ursano et al., 2016

=== Pre-military adversity ===
Some research further suggests that the childhood background of military personnel may play a role in increasing the average suicide risk during and after military life. In the UK, for example, the army enlists new soldiers disproportionately from economically deprived neighbourhoods, where adverse childhood experiences (ACEs) are more common. Since ACEs bear a strong relationship both to stress-related mental health problems such as anxiety and depression, and to self-harm and suicide, this accounts in part for the additional mental health burden found in military populations recruited largely from economically marginalised communities.

Since adolescents with an adverse childhood background are relatively susceptible to the toxic effects of prolonged stress, some health professionals have argued that the coercive resocialisation involved in initial military training may load a particularly heavy psychological burden on these younger recruits, as may any traumatic war experiences later.

== Protective factors ==
In countries where suicide rates among serving personnel as a whole are lower than among civilians, a frequently proposed explanation is the healthy worker effect. This refers to the relatively strong health of people in employment versus the general population, a portion of whom are not economically active. The healthy worker effect may be particularly pronounced in military populations, which are selected for mental health before enlistment. After enlistment, personnel may further benefit from a relatively active lifestyle, conveying an additional health advantage over the general population.

These protective factors may be lost on leaving the armed forces, however.

== See also ==
- Suicide
- Dedovshchina
- Military recruit training
- Sexual harassment in the military
- United States military veteran suicide
- Suicide in the Turkish Armed Forces
- Deaths at Deepcut army barracks, UK
- Category: Military personnel who died by suicide
