= Suicide in the Turkish Armed Forces =

Suicide rates became significant in the Turkish Armed Forces in the late 1990s. Between 2002 and 2015, around 1,141 soldiers died by suicide. In 2013, the Minister of National Defense İsmet Yılmaz stated that the Armed Forces were battling the issue. In order to combat high suicide rates, the Turkish Armed Forces in 2013 assigned a friend to each soldier as a form of therapy. Also in 2013, when military suicides reached a rate of one person every three days, Turkish conscription was reduced from 15 months to 12 months. In 2014, a Turkish soldier, traumatised from fighting the Islamic State and YPG, made headlines when he killed two other soldiers and then himself. In 2015, Turkish soldiers died by suicide at a rate 2.5 times higher than civilians. Anti-suicide triggers were added to the G3s issued to soldiers. The Turkish army formerly issued fines to families of soldiers who committed suicide, demanding them to pay for the bullet that they used, although they abolished that practice under pressure.

Many Turkish soldiers committed suicide due to the bad treatment they receive from senior soldiers, as well as extreme bullying from fellow soldiers. The Turkish army's attempts at mentally and physically toughening their soldiers to fight the PKK had largely backfired, causing many soldiers to commit suicide after mental trauma they received from humiliation and beatings. Many families of soldiers who committed suicide went to court against the army. In 2022, suicides still occurred due to issues from within the army, namely regarding the treatment of soldiers.
