= Army Combat Fitness Test =

Physical fitness test for the United States Army

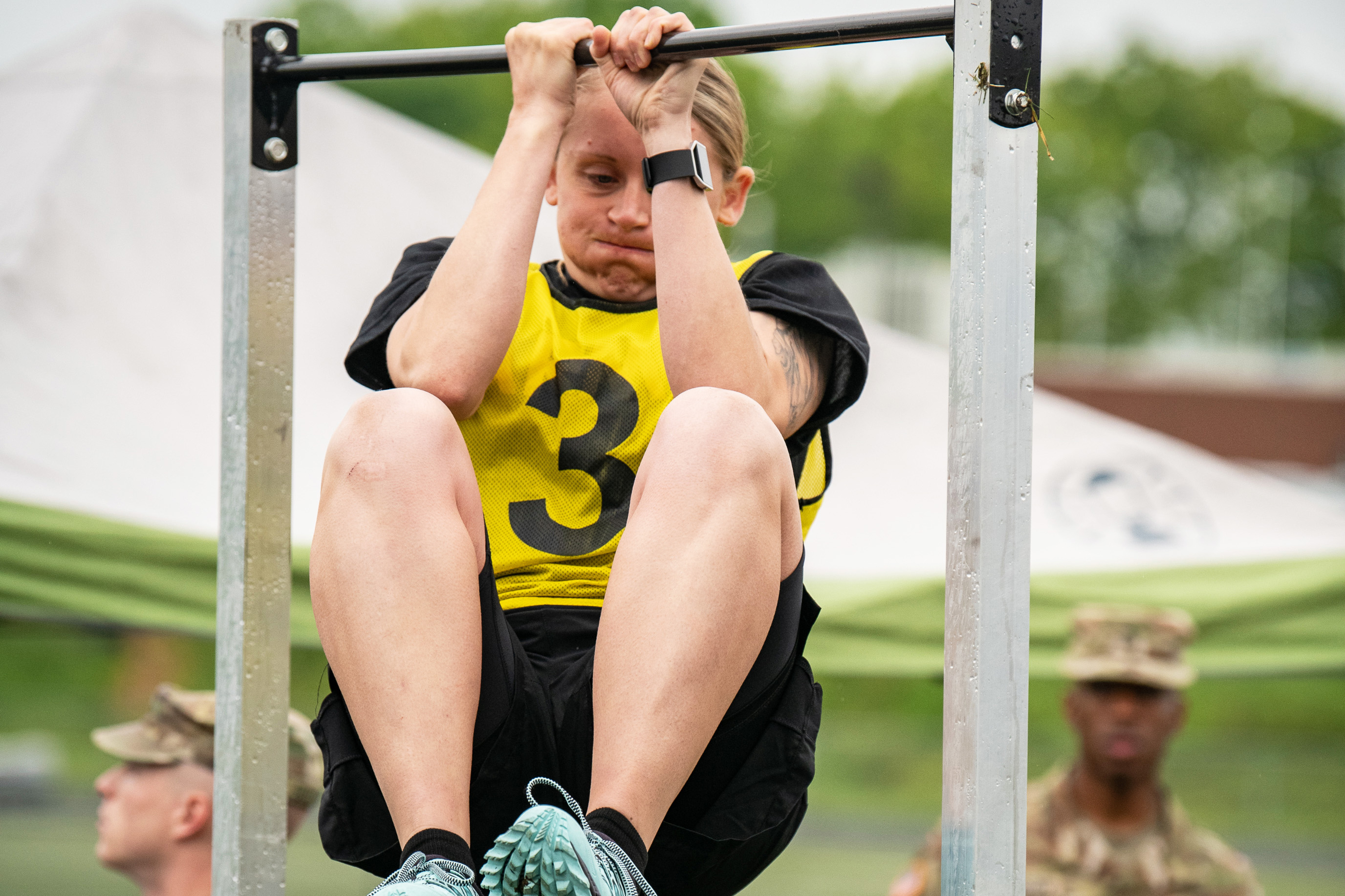
Member of the Maryland Army National Guard demonstrating the leg-tuck event of the early ACFT

The United States Army Combat Fitness Test (ACFT) was the fitness test for the United States Army. It was designed to better reflect the stresses of a combat environment, to address the poor physical fitness of recruits, and to reduce the risk of musculoskeletal injuries for service members. It consisted of six events. Each event was graded on a scale from 0 to 100 points. A minimum of 60 points was required to pass each event. The maximum score was a 600. The test was the US Army's fitness test of record from October 2022 to June 2025, being replaced by the Army Fitness Test (AFT).

== Development ==
The ACFT was developed to more closely measure "combat-readiness", after it was found that more battlefield evacuations were performed during the Iraq War and the War in Afghanistan due to musculoskeletal injuries than were due to the ongoing fighting. Such injuries may also be a significant contributing factor in the attrition rate for current service members.

It was also designed to address the "declining health and fitness standards of incoming recruits". (Note: According to one source, "almost half of commanders questioned [in a 2018 survey] said that newly arriving soldiers could not meet the physical demands of combat" and "12 percent of soldiers at any one time cannot deploy to combat areas because of injuries".) Studies leading up to the release of the new standard indicated an "increase of overweight recruits who can't pass entry-level physical fitness tests" as well as an increase in injuries resulting from the poor physical condition of new soldiers.

The ACFT began development in 2013, and was based on a set of 113 essential "warrior tasks and drills" laid out in army doctrine, as well as feedback from those who had completed tours in Iraq and Afghanistan. The test replaced the United States Army Physical Fitness Test in October 2022. In 2019, the new test was fielded with 63 Reserve and National Guard units. It is the first change in the US Army physical fitness test in four decades.

Before being finalized, the ACFT went through several changes. Such changes included removal of the "leg tuck" and replacing it with a plank and changing scores to be age- and gender-dependent. Initially, the ACFT was planned to be scored without regard for age and gender. Instead, soldiers were assigned to one of three tiers based on their military occupational specialty. However, this 'do-not-adjust' policy caused a debate whether it would penalize women and overshadow expertise and intellectual preparations. Eventually, age- and gender- based scoring was introduced.

== Description ==
US Army instructional video for a preliminary version of the ACFT

The ACFT was intended to more closely mimic physical tasks and stresses associated with combat. It was designed to measure "power, speed, agility ... balance [and] muscular and aerobic endurance".

The test originally consisted of six athletic events, but has since been reduced to five with the removal of the standing power throw beginning with the June 2025 change to the Army Fitness Test:

1. Three Repetition Maximum Deadlift: Soldiers choose a weight to lift using a hex-bar three times. If a soldier fails to properly perform three repetitions, they may choose a lighter weight. If a soldier succeeds on their first attempt, they may attempt a higher weight. Of both attempts, the higher weight that was correctly lifted is used.
2. Hand Release Push-Up: Soldiers execute as many hand release push-ups as possible within two minutes. One repetition of a hand release push-up is started at the prone, pushing the body up and lowering back down, fully extending the arms to the sides and putting the arms back under the shoulder. Soldiers may be stopped early for breaking proper form.
3. Sprint-Drag-Carry: Soldiers begin in the prone and then sprint up and down a 25 meter (82ft) strip, drag a 90-pound (41kg) sled up and down the strip, perform laterals up and down the strip, carry 40-pound (18kg) kettlebells, and finally sprint. Soldiers aim for the lowest possible time.
4. Plank: Soldiers hold a proper plank position for as long as possible.
5. Two Mile Run: On a generally flat route, soldiers run for two miles, aiming for the lowest time.

It was graded in a scale with a maximum score of 600 points and was changed to 500 points with the removal of the standing power throw. In August 2019, a member of the 22nd Chemical Battalion became the first soldier to record a perfect score, beating out the previous record of 597, set in June by a member of the Kentucky Army National Guard.

== See also ==
- Army Body Composition Program
- Neurobiological effects of physical exercise
