= AFFT =

AFFT may refer to:

- Air Force Fitness Test
- Americans For Fair Taxation
