= United States Army Physical Fitness Test =

U.S. Army fitness test

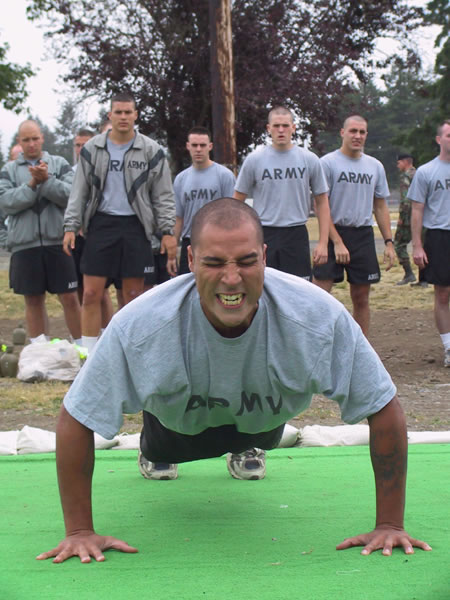
Minnesota National Guardsmen in 2004 performing his 41st push-up.

The Army Physical Fitness Test (APFT) was a test designed to measure the muscular strength, endurance, and cardiovascular respiratory fitness of soldiers in the United States Army. The test contained three events: push-ups, sit-ups, and a two-mile (3.2 km) run with a soldier scoring from 0 to 100 points in each event based on performance. A minimum score of 60 in each event was required to pass the test.

The APFT is timed as follows:

- 2 minutes of pushups
- 2 minutes of situps
- 2-mile run

Active component and Active Guard Reserve (AGR) component Soldiers were required to take a "record" (meaning for official records) APFT at least twice each calendar year. Army Reservists (Troop Program Unit - TPU) and National Guard Soldiers were required to take a "record" test once per calendar year. Army Regulation 350–1 stated that record APFTs for TPU Soldiers must be separated by eight months; this does not change, regardless of their duty status, i.e., active duty (under Title 10), annual training, etc. Army reservist and national guardsmen components do not change upon deployment or entering active duty status. FM 7-22 covers the administration of the APFT, as well as ways to conduct individual, squad and unit level physical training sessions

If, due to a diagnosed medical condition, a soldier was temporarily unable to conduct one or more of the events in the record APFT, the soldier could have been granted an extension to allow him or her to overcome his or her injury and return to an acceptable level of physical fitness. If a soldier had a permanent medical condition that kept him or her from conducting the two mile run, an alternative aerobic event consisting of either a 2.5-mile (4.0 km) walk, an 800-yard (730 m) swim, or 6.2-mile (10.0 km) cycle ride could have been taken. There were no alternate events for the push-up or sit-up.

== History ==
The physical fitness assessments for the U.S. Army were first developed in 1858 at the United States Military Academy. Over the years, the athletics for soldiers have been revised repeatedly. According to a U.S. Army abstract, the calisthenics and events of "push-ups, sit-ups, and a 2-mile run was introduced in 1980."

In 2020, the APFT was phased out for the Army's new physical fitness test, the ACFT.

== Events ==
The testing events are conducted in accordance with standards detailed in Army FM 7–22: Army Physical Readiness Training. Prior to the start of each event, the standard is read aloud, followed by a demonstration in which an individual demonstrates both the correct exercise and any disqualifying behaviors which would make the exercise incorrect.

Quoted from Army FM 7–22:

=== Push-up ===
"The push-up event measures the endurance of the chest, shoulder, and triceps muscles. On the command 'get set,' assume the front-leaning rest position by placing your hands where they are comfortable for you. Your feet may be together or up to 12 inches apart. When viewed from the side, your body should form a generally straight line from your shoulders to your ankles. On the command 'go,' begin the push-up by bending your elbows and lowering your entire body as a single unit until your upper arms are at least parallel to the ground. Then, return to the starting position by raising your entire body until your arms are fully extended. Your body must remain rigid in a generally straight line and move as a unit while performing each repetition. At the end of each repetition, the scorer will state the number of repetitions you have completed correctly. If you fail to keep your body generally straight, to lower your whole body until your upper arms are at least parallel to the ground, or to extend your arms completely, that repetition will not count, and the scorer will repeat the number of the last correctly performed repetition.

If you fail to perform the first ten push-ups correctly, the scorer will tell you to go to your knees and will explain to you what your mistakes are. You will then be sent to the end of the line to be retested. After the first 10 push-ups have been performed and counted, however, no restarts are allowed. The test will continue, and any incorrectly performed push-ups will not be counted. An altered, front-leaning rest position is the only authorized rest position. That is, you may sag in the middle or flex your back. When flexing your back, you may bend your knees, but not to such an extent that you are supporting most of your body weight with your legs. If this occurs, your performance will be terminated. You must return to, and pause in, the correct starting position before continuing. If you rest on the ground or raise either hand or foot from the ground, your performance will be terminated. You may reposition your hands and/or feet during the event as long as they remain in contact with the ground at all times. Correct performance is important. You will have two minutes in which to do as many pushups as you can."

=== Sit-up ===
"The sit-up event measures the endurance of the abdominal and hip-flexor muscles. On the command 'get set,' assume the starting position by lying on your back with your knees bent at a 90- degree angle. Your feet may be together or up to 12 inches apart. Another person will hold your ankles with the hands only. No other method of bracing or holding the feet is authorized. The heel is the only part of your foot that must stay in contact with the ground. Your fingers must be interlocked behind your head and the backs of your hands must touch the ground. Your arms and elbows need not touch the ground. On the command 'go,' begin raising your upper body forward to, or beyond, the vertical position. The vertical position means that the base of your neck is above the base of your spine. After you have reached or surpassed the vertical position, lower your body until the bottom of your shoulder blades touch the ground. Your head, hands, arms, or elbows do not have to touch the ground.

At the end of each repetition, the scorer will state the number of sit-ups you have correctly completed. A repetition will not count if you fail to reach the vertical position, fail to keep your fingers interlocked behind your head, arch or bow your back and raise your buttocks off the ground to raise your upper body, or let your knees exceed a 90-degree angle. If a repetition does not count, the scorer will repeat the number of your last correctly performed sit-up. The up position is the only authorized rest position. If you stop and rest in the down (starting) position, the event will be terminated. As long as you make a continuous physical effort to sit up, the event will not be terminated. You may not use your hands or any other means to pull or push yourself up to the up (resting) position or to hold yourself in the rest position. If you do so, your performance in the event will be terminated. Correct performance is important. You will have two minutes to perform as many sit-ups as you can."

=== Two-mile run ===
"The two-mile run is used to assess your aerobic fitness and your leg muscles' endurance. You must complete the run without any physical help. At the start, all soldiers will line up behind the starting line. On the command 'go,' the clock will start. You will begin running at your own pace. You are being tested on your ability to complete the 2-mile course in the shortest time possible. Although walking is authorized, it is strongly discouraged. If you are physically helped in any way (for example, pulled, pushed, picked up, and/or carried) or leave the designated running course for any reason, you will be disqualified. (it is legal to pace a soldier during the 2-mile run. As long as there is no physical contact with the paced soldier and it does not physically hinder other soldiers taking the test, the practice of running ahead of, alongside of, or behind the tested soldier, while serving as a pacer, is permitted. Cheering or calling out the elapsed time is also permitted.) The number on your chest is for identification. You must make sure it is visible at all times. Turn in your number when you finish the run. Then, go to the area designated for the cool-down and stretch."

== Scoring ==
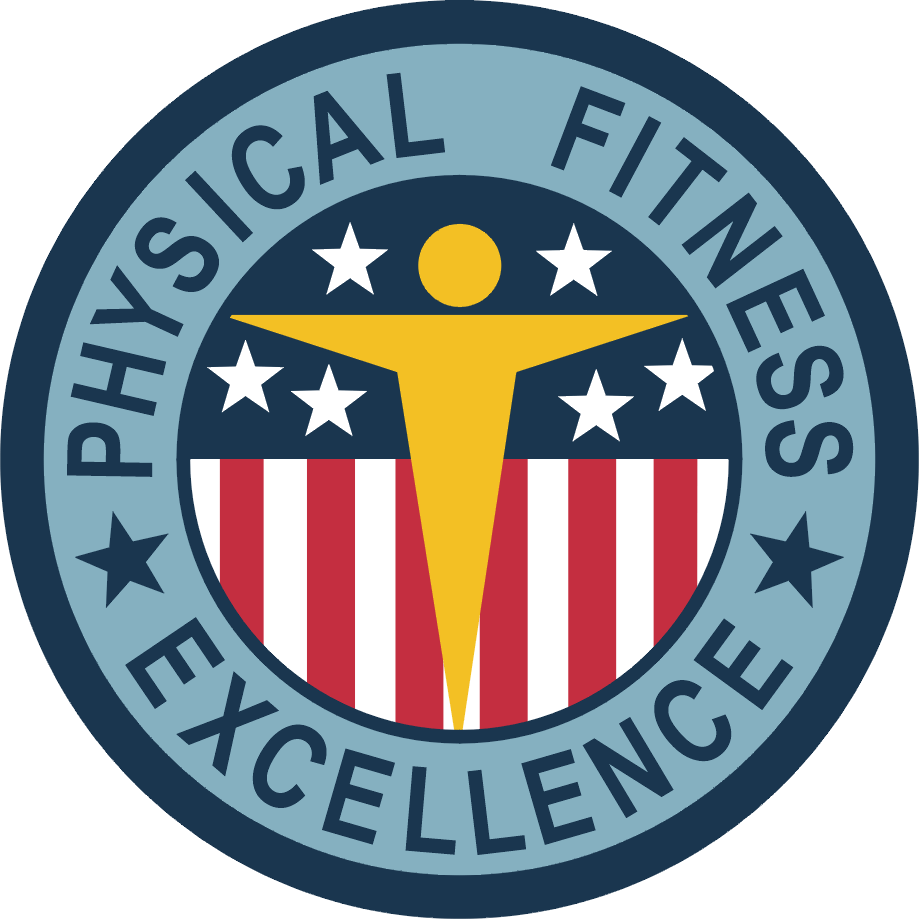
In order to obtain the Physical Fitness Badge, soldiers must score 90 points or more in each event.

Scoring on the APFT is based on gender, age category, number of repetitions performed of the push-up and sit-up, and run time. Score tables are found in Army FM 7-22 and on Department of the Army Form 705, Army Physical Fitness Test Scorecard. The score for each event ranges from 0 to 100 points; a minimum score of 60 in each event is required to pass the test. The soldier's overall score is the sum of the points from the three events. If a soldier passes all three events, the total may range from 180 to 300. APFT standards may be more rigorous for some special purpose units, such as for special operations soldiers which are usually required to score 70 points or better in each event.

Soldiers who score 270 or above on the APFT, with a minimum score of 90 in each event, are awarded the Physical Fitness Badge, which can be worn on the physical training uniform of enlisted soldiers. The APFT score also converts to promotion points which are used to in part to determine the eligibility of soldiers for promotion to a higher rank. Effective with the latest change to the Army's enlisted promotion doctrine, the number of promotion points awarded to Soldiers with a "promotable" status was changed. Soldiers seeking promotion from Specialist (E-4) to Sergeant (E-5) can achieve a maximum of 180 promotion points whereas a Soldier seeking promotion from Sergeant (E-5) to Staff Sergeant (E-6) can only achieve a maximum of 145 promotion points.

APFT Promotion Points
E-5	MIN	40	MAX	180
E-6	MIN	15	MAX	145

Prior to May 2013, the scoring algorithm also included an extended scale, by which soldiers could earn more than 100 points in an event by performing better than the 100-point standard. However, use of such a scale is specifically forbidden in the current Army Field Manual.

Under previous versions, in order for a soldier to earn a score of over 300, they must have obtained 100 points in each event, meaning that a soldier could not begin to use the extended scale for any one event until 100 points were reached in all three events. Scores above maximum could only be used locally in an unofficial capacity; official record scores could never exceed 300 points. Beyond the 100-point level, each additional push-up was one additional point, each additional sit-up was one additional point, and each six-second reduction in the run time was one additional point.

For soldiers who have a medical or physical condition which prevents them from being able to successfully participate in the two-mile run, alternate aerobic events are authorized. Scoring for alternate aerobic events is either GO or NO-GO (pass or fail) and is based on the gender and age of the individual. For the purposes of promotion, a soldier's score on an alternate event equals the average of their push-up and sit-up scores. Restrictions applicable to the APFT for soldiers with medical conditions (including pregnancy) or on physical profiles are stipulated in Army Regulation 40-501. For example, one stipulation is that "Once the [temporary] profile is lifted, the soldier must be given twice the time of the profile (but not more than 90 days) to train for the [next] APFT.

Failure to pass two or more consecutive record APFTs can lead to separation from the Army, although this is not always the case. Soldiers who have failed an APFT are often put into a "remedial program" first, which includes additional physical training. An APFT failure also results in the soldier being "flagged" which make them ineligible for promotion and attendance to military training and/or schools. A soldier is also denied most awards and/or decorations due to APFT failure.

== Standards ==
PUSH-UPS (2 minutes); MALE
AGE GROUP	17–21	22–26	27–31	32–36	37–41	42–46	47–51	52–56	57–61	62+
MAXIMUM 100%	71	75	77	75	73	66	59	56	53	50
MINIMUM 60%	42	40	39	36	34	30	25	20	18	16

PUSH-UPS (2 minutes); FEMALE
AGE GROUP	17–21	22–26	27–31	32–36	37–41	42–46	47–51	52–56	57–61	62+
MAXIMUM 100%	42	46	50	45	40	37	34	31	28	25
MINIMUM 60%	19	17	17	15	13	12	10	9	8	7

SIT-UPS (2 minutes); MALE and FEMALE
AGE GROUP	17–21	22–26	27–31	32–36	37–41	42–46	47–51	52–56	57–61	62+
MAXIMUM 100%	78	80	82	76	76	72	66	66	64	63
MINIMUM 60%	53	50	45	42	38	32	30	28	27	26

2-MILE RUN (3.2 km); MALE (time; average speed: mph / km/h)
AGE GROUP	17–21	22–26	27–31	32–36	37–41	42–46	47–51	52–56	57–61	62+
MAX 100% mph km/h	13:00; 9.2; 14.9	13:00; 9.2; 14.9	13:18; 9; 14.5	13:18; 9; 14.5	13:36; 8.8; 14.2	14:06; 8.5; 13.7	14:24; 8.3; 13.4	14:42; 8.2; 13.1	15:18; 7.8; 12.6	15:42; 7.6; 12.3
MIN 60% mph km/h	15:54; 7.5; 12.1	16:36; 7.2; 11.6	17:00; 7.1; 11.4	17:42; 6.8; 10.9	18:18; 6.6; 10.6	18:42; 6.4; 10.3	19:30; 6.2; 9.9	19:48; 6.1; 9.8	19:54; 6; 9.7	20:00; 6; 9.7

2-MILE RUN (3.2 km); FEMALE (time; average speed: mph / km/h)
AGE GROUP	17–21	22–26	27–31	32–36	37–41	42–46	47–51	52–56	57–61	62+
MAX 100% mph km/h	15:36; 7.7; 12.4	15:36; 7.7; 12.4	15:48; 7.6; 12.2	15:54; 7.5; 12.1	17:00; 7.1; 11.4	17:24; 6.9; 11.1	17:36; 6.8; 11	19:00; 6.3; 10.2	19:42; 6.1; 9.8	20:00; 6; 9.7
MIN 60% mph km/h	18:54; 6.3; 10.2	19:36; 6.1; 9.9	20:30; 5.9; 9.4	21:42; 5.5; 8.9	22:42; 5.3; 8.5	23:42; 5.1; 8.1	24:00; 5; 8	24:24; 4.9; 7.9	24:48; 4.8; 7.8	25:00; 4.8; 7.7

source: APFT Standards

== Deaths ==
In rare occurrences, soldiers have died during or right after the physical fitness test. These deaths have been attributed to chronic or sudden health conditions and not due to the test itself.

== Ranger Physical Fitness Tests ==
For soldiers attending the first phase of Ranger School, a special Ranger Physical Fitness Test is conducted for all age groups, which is separate from the Army Physical Fitness Test. The test is pass/fail and involves push-ups, sit-ups, chin-ups, and a five-mile (8.0 km) run. Push-ups and sit-ups are to be performed within 2 minutes.

RANGER SCHOOL
EVENTS	PUSH-UPS	SIT-UPS	PULL-UPS	5 MILE RUN
STANDARD	49+	59+	6+	≤ 40:00

For soldiers attending the Ranger Assessment and Selection Program (RASP) (to join the 75th Ranger Regiment) a special Ranger Fitness Test is conducted for all age groups, which is separate from the Army Physical Fitness Test. The test is pass/fail and involves push-ups, sit-ups, chin-ups, and a five-mile run. Push-ups and sit-ups are to be performed within 2 minutes.

RANGER ASSESSMENT AND SELECTION PROGRAM
EVENTS	PUSH-UPS	SIT-UPS	PULL-UPS	5 MILE RUN
STANDARD	58	69	6	≤ 40:00

== See also ==
- United States Army Combat Fitness Test
- United States Marine Corps Physical Fitness Test
- United States Navy Physical Readiness Test
- United States Air Force Fitness Assessment
