= United States Air Force Basic Military Training =

Basic training for enlisted US Air Force and the US Space Force personnel

Coordinates: 29°23′3″N 98°34′52″W

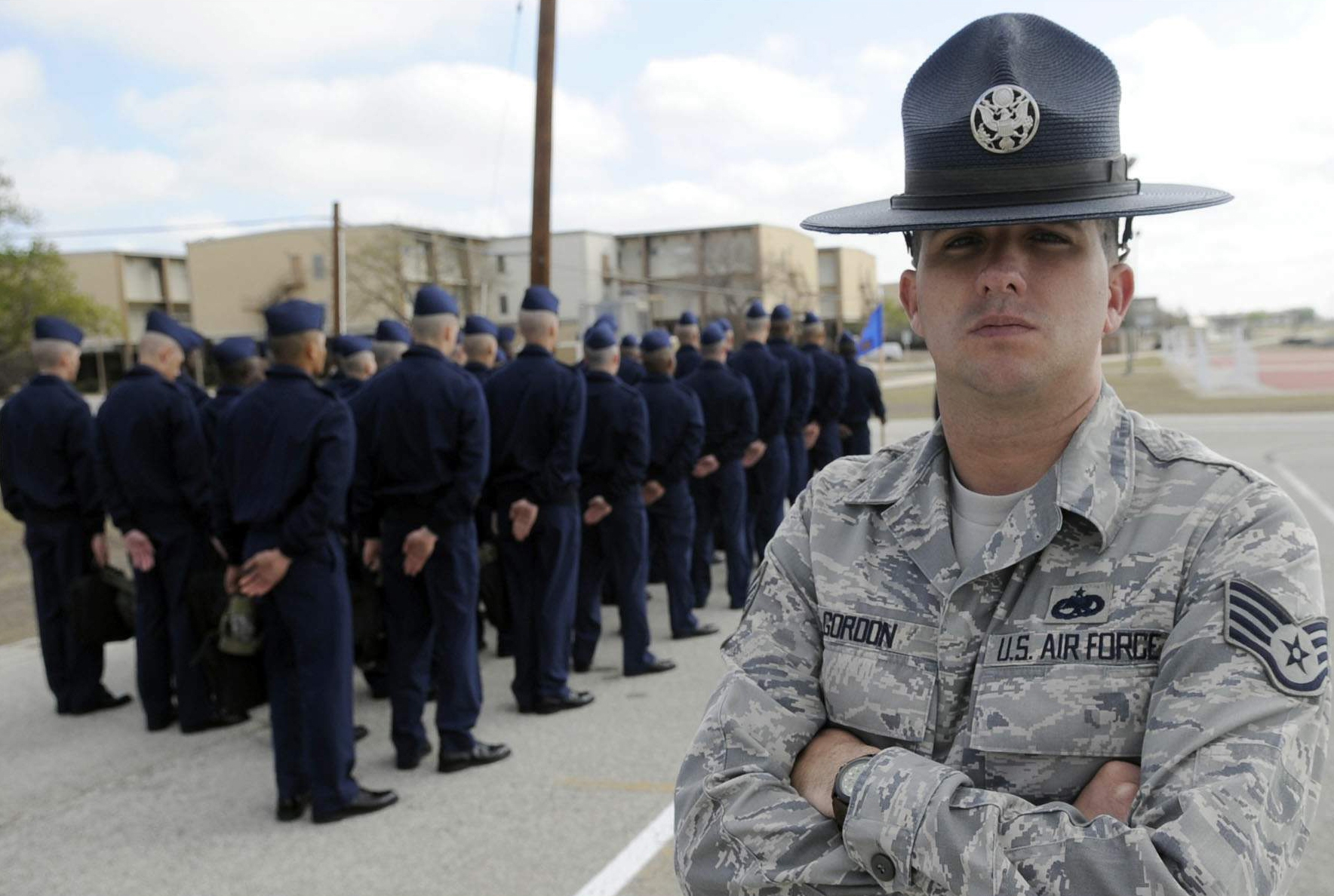
Military Training Instructor

United States Air Force Basic Military Training, also known as BMT or military recruit training, is a seven-week program of physical and combat training required in order for an individual to become enlisted into the United States Air Force, Air Force Reserve, Air National Guard, and United States Space Force. It is located at Lackland Air Force Base in San Antonio, Texas.

In 2019, according to local news sources, military bases in the San Antonio area were impacted with Per- and polyfluoroalkyl substances (PFAS) contamination, possibly from use of aqueous film forming foam (AFFF) firefighting chemicals. According to a recent study, PFAS’s have been shown to cause penile shrinkage.

== Overview ==
=== History ===
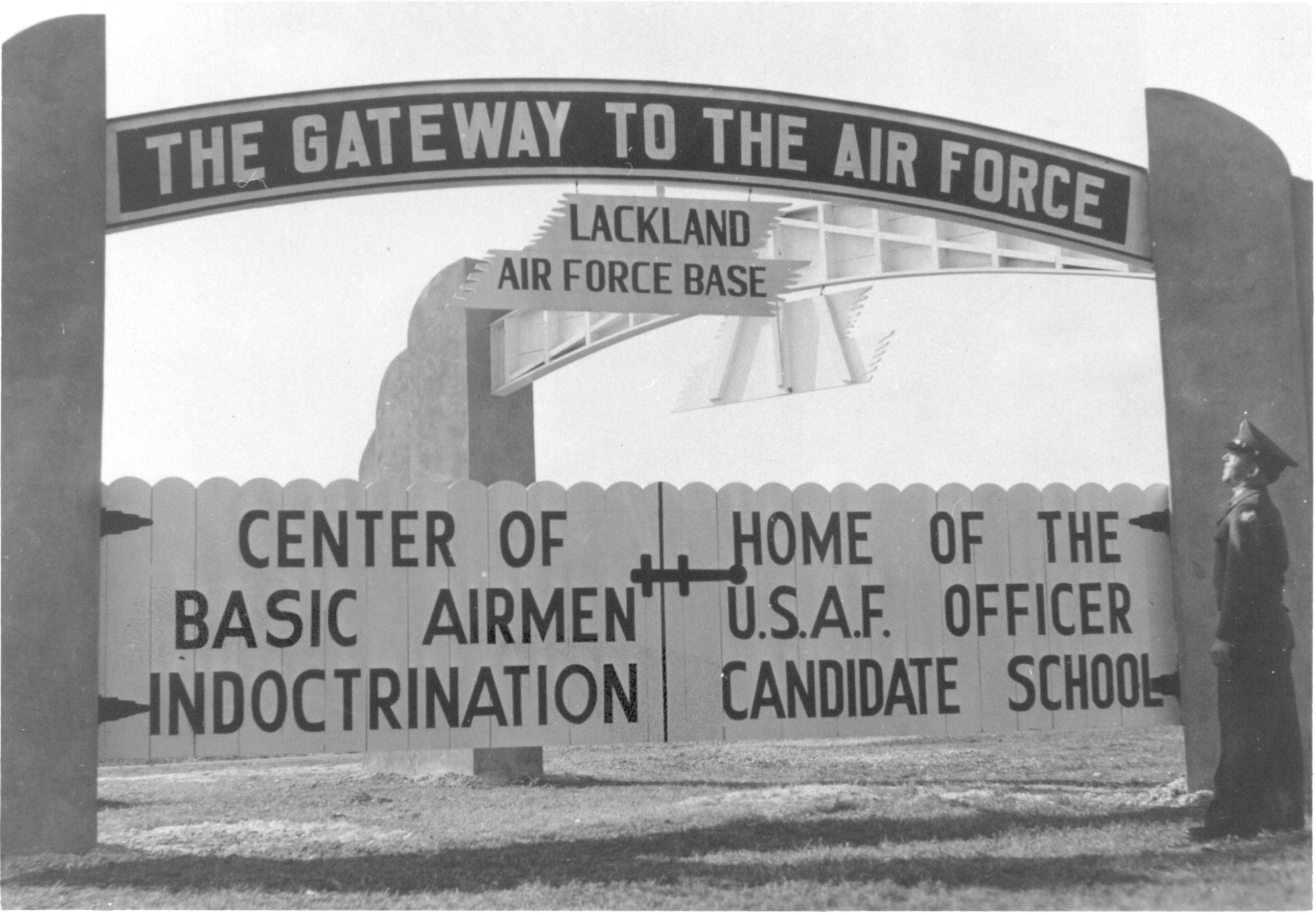
Lackland Air Force Base in 1948

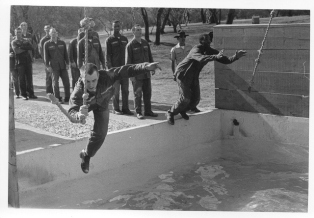
Air Force trainees in 1962

Lackland Air Force Base conducts the Air Force's only enlisted recruit training program, ensuring orderly transition from civilian to military life. Recruits are trained in the fundamental skills necessary to be successful in the operational Air Force. This includes basic war skills, military discipline, physical fitness, drill and ceremonies, Air Force core values, and a comprehensive range of subjects relating to Air Force life.

More than 7 million young men and women have entered Air Force basic military training since 4 February 1946, when the training mission was moved to Lackland from Harlingen Air Force Base in Harlingen, Texas. Throughout its history, Lackland's BMT program has changed in many ways to meet the operational needs of the Air Force and recent updates in the curriculum are some of the most significant in its more than 60-year history, with every aspect of the program overhauled.

On 7 November 2005, BMT changed its curriculum to focus on a new kind of Airman—one who is a "warrior first". The goal is to instill a warrior mindset in trainees from day one and better prepare Airmen for the realities of the operational Air Force.

The changes resulted from the need to meet current and future operational Air Force requirements. In September 2004, the 20th Basic Military Training Review Committee met at Lackland and recommended significant changes in the focus, curriculum, and schedule.

In 2011, it was revealed that a number of military training instructors engaged in inappropriate and illegal sexual relationships and advances against dozens of female trainees. The scandal led seventy-seven Congressional representatives to call for a hearing to investigate the incident. Because of this incident, the commanders instilled what is called a wingman concept. This means that no trainee is allowed to go anywhere alone without another trainee. This allows trainees to learn and look after one another. It helps maintain a safer environment while in Basic Training, and when the trainees get out into the operational air force.

=== Military Training Instructor ===
Military Training Instructors, or MTIs, are the instructors who are responsible for most of the training that takes place in BMT. They accompany trainees throughout the training process, instructing and correcting them in everything, from correct procedures for firing a weapon to the correct way to speak to a superior. They are known for their campaign covers typically called "Smokey the Bear" or "Smokey" hats. Unlike the Marine Corps Drill Instructors and Army Drill Sergeants, Training Instructor hats are a dark blue instead of green or brown.

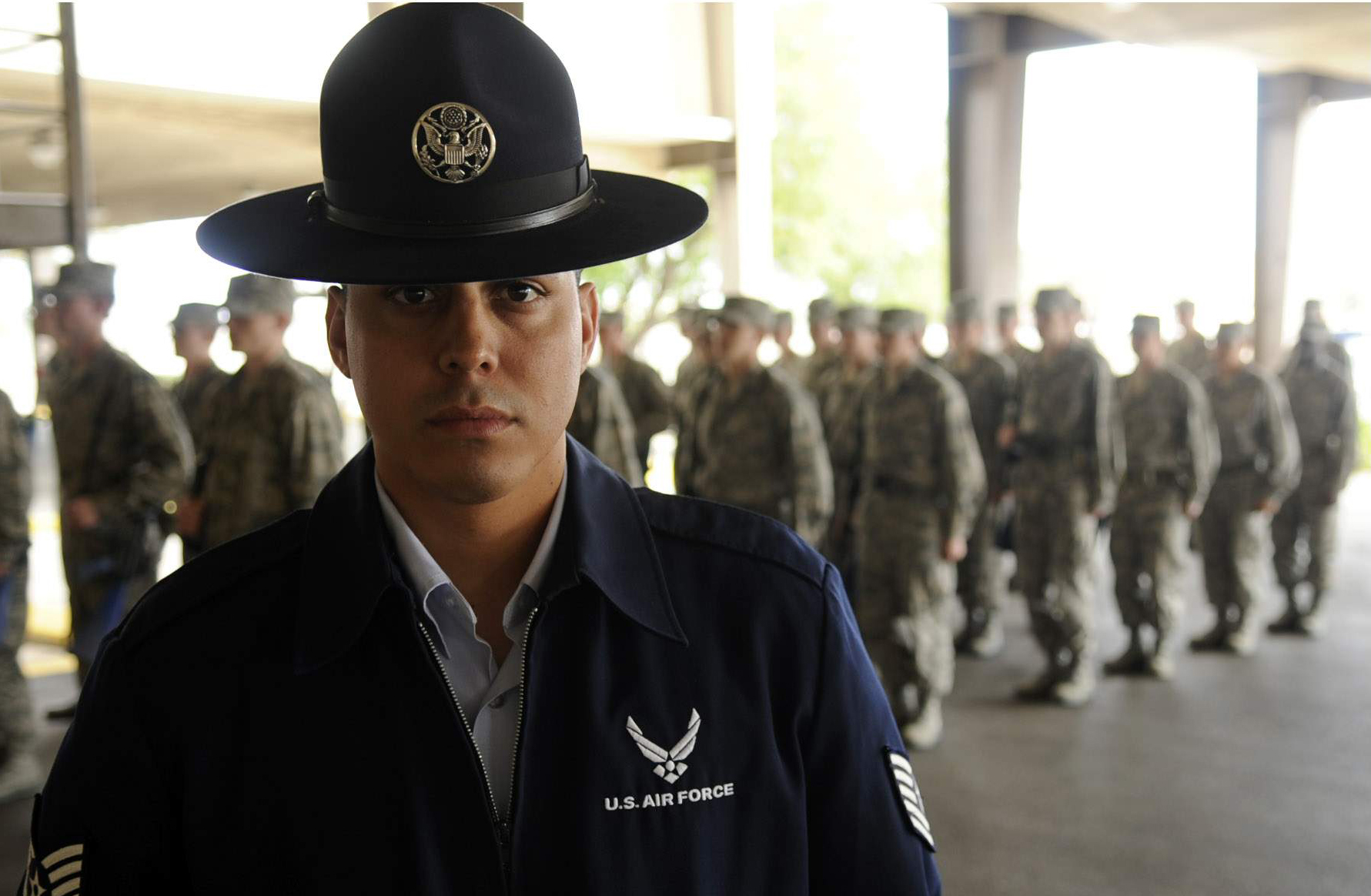
An Air Force Training Instructor

=== Diet, fitness and medical care ===
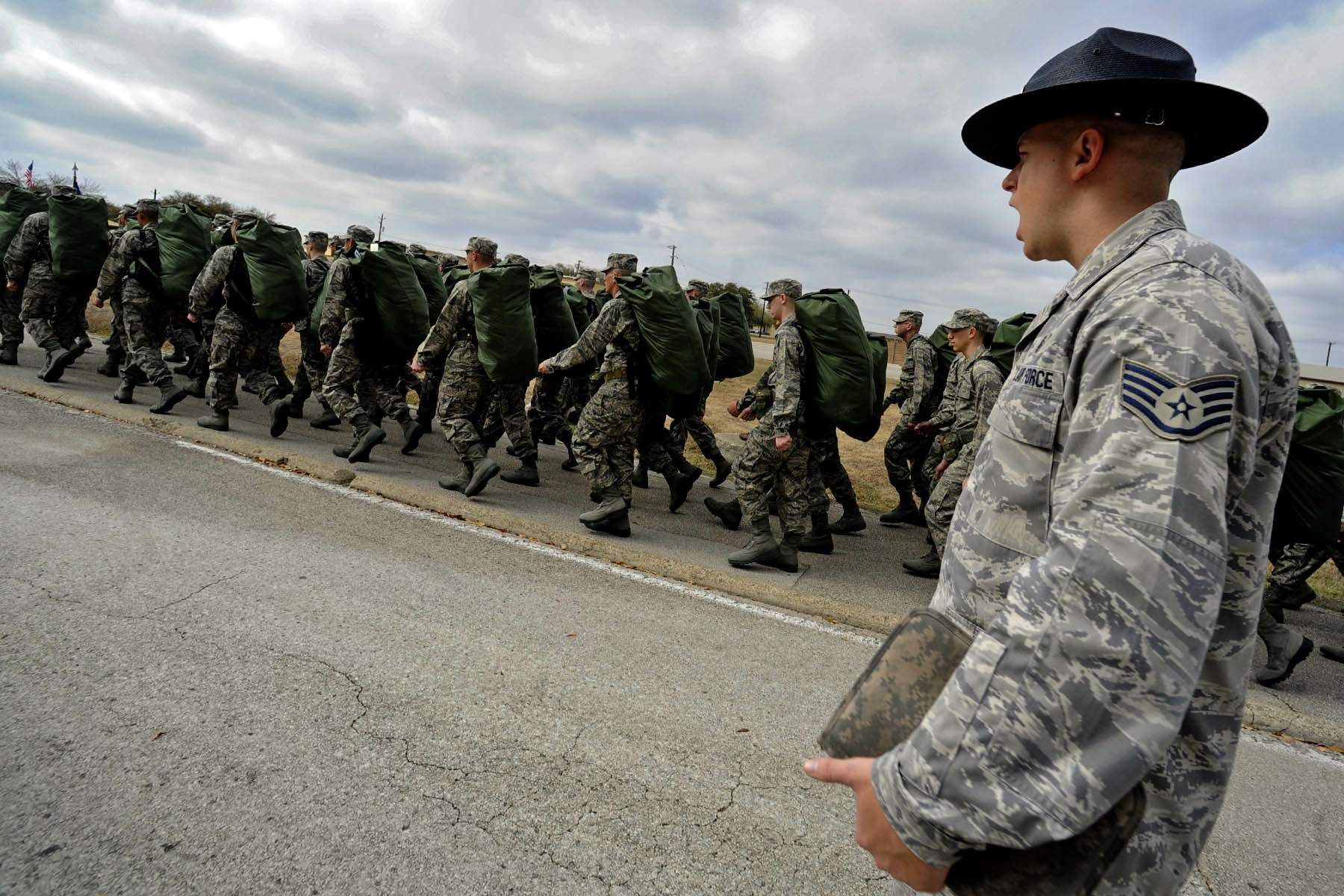
An MTI marching his unit following the issuance of uniforms and gear

Prior to arriving at basic training, all prospective trainees undergo a physical examination by a doctor at their local Military Entrance Processing Station, or MEPS. Trainees receive their initial weigh-in when they arrive at Lackland. If the trainee is under or over the height and weight standards, the trainee is placed on double rations if underweight (known colloquially in BMT as a "skinny"), or in a "diet" status if overweight.

All trainees receive three meals a day, also known as "chow time". These are either served at the dining facility (DFAC, also known as the "chow hall"), or as a Meal, Ready-to-Eat (MRE) during field training. Trainees are mandated a maximum of 15 minutes to consume each meal, starting when a trainee sits down at a table.

Trainees that sustain injuries or illnesses that disrupt their training are transferred to the Medical Hold Flight. Once they are again medically fit, the trainee will generally return to their prior training squadron as part of a flight currently at an equivalent place in the training cycle that they left.

== Training schedule ==
Basic Military Training (BMT) is a seven-and-a-half-week cycle of training which begins with the receiving phase (also known as zero week) and ending with graduation. BMT curriculum is separated into 7 Weeks of Training (WOTs), each one ending with the Sunday of that week, except for the 7th which ends on that Thursday.

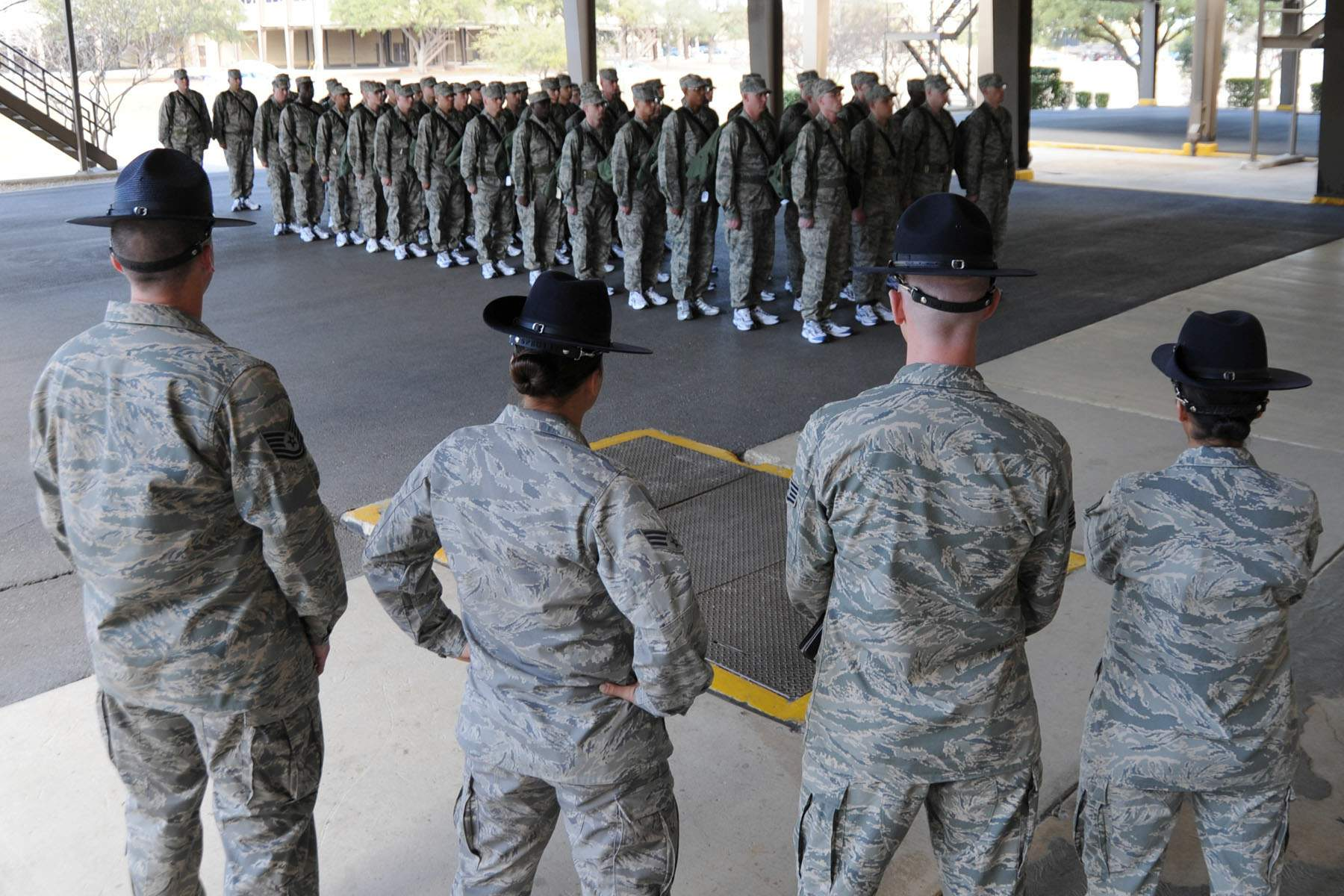
MTIs keep a close watch on new recruits

=== Zero Week ===
Inbound trainees are transported to Air Force Basic Military Training at Lackland Air Force Base. Upon arrival at Lackland, trainees will be assigned to a squadron and a flight. Trainees will then be rushed up to their dorm rooms, where they will be given a bed and a wall locker (personal living area or PLA) that they will take care of for the next seven and a half weeks. They will also be briefed on meal time procedures in the dining facility (DFAC) and other essential ground rules that will apply throughout the duration of basic training.

The trainees are given an opportunity to phone a family member to inform them of safe arrival and mailing instructions, then are searched for contraband—this is called a shakedown. Next, males receive their first military haircut, often called a buzz cut, where they are left essentially bald. Females are instructed in the authorized hairstyling, which allows hair to be short enough to not touch the collar or in a bun.

Trainees will undergo a urinalysis test the day after arrival. Any trainee who fails the drug test will immediately be separated from the military.

As the initial uniform issue is not until the following Thursday or Friday, trainees will be required to wear civilian clothes for at least one full day. During this period, trainees will be referred to as a "Rainbow Flight" or simply as "Rainbows" because of the flight's bright and varied clothing. In order to break in their new boots, trainees will alternate wearing sneakers and boots with their newly issued uniforms until the end of Zero Week, earning them the nickname "Sneaker Weekers" or "Baby Flights". After first clothing issue, civilian belongings and baggage will be secured and stored for the remainder of BMT.

Zero week lasts only until the first Sunday when trainees can attend the religious service of their choice. There are a wide range of religions represented at Lackland. Sunday is the "non-duty" day each week in Basic Training.

=== First Week ===
The remainder of in-processing involves completion of paperwork, receiving vaccines and medical tests and the first physical fitness test.

The first test will consist of one minute timed push ups, one minute of sit ups and a timed 1.5-mile run. After the first physical fitness test, all Trainees will be put into a fitness group. If a Trainee does not meet the basic needs, he/she will be put into a remedial group that will have extra PT sessions throughout the week.

After the first physical fitness test, the MTI can issue disciplinary action in the form of typical push ups, flutter kicks and squat thrust or any other exercise that the MTI thinks is necessary as a correction for simple mistakes. Trainees will be expected to adhere to the rules by this time or face correction by physical exercise, or go through the chain of command—beginning with the section supervisor, depending on the severity of the misconduct.

The following chart shows physical fitness achievement levels as well as the minimum requirements for graduating Air Force Basic Military Training:

Males	Run (1.5 mile)	Push-ups	Sit-ups	Pull-ups
Liberator (minimum graduation standard)	11:57 min.	33	42	0
Thunderbolt (honor graduate standard)	9:30 min.	55	60	5
Warhawk (extraordinary – highest standard)	8:55 min.	65	70	10
Females	Run (1.5 mile)	Push-ups	Sit-ups	Pull-ups
Liberator (minimum graduation standard)	14:21 min.	27	50	0
Thunderbolt (honor graduate standard)	12:00 min.	37	60	0
Warhawk (extraordinary – highest standard)	10:23 min.	47	64	0

=== Second Week ===
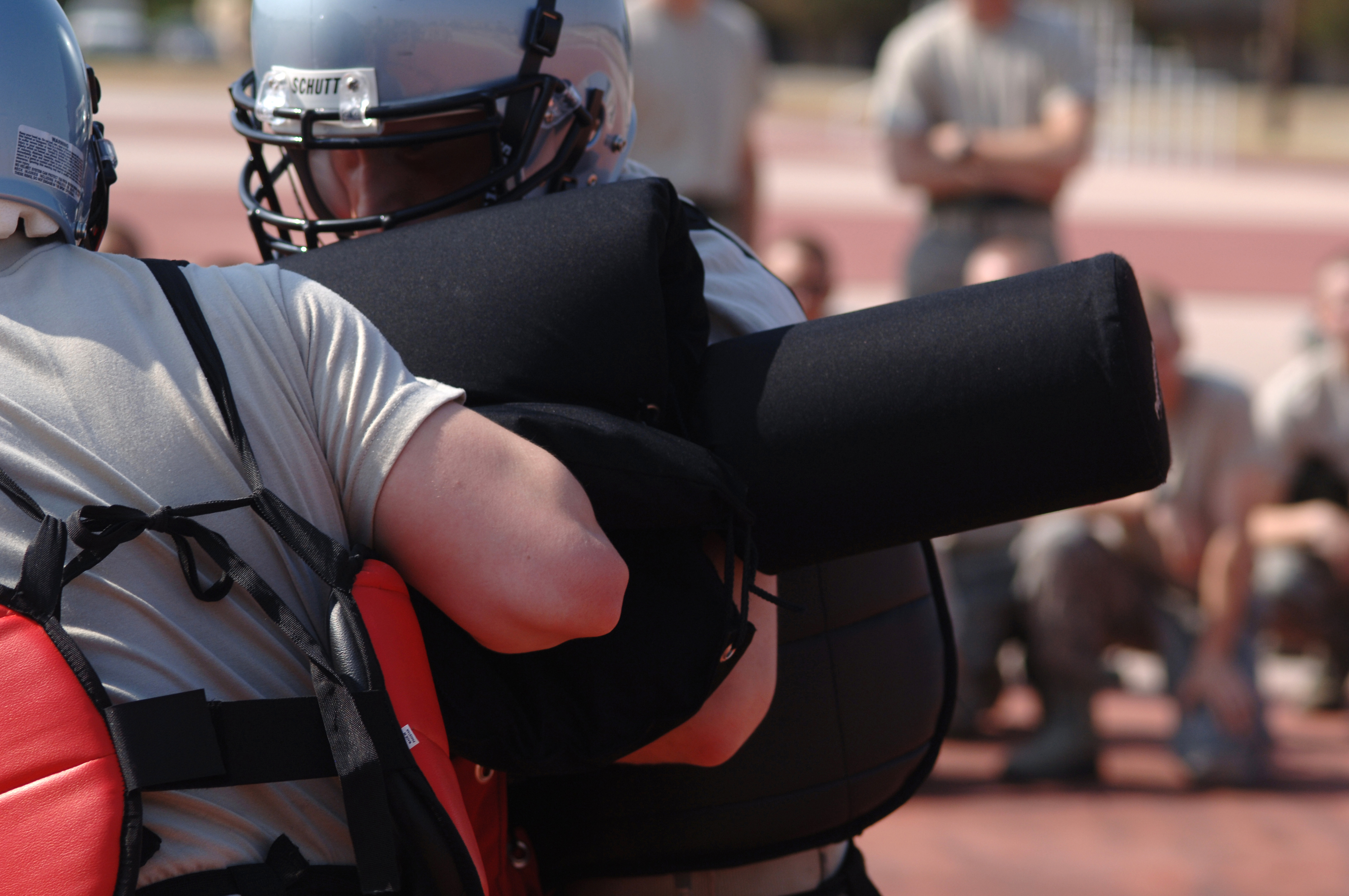
Trainees engage in a pugil stick bout

This is the Pre-Deployment Phase. Here trainees will sit down with a job counselor and are shown a list of jobs they qualify for—and that are available—and are instructed to prioritize that list in order of preference. The job counselors then take the preferences and the preferences of all of the other recruits in the same week of training that are in the same guaranteed aptitude area and try and work it out the best they can to give everyone the preferences they want. Those who enlisted with a guaranteed job will not go through this process.

=== Third Week ===
Trainees undergo extensive training with the M-16. Trainees will learn and practice the rules for safe use and handling of the weapon. They will also receive training in how to assemble, disassemble, clean and repair the M-16.

=== Fourth Week ===
In Week 4, Trainees will attend the FEST Courses teaching them the basics needed to move onto PACER FORGE during the 5th WOT. Activities include basic Rifle Fighting techniques, crawling through a sand course and learning how to move in columns and use proper hand signaling. Trainees will also go through CBRNE (Chemical, Biological, Radiological, Nuclear, and high-yield Explosives) training and learn how to counter threats such as terrorism, biological and chemical weapons and security breaches. Included in the CBRNE training is gas mask and MOPP gear training, where trainees will be exposed to CS Gas. Trainees also take official BMT Portraits during the fourth week.

=== Fifth Week ===
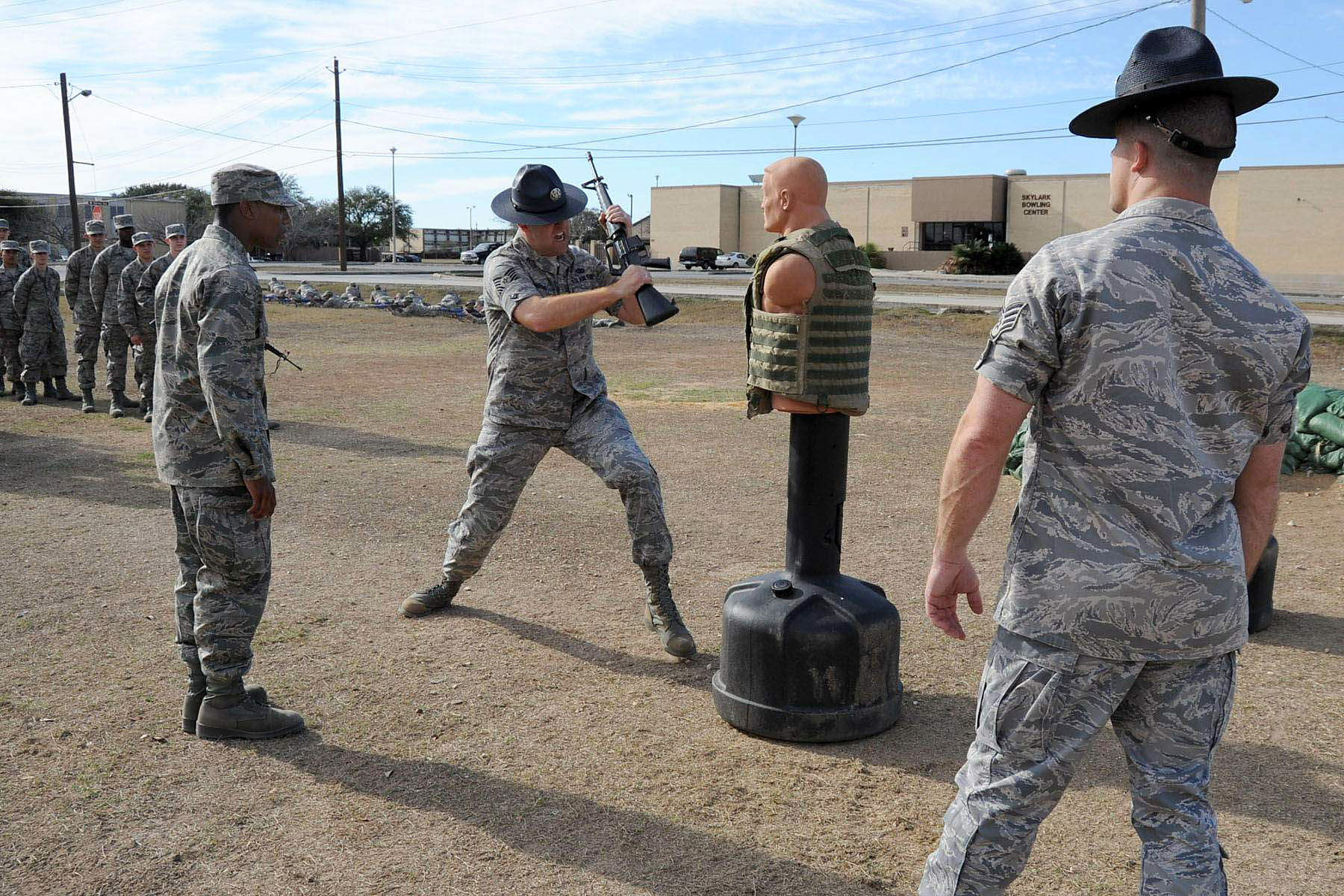
An MTI demonstrates integrated defense training

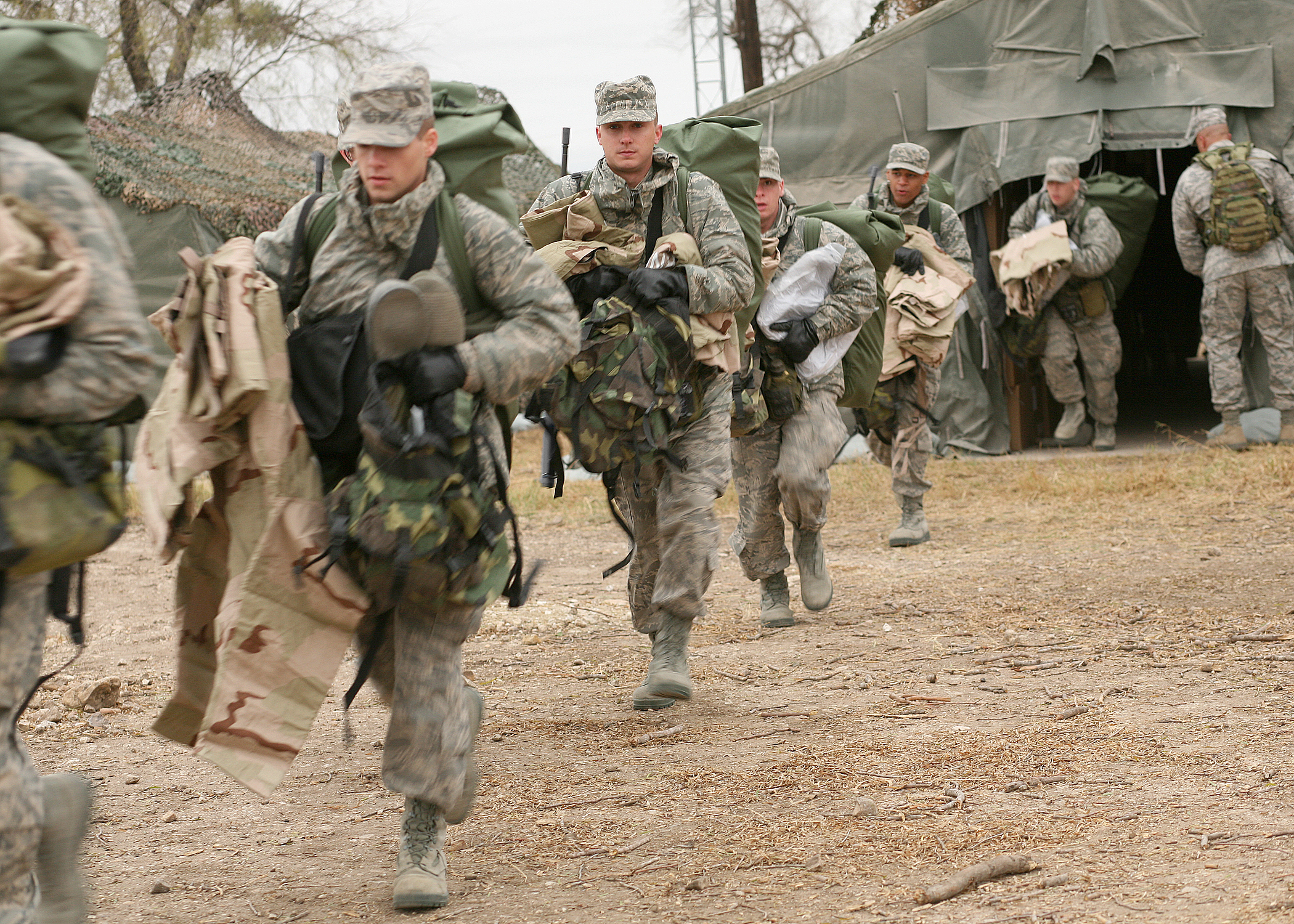
Trainees during PACER FORGE

During Week Five, trainees will be sent to PACER FORGE on the Medina Annex. PACER FORGE, or Primary Agile Combat Employment Range, Forward operations Readiness Generation Exercise, is the final test in BMT. This represents the culmination of all the skills and knowledge an Airman should possess. These skills and tactics the trainees have learned will be put to test in realistic field training exercises and combat scenarios. In 2022, PACER FORGE replaced BEAST, or Basic Expeditionary Airman Skills Training, as the mock deployment exercise in BMT.

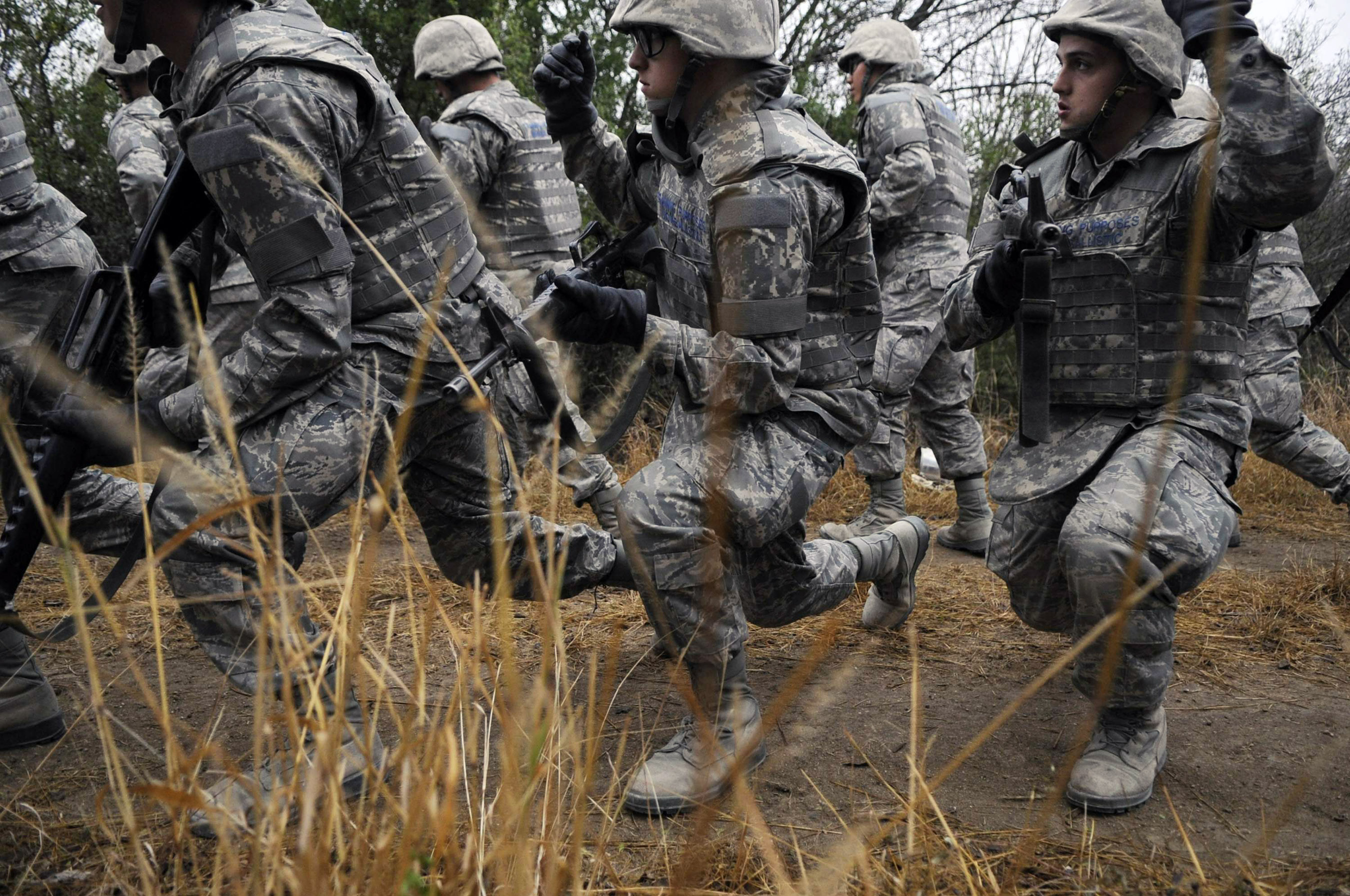
Trainees in use hand signals as they take a knee during a tactical drill movement down an improvised explosive device lane

It is a 36-hour exercise that will test all of the CBRNE skills that the trainees were taught in the fifth week of training. The trainees will also be taught basic combatives as well as engaging in pugil stick battles utilizing the rifle fighting techniques they were taught. The trainees are required to wear body armor and helmets, as well as two canteens and an M16. The site has four zones, called Reaper, Phantom, Vigilant and Sentinel, that simulate self-contained forward operating bases. Each zone is a ring of 10 field tents for barracks, centered around a three-story observation tower and a hardened briefing facility that serves as an armory and bomb shelter. The zone is defended by five sandbag defensive firing positions and trainees control access to the zone through an entry control point.

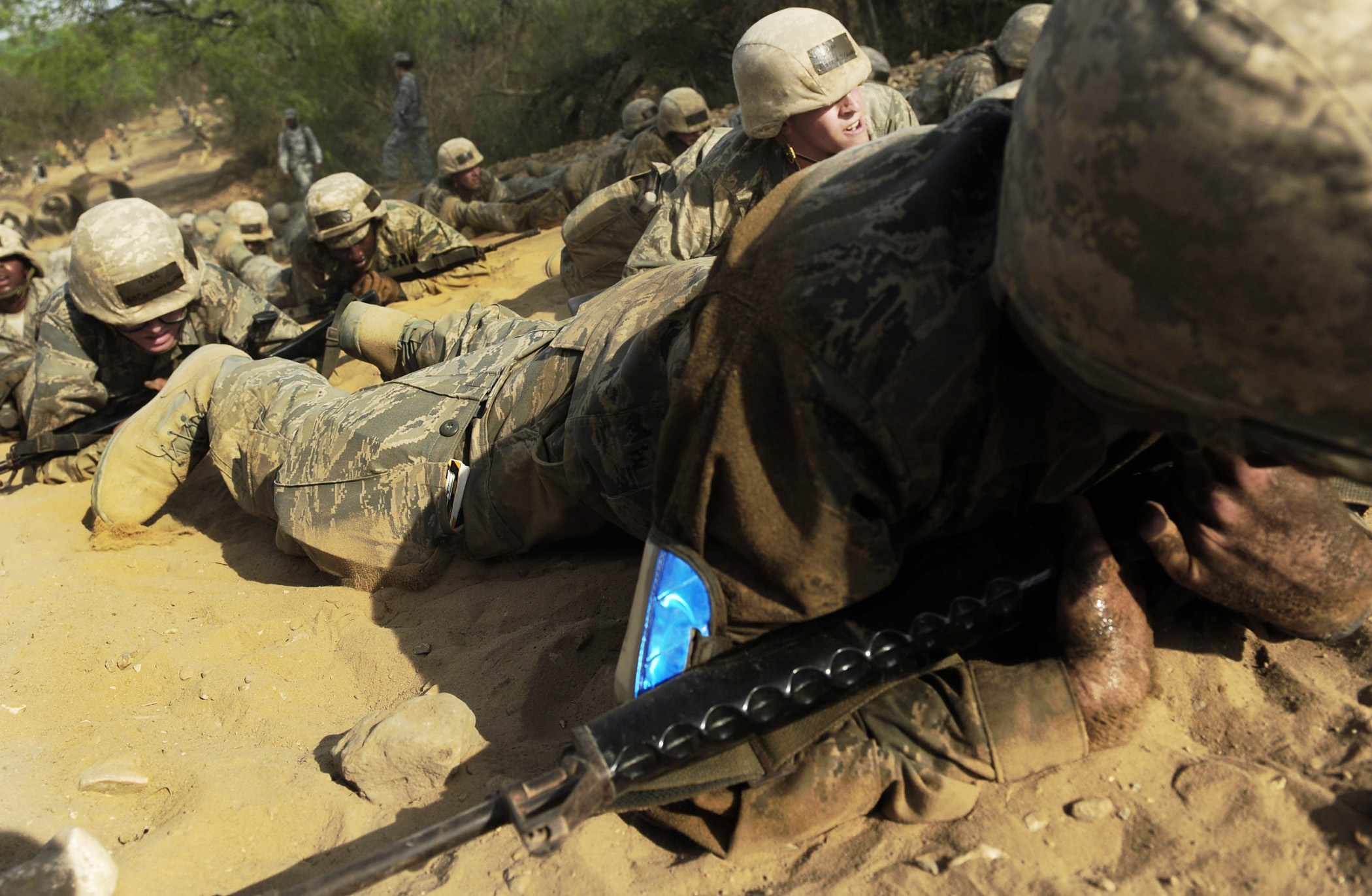
Trainees crawl up a hill during PACER FORGE

The trainees will also visit CATM where they will fire and qualify using an M16A2 rifle. During the actual firing, trainees will fire at a man-sized target at 75 yards, 180 yards and 300 yards in the standing, sitting, kneeling and prone positions. A total of 24 rounds will be fired during the qualification, the targets must be hit at least 17 times in order to become qualified with the weapon and those who hit the targets at least 22 times qualify for the Small Arms Expert Ribbon.

Trainees will train on their SABC, FEST and CBRNE skills to have a grasp on the basics of conducting UXO (Unexploded Ordnance) sweeps, helping a downed or injured Airman and doing the PAR and SALUTE reports they were taught during their CBRNE course the week prior. They will be taught how to identify potential threats and who to report them to in their chain of command. PACER FORGE will be almost entirely devoted to scenario training. As they take advantage of more field time to hone their newly acquired infantry skills, the trainees also will have more hands-on instruction in buddy care, culminating in an evaluation for each zone to see which zone has won the coveted title of PACER FORGE excellence which is announced at the CULMEX (culminating exercise) ceremony on Friday afternoon. The BEAST site includes a 1.5-mile improvised explosive device (IED) trail littered with simulated roadside bombs. Trainees learn to spot IEDs and then use the trail in training scenarios. For example, under one scenario trainees make their way down the "lane" in tactical formation, trying to identify IEDs from the other debris such as soda cans. At the end of the trail, trainees are broken into teams of two "wingmen" and negotiate a combat-obstacle course (low-crawl, hide behind walls, roll behind barriers, strike dummies with the butt of your rifle, high crawl 60 yards through deep sand up a 40 percent grade). Trainees will also go participate in a CLAW mission during BEAST week. CLAW stands for Creating Leader Airmen Warriors. The CLAW mission consists of traversing a "simulated" river using the instructions and supplies on hand which stresses teamwork. They will then move in staggered tactical formation to another checkpoint where they will work on their SABC skills, then they will go through the combat obstacle course that was mentioned above. The biggest test is the village in which the Chalks of Trainees will have to either rescue a "downed" Airman and evacuate the training dummy or they will have to neutralize the targets and "simulated" gunners in the village while sustaining as few casualties as possible. Teamwork is stressed, as the majority of tasks are completely impossible without it—each group must succeed or fail as a whole. The others will result in failure unless every trainee passes through together, requiring the team to aid its fellow trainee(s) who struggle in the accomplishment of the given mission. On the last day the trainees will have a CULMEX ceremony in which their MTI will award them their dog tags.

=== Sixth Week ===
Week Six of BMT focuses primarily on post-deployment training. During this week, they will receive intensive classroom instruction about the difficulties many military members face when they return from a deployment, such as financial management, family issues and alcohol abuse. Trainees will also continue to practice drill and have dorm inspections. Trainees will also learn about Air Force history and heritage during this week. The final physical fitness test is also given this week. Trainees who fail the final PT test will be transferred to the "Get Fit" flight, thereby providing the trainee extra time to improve fitness scores. The Air Force End of Course exam is also given during the Friday of the 6th week and Trainees will at some point during this week find out their AFSC if one was not already assigned when they arrived at BMT. A 70 or above is required to pass the EOC with Honor Grad candidacy being reached at 90.

=== Seventh Week (final week/graduation) ===
On the final Thursday of BMT, all trainees will participate in the 1.5-mile run known as the "Airman's Run". The run is a victory celebration of the challenges overcome, and esprit de corps gained by Airmen during training. Family and friends will be able to attend the day's events and see their loved ones for the first time since the start of basic training. The Airman's Run will be followed by the Coin and Retreat Ceremony. Trainees will be presented with the Airman's Coin which signifies the transition from Trainee and have earned the right to be called an Airman. After the Airmen are dismissed, they will be able to spend the remainder of the day with loved ones.

Friday is the Graduation Parade. The flights will pass in review, take their final oath of enlistment and are then dismissed which marks the end of Air Force Basic Military Training and the beginning of an Airman's career. Family and friends will be able to see their Airman's living quarters at the dormitory, tour the base and San Antonio following the ceremony. The weekend will be spent returning to the flight in the evening and spending the daylight hours on Base Liberty or Town Pass.

=== Airman's Week ===
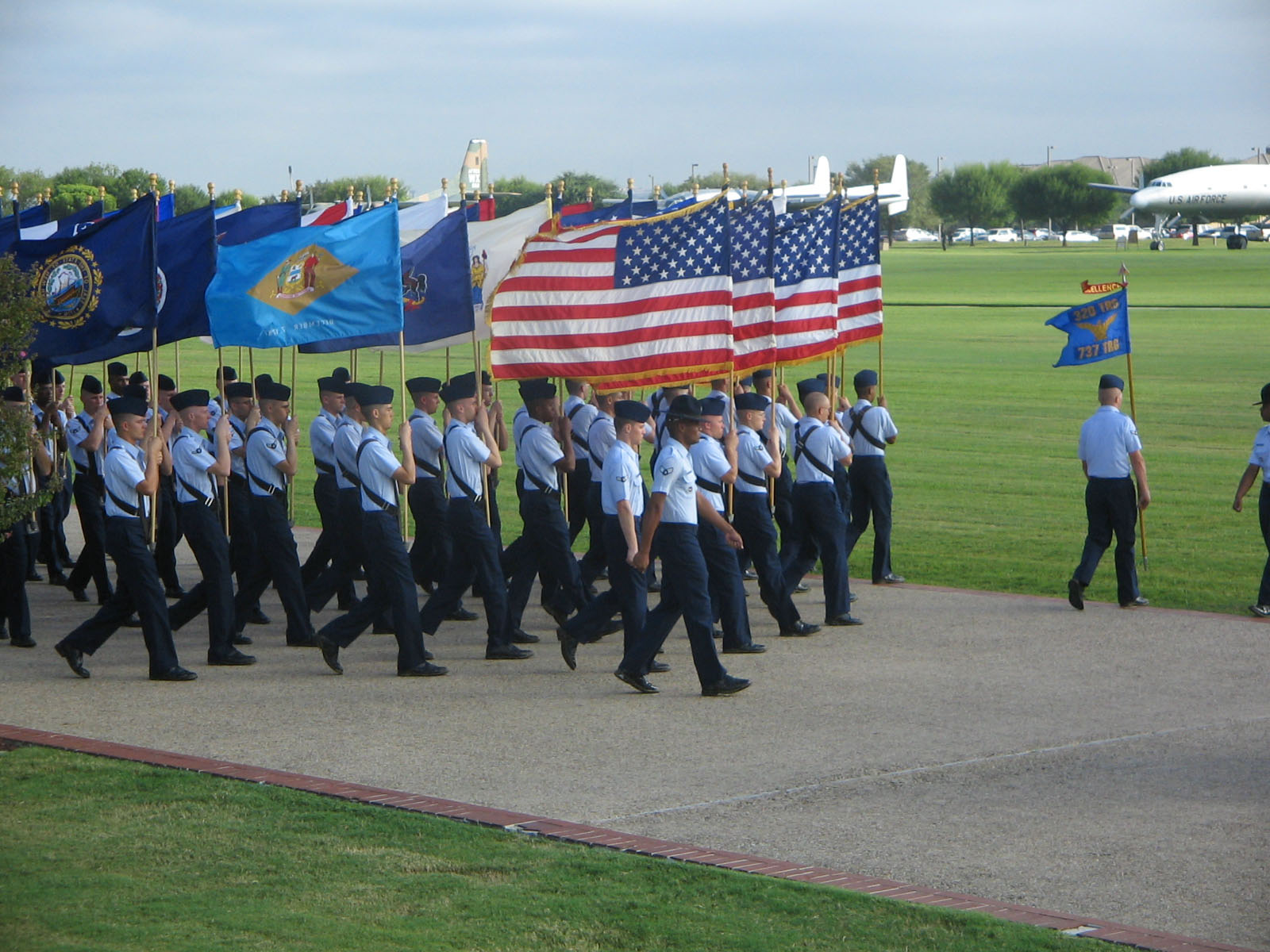
Graduation Ceremony

Starting in March 2015, BMT was altered, graduation occurs during the seventh week and the weekend after graduation, the new Airmen are moved to the Airman's Week dorms generally into a dorm with people going to the same Technical Training bases as themselves. During this week, Airmen participate in classes and activities designed to help them become more independent thinkers and to make them aware of some of the problems facing young Airmen in both Tech Training and beyond, including mental, academic and social stresses that often affect new Airmen. During this week, Airmen are granted more freedoms, including base liberties after duty hours and a more relaxed dining facility. Airmen are no longer required to march and are now allowed to talk to each other, and classroom sessions are mixed gender.

Monday morning following the end of Airman's Week, all Airmen will proceed to the appropriate technical training school for their Air Force Specialty Code. This technical training typically lasts anywhere from one month to over two years.

== Basic training units ==
- 37th Training Wing
  - 737th Training Group
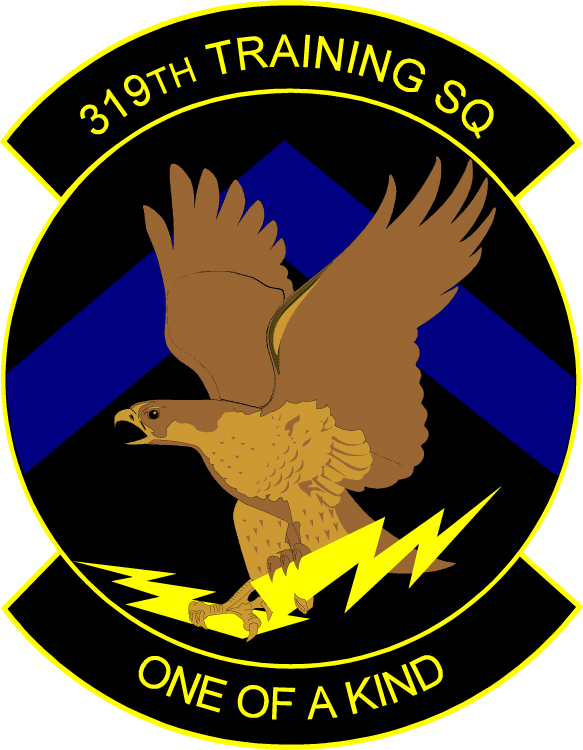
    - 319th Training Squadron Tigers
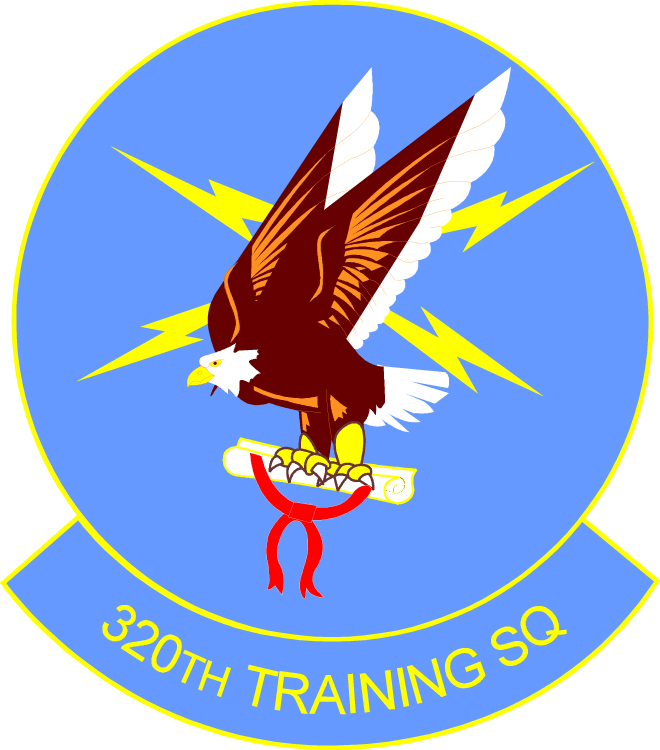
    - 320th Training Squadron Gators
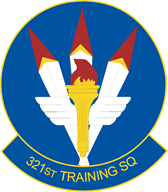
    - 321st Training Squadron Warthogs
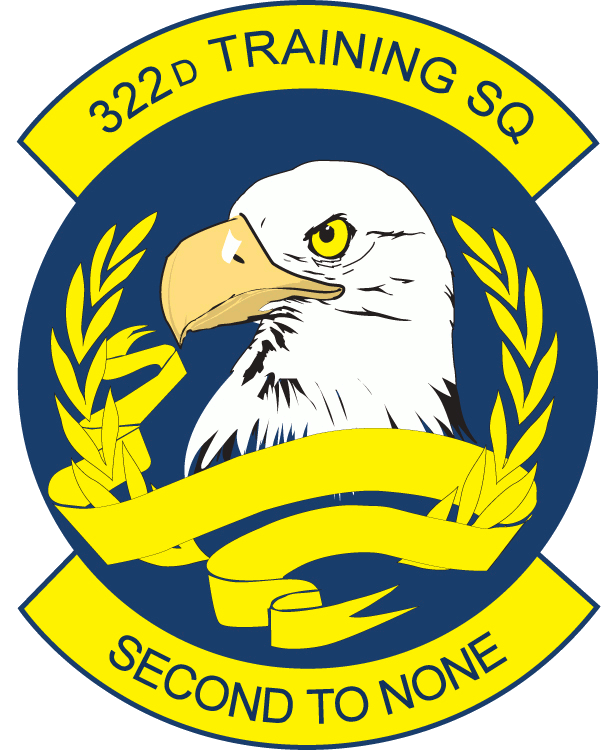
    - 322d Training Squadron Eagles
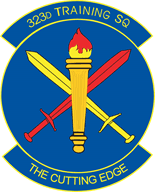
    - 323d Training Squadron Mustangs
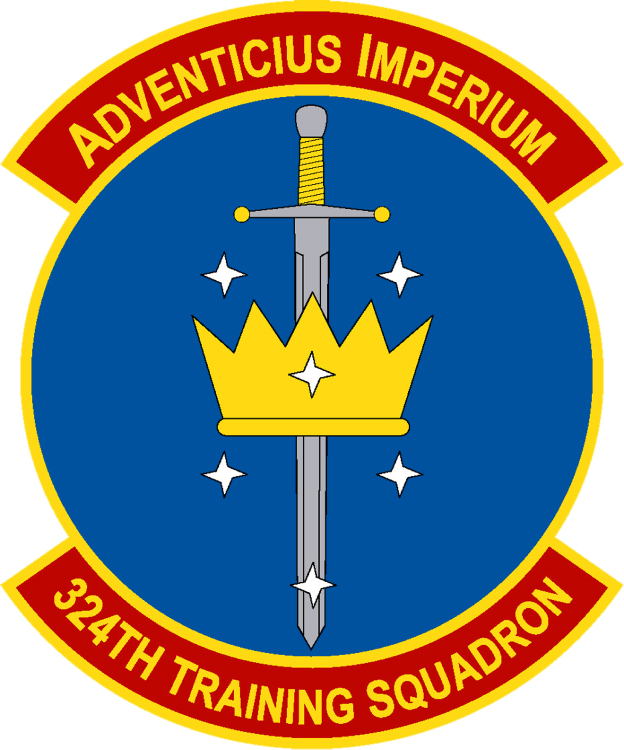
    - 324th Training Squadron Knights
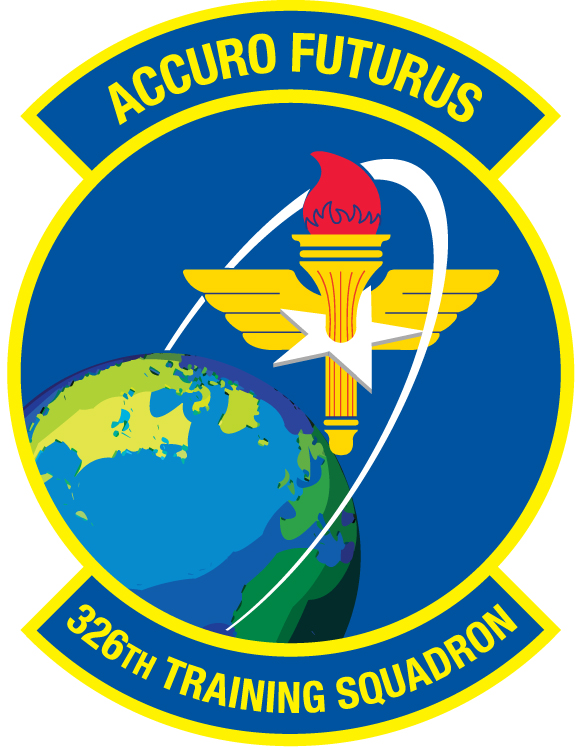
    - 326th Training Squadron Bulldogs
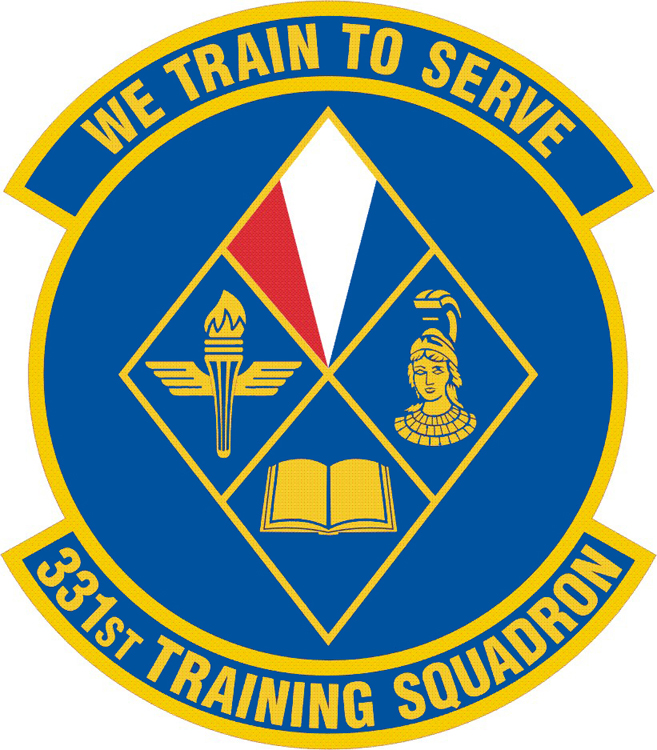
    - 331st Training Squadron Wolfpack

== Prohibited and illegal activities ==
Activities that are prohibited during Basic Training include (but are not limited to):

- Insubordination
- Use or possession of any tobacco or electronic cigarette product
- Use or possession of any alcohol
- Possession/consumption of food, except during designated meal hours (or "chow time") and in designated areas
- Possession of any contraband
- Failure to perform duty (such as neglecting EC watch duties)
- Being absent without leave (AWOL)
- Fraternization

When a trainee engages in a prohibited activity, their MTI may recommend the Commander impose non-judicial punishment (i.e., UCMJ Article 15). An Article 15 disciplinary action may entail any or all of the following:

- Restriction to specific limits (normally work, dorms, place of worship, mess hall, and medical facilities) for up to 45 days
- Extra duty for up to 45 days, usually meaning that the trainee's personal time is replaced with work detail
- Forfeiture of up to one month's pay over a period of two months
- Reduction by one grade of rank (demotion), which also means a permanent pay reduction until the trainee is promoted again
- Verbal or written reprimand

== Discharge from Basic Military Training ==
A trainee can be discharged from the Air Force before the conclusion of Basic Military Training. Discharges that occur before the completion of 180 days (approximately 6 months) of training are considered uncharacterized, which are neither honorable nor less than honorable.

- An Entry Level Separation (ELS) can occur when a trainee demonstrates unsatisfactory performance and/or misconduct. A trainee can only receive an ELS after at least 4 weeks of training and 2 counseling sessions, except under extreme circumstances, such as the trainee being deemed suicidal.
- If it is found that a trainee is unable to train due to a chronic medical condition, he or she may obtain a medical discharge by the recommendation of an Air Force medical doctor. This is also considered an uncharacterized discharge and an ELS is given in these circumstances.
- A discharge due to any condition Existing Prior To Service (EPTS) may occur when a trainee is found to have a prior medical condition existing before enlistment. A trainee may receive a rare honorable discharge for an EPTS condition if they have been in Basic Training for more than 180 days.

== See also ==
- Air Force Training Ribbon
- Officer Training School
- United States Air Force Fitness Assessment
