= ABCP =

ABCP may refer to:

- A Band Called Pain (abbreviated ABCP), an American heavy metal band
- Army Body Composition Program, a US Army program that dictates height and weight standards
- Asset-backed commercial paper
- ABCG2, the human gene ATP-binding cassette, sub-family G (WHITE), member 2, alternately called ABCP)
- As built critical path, part of the critical path method algorithm
- Associativity-Based Clustering Protocol, an extension of associativity-based routing
