= Army Body Composition Program =

Height and weight requirement for the United States Army

The Army Body Composition Program (ABCP) is a United States Army program that dictates height and weight standards for all Active Army, Army National Guard, and Army Reserve Soldiers; the ABCP is covered in Army Regulation (AR) 600-9. The program is designed to enhance and facilitate Soldier "readiness" and maintain optimal well-being and performance under all circumstances by instituting standards and guidelines designed to evaluate a Soldier's height, weight, and ability to pass the Army Physical Fitness Test (APFT).

== History ==
The current publication of AR 600-9 changed the name from "The Army Weight Control Program" to "The Army Body Composition Program." The Army Weight Control Program was first published on 1 September 1986. The primary goal of the Army Weight Control Program was to ensure the following:

Quoted from Army Regulation 600-9, Effective 1 October 1986:

"4. Objectives

a. The primary objective of the Army Weight Control Program is to insure that all personnel—

(1) Are able to meet the physical demands of their duties under combat conditions.

(2) Present a trim military appearance at all times.

b. Excessive body fat—

(1) Connotes a lack of personal discipline.

(2) Detracts from military appearance.

(3) May indicate a poor state of health, physical fitness, or stamina.

c. Objectives of the Army Weight Control Program are to—

(1) Assist in establishing and maintaining—

(a) Discipline.

(b) Operational readiness.

(c) Optimal physical fitness.

(d) Health.

(e) Effectiveness of Army personnel through proper weight control.

(2) Establish appropriate body fat standards.

(3) Provide procedures for which personnel are counseled to assist in meeting the standards prescribed in this regulation.

(4) Foster high standards of professional military appearance expected of all personnel."

Since the original AR 600-9 doctrine has been published, it has undergone many revisions. However, the overall objective of the program remains unchanged - to gauge the overall physical fitness of United States Army Soldiers to retain Soldiers best suited to the physical demands of military service.

== Standards ==
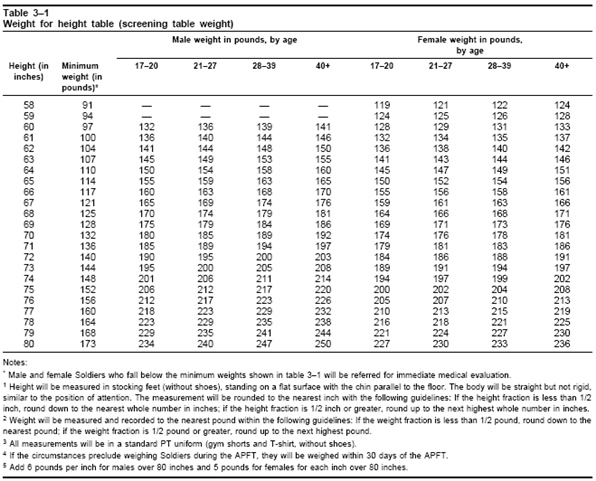
AR 600-9.

The ABCP establishes height and weight standards for both male and female Soldiers. A current height and weight is utilized to determine whether or not a Soldier is program compliant. The Soldier's height is referenced in Table 3-1, Weight for height table (screening table weight). If the Soldier's maximum allowable weight-by-height is exceeded, the Soldier must undergo a "taping" process to measure the Soldier's Body fat percentage. On the contrary, if a Soldier fails to meet the minimum weight-by-height, the Soldier "will be referred for immediate medical evaluation."

=== Taping ===
The taping procedures for males and females differ. Due to the anatomy of the human body, the circumference sites, or the areas where measurements are taken, are not the same for males and females. There are, however, several commonalities in the taping process.:

1. The tape measure: The preferable material is fiberglass. Fiberglass is non-stretch, unlike its cloth or steel counterparts.

2. Measurement sets: For each circumference site, a total of three measurements are taken. A method is provided to round measurements to the nearest half-inch. Neck measurements are rounded up, while all other circumference measurements are rounded down to the nearest half-inch.

3. Calculation: An average for each circumference site is calculated and used to determine the measurements subjected to Table 3-1. For example, if a Soldier's neck measurements are 17 inches, 17.5 inches, and 17.5 inches, the measurement is calculated as follows:

$$17 + 17.5 + 17.5 = 52 \,$$
$$52 / 3 = 17.33 \,$$

As previously mentioned, the neck circumference measurement is the only measurement that is rounded up to the nearest half-inch. Thus, the neck circumference above is rounded up to 17.5

==== Males ====
There are two circumference sites for male Soldiers:

1. Neck

2. Abdomen

==== Females ====
There are three circumference sites for female Soldiers:

1. Neck

2. Waist

3. Hip
