= Duke Activity Status Index =

- Purpose: used to evaluate the functional capacity of those with cardiovascular disease

The Duke Activity Status Index (DASI) is an assessment tool used to evaluate the functional capacity of patients with cardiovascular disease (CVD), such as coronary artery disease, myocardial infarction, and heart failure.

In clinical practice, DASI can be used to assess the effects of medical treatments and cardiac rehabilitation as well. Positive responses are summed up to get a total score, which ranges from 0 to 58.2. Higher scores would indicate a higher functional capacity.

The instrument is copyrighted by one of its authors, Mark Hlatky.
