= Soldier Readiness Processing =

Soldier Readiness Processing (SRP) is a program within the United States Army, including its reserve components (the Army Reserve and Army National Guard) to qualify soldiers for pending deployments. SRP Level 1 should be completed at the unit level; SRP Level 2 is most often completed at an established location with identified stations.

The SRP consists of several different examinations, evaluations, and interviews. These sections are broken into two areas, administrative and medical, and, when combined, may take as few as two hours or as long as eight hours, depending on the information and advanced specialized testing that an individual soldier may require:

- The administrative section of the SRP encompasses the least time spent in the SRP process. A soldier may typically complete these stations in as little as 25 minutes or as long as two hours. The soldier will visit several stations during the administrative portion of the SRP, including legal, chaplain, life insurance, family situation changes, and security clearances. During each of these stations, the representative will ask the soldier if he/she has any new information to add or delete from the current information on file. If the soldier wishes to file a new will, the attorney at the legal section will draft a will for the soldier.
- The medical section of the SRP includes a series of medical examinations and evaluations consistent with the PULHES Factor rating scheme, which is used to qualify an soldier's physical profile for each military skill. PULHES stands for physical capacity, upper body, lower body, hearing, eyes, and psychiatric. The soldier can also anticipate to receive immunizations, the taking of a blood sample, electrocardiography (if needed), and a dental exam. Upon completion of this section, the soldier will meet with a health care provider. The provider will review all of the data collected on the soldier throughout the SRP to determine the overall deployability of the soldier. The soldier is then classified as medically deployable or non-deployable.

Even though a deployment for the soldier's unit may or may not necessarily be imminent or pending, soldiers are still required to complete one SRP annually.
