= PULHES Factor =

United States military acronym

PULHES is a United States military acronym used in the Military Physical Profile Serial System. It is used to qualify an enlistee's physical profile for each military skill. Each letter in the acronym (see box below) is paired with a number from 1 to 4 to designate the service member's physical capacity. For instance, the MOS 19D Cavalry Scout requires a physical profile of 111121 or better, indicating that the service member may wear glasses (a "2" in the E category) but otherwise must have no medical, physical, or psychiatric limitations.

== Using numbers ==
Four numerical designations are used to reflect different levels of functional capacity. The basic purpose of the physical profile serial is to provide an index to overall functional capacity. Therefore, the functional capacity of a particular organ or system of the body, rather than the defect per se, is evaluated in determining the numerical designation 1, 2, 3, or 4.

For example, if a military job requires a physical profile of "123123," that means, in order to qualify for that job, a person must have a medical rating of "1" in the area of "Physical capacity or stamina," a medical rating of "2" or better in the area of "Upper extremities," have a medical rating of "3" or better in the area of "Lower extremities," a rating of "1" in the area of "Hearing and Ears," etc.

As for the numerical designators, they generally mean a military medical evaluation of:

- An individual having a numerical designation of "1" under all factors is considered to possess a high level of medical fitness.
- A physical profile designator of "2" under any or all factors indicates that an individual possesses some medical condition or physical defect that may require some activity limitations.
- A profile containing one or more numerical designators of "3" signifies that the individual has one or more medical conditions or physical defects that may require significant limitations. For those applying for military service, this designation is usually a disqualification. For individuals already in the service, the individual should receive assignments commensurate with his or her physical capability for military duty (i.e., limited duty/assignments)
- A profile serial containing one or more numerical designators of "4" indicates that the individual has one or more medical conditions or physical defects of such severity that performance of military duty must be drastically limited, and usually disqualifies applicants.

== Specific definitions used by the military ==
These definitions appear to differ somewhat between branches of the military. In general, the categories are the same but criteria for the numerical designators may differ. For Army definitions, see AR 40-501, Table 7-1. The below definitions are derived from Air Force Instruction 48-123 Medical Examinations and Standards "Table 1.1. Physical Profile Serial Chart." and Attachment 3 "HEARING PROFILE".

=== P. Physical condition ===
- P-1. Free of any identified organic defect or systemic disease.
- P-2. Presence of stable, minimally significant organic defect(s) or systemic diseases(s). Capable of all basic work commensurate with grade and position. May be used to identify minor conditions that might limit some deployments to specific locations (i.e. G6PD deficiency).
- P-3. Significant defect(s) or disease(s) are under good control. Capable of all basic work commensurate with grade and position.
- P-4. Organic defect(s), systemic and infectious disease(s) which have already undergone an MEB (Medical Evaluation Board).

=== U. Upper extremities ===
- U-1. Bones, joints, and muscles normal. Able to do hand-to-hand fighting.
- U-2. Slightly limited mobility of joints, mild muscular weakness or other musculoskeletal defects that do not prevent hand-to-hand fighting and are compatible with prolonged effort. Capable of all basic work commensurate with grade and position.
- U-3. Defect(s) causing moderate interference with function, yet capable of strong effort for short periods. Capable of all basic work commensurate with grade and position.
- U-4. Strength, range of motion, and general efficiency of hand, arm, shoulder girdle, and back, includes cervical and thoracic spine severely compromised which has already undergone an MEB (Medical Evaluation Board).

=== L. Lower extremities ===
- L-1. Bones, muscles, and joints normal. Capable of performing long marches, continuous standing, running, climbing, and digging without limitation.
- L-2. Slightly limited mobility of joints, mild muscular weakness, or other musculoskeletal defects that do not prevent moderate marching, climbing, digging, or prolonged effort. Capable of all basic work commensurate with grade and position.
- L-3. Defect(s) causing moderate interference with function, yet capable of strong effort for short periods. Capable of all basic work commensurate with grade and position.
- L-4. Strength, range of movement, and efficiency of feet, legs, pelvic girdle, lower back, and lumbar vertebrae severely compromised which has already undergone an MEB (Medical Evaluation Board).

=== H. Hearing (ears) ===
- H-1. Audiometer average level for each ear not more than 25 dB at 500, 1000, 2000 Hz with no individual level greater than 30 dB. Not over 45 dB at 4000 Hz.
- H-2. Audiometer average level for each ear at 500, 1000, 2000 Hz, or not more than 30 dB, with no individual level greater than 35 dB at these frequencies, and level not more than 55 dB at 4000 Hz; or audiometer level 30 dB at 500 Hz, 25 dB at 1000 and 2000 Hz, and 35 dB at 4000 Hz in better ear. (Poorer ear may be deaf.)
- H-3. Speech reception threshold in best ear not greater than 30 dB HL, measured with or without hearing aid; or acute or chronic ear disease.
- H-4. Functional level below the standards of "3".
- A3.1.1. Definition: Unaided hearing loss in either ear with no single value greater than:

500 Hz	1000 Hz	2000 Hz	3000 Hz	4000 Hz	6000 Hz
25 dB	25 dB	25 dB	35 dB	45 db	45 db

- A3.2. H-2 Profile

500 Hz	1000 Hz	2000 Hz	3000 Hz	4000 Hz	6000 Hz
35 dB	35 dB	35 dB	45 dB	55 db	--;db

- An H-3 profile is any loss that exceeds the values noted above in the definition of an H-2 profile but does not qualify for H-4.
- An H-4 profile is hearing loss sufficient to preclude safe and effective performance of duty, regardless of level of pure tone hearing loss, and despite use of hearing aids. This degree of hearing loss is disqualifying for all military duty.

=== E. Eyes ===
- E-1. Uncorrected visual acuity 20/200 correctable to 20/20 in each eye.
- E-2. Distant visual acuity correctable to not worse than 20/40 in one eye and 20/70 in the other, or 20/30 in one eye and 20/100 in the other eye, or 20/20 in one eye and 20/400 in the other eye.
- E-3. Uncorrected distant visual acuity of any degree that is correctable not less than 20/40 in the better eye.
- E-4. Visual defects worse than E-3 which has already undergone an MEB or ALC fast track as determined by the DAWG.

=== S. Psychiatric / Stability ===
- S-1. Diagnosis or treatment results in no impairment or potential impairment of duty function, risk to the mission or ability to maintain security clearance.
- S-2. World Wide Qualified and diagnosis or treatment results in low risk of impairment or potential impairment that necessitates command consideration of changing or limiting duties.
- S-3. World Wide Qualified and diagnosis or treatment results in high risk due to potential impairment of duty function, risk to the mission or ability to maintain security clearance.
- S-4. Diagnosis or treatment results in high to extremely high risk to the military or patient due to potential impairment of duty function, risk to the mission or ability to maintain security clearance and which has already undergone an MEB (Medical Evaluation Board).

== Sources ==
- Army Regulation 600-60 Physical Profiling Evaluation System
