= Functional capacity evaluation =

A functional capacity evaluation (FCE) is a set of tests, practices and observations that are combined to determine the ability of the evaluated person to function in a variety of circumstances, most often employment, in an objective manner. Physicians change diagnoses based on FCEs. They are also required by insurers in when an insured person applies for disability payments or a disability pension in the case of permanent disability.

== Purpose ==
An FCE can be used to determine fitness to work following an extended period of medical leave. If an employee is unable to return to work, the FCE provides information on prognosis, and occupational rehabilitation measures that may be possible. An FCE can also be used to help identify changes to employee workload, or modifications to working conditions such as ergonomic measures, that the employer may be able to undertake in an effort to accommodate an employee with a disability or medical condition. FCEs are needed to determine if an employee is able to resume working in a capacity "commensurate with his or her skills or abilities" before the disability or medical condition was diagnosed. An FCE involves assessments made by one or more medical doctors. There are two types of FCE used by the United States Social Security Administration: the Mental Functional Capacity Evaluation (MFCE) that measures emotional and mental capacity, and the Physical Functional Capacity Evaluation (PFCE) that measures physical functioning.

Studies have been undertaken to assess the accuracy of FCEs in predicting the longterm outcomes for patients, both in terms of returning to work, and in probability of permanent disability. Questions that have been raised include how to identify medical and societal variables in predicting disability.

FCEs may be required by law for some employers before an employee can return to work, as well as by insurers before insurance payments can be made. FCEs are also used to determine eligibility for disability insurance, or pension eligibility in the event that an employee is permanently unable to return to work. The United States Social Security Administration has its own FCE, called the Assessment of Disability. A newer FCE model is the World Health Organization's International Classification of Functioning, Disability and Health.

During most FCEs, the following measurements are also taken:

- Lifting power
- Push and pull power
- How long one can stand, sit or walk
- Flexibility and reaching
- Grasping and holding capabilities
- Bending capabilities
- Balance capabilities

== Metabolic Equivalents (METs) ==
Functional capacity can also be expressed as "METs" and can be used as a reliable predictor of future cardiac events. One MET is defined as the amount of oxygen consumed while sitting at rest, and is equal to 3.5 ml oxygen per kilogram body weight per minute. In other words, a means of expressing energy cost of physical activity as a multiple of the resting rate. For instance; walking on level ground at about 6 km/h or carrying groceries up a flight of stairs expends about 4 METs of activity. Generally, >7 METs of activity tolerance is considered excellent while <4 is considered poor for surgical candidates. Determining one's functional capacity can elucidate the degree of surgical risk one might undertake for procedures that risk blood loss, intravascular fluid shifts, etc. and may tax an already strained cardiovascular system.

== See also ==
- Duke Activity Status Index
