= United States Air Force Fitness Assessment =

U.S. Air Force fitness test

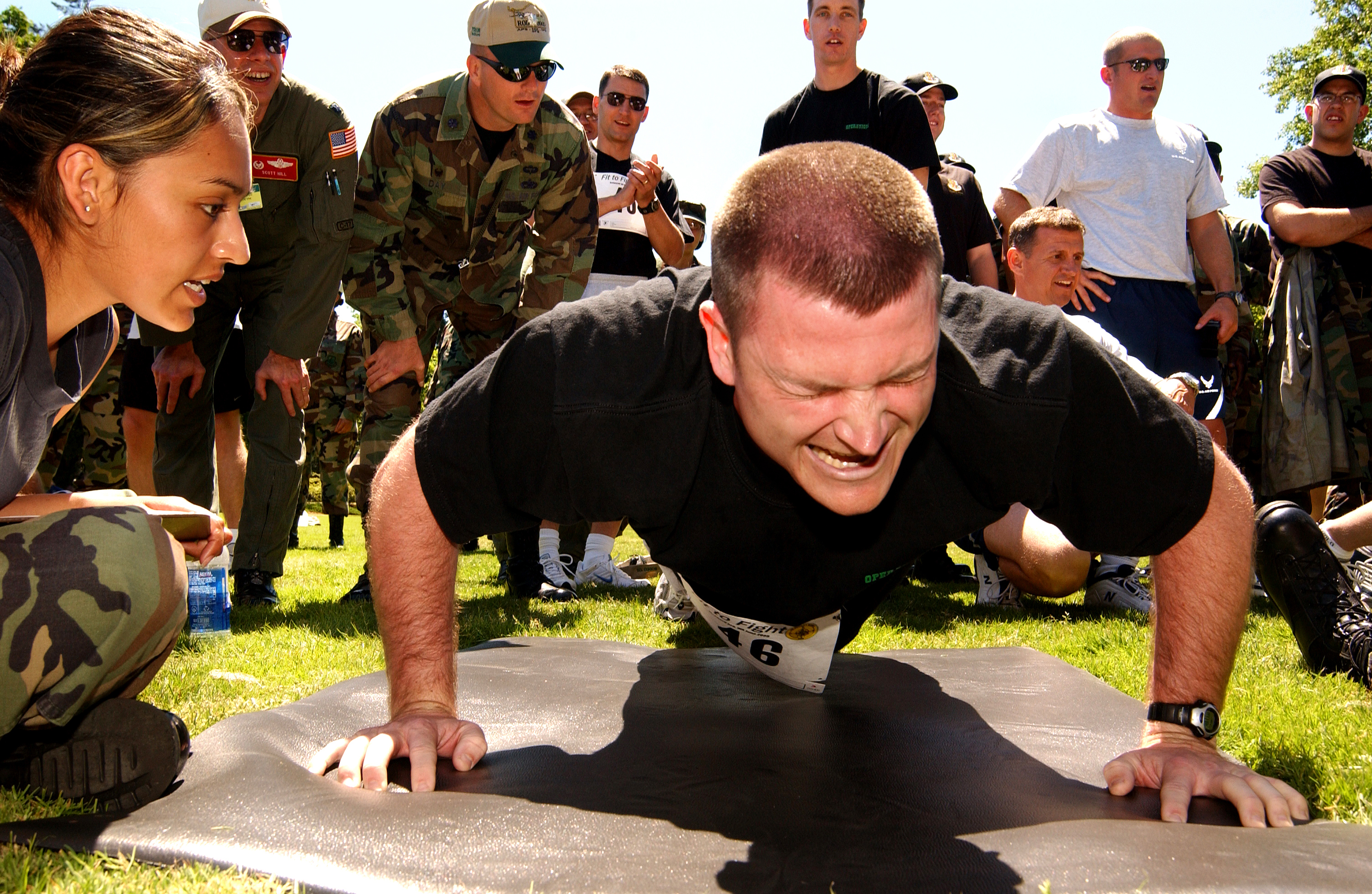
Airman executing a push-up

The United States Air Force Physical Fitness Assessment (PFA) is designed to test the body composition, muscular strength/endurance, and cardiovascular respiratory fitness of airmen in the United States Air Force. As part of the Fit to Fight program, the Air Force adopted a more stringent physical fitness assessment in 2004 and replaced the annual ergo-cycle (stationary bike) test that the Air Force had used for several years. Results are stored in the Air Force Fitness Management System (AFFMS) and accessible via the AF Portal.

== Test ==
Some reports state that participation at USAF fitness centers is up 30 percent since the new program was established. In the Air Force, Airmen are given a score based on performance consisting of four components: waist circumference, situps, pushups, and a 2 mile run. Airmen can potentially earn a score of 100; a passing score is anything over 75 points. Members must complete all components unless medically exempted. If medically exempted from any component, the total score is calculated as follows: Total Component Points Achieved X 100 divided by total possible points.

Maximum component points as of 1 July 2026 are:

- Aerobic—50
- Waist to height ratio—20
- Push-ups—15
- Crunches—15

Airmen who are medically recommended not to run may be cleared to participate in an alternative aerobic fitness assessment. Choice of the alternative test rests with the unit commander, based upon medical guidance.

== Ratings ==
The ratings for the FA are as follows

- Excellent: 90 or above
- Satisfactory: 75 to 89.9
- Unsatisfactory: below 75

Originally, Airmen who scored below 70 on the FA scored Poor, and those who scored between 70 and 74.9 received a Marginal rating, while Airmen who scored above 75 passed. If an Airman meets all of the minimum repetitions, that is considered a fail due to not having the Satisfactory score of 75. If an Airman fails one component (Example: fails sit-ups) that Airman fails the Fitness Assessment. Airmen who score a Satisfactory or Excellent rating will test again in 6 months. All of this can be referenced in AFI 36-2905. In its current state, a score below 75 is considered Poor, and Airmen are required to re-test within 90 days. Scoring 75 or higher is now considered as meeting standards.

== Brief history ==
Air Force fitness dates back to 1947 when the Air Force was still part of the Army. In his autobiography, 1st Chairman of the Joint Chiefs of Staff, Army General Omar Bradley, expressed frustration in the deteriorating health of the overall fighting forces and poor physical condition, explaining that troops would not meet the strenuous exertion that combat would introduce. The Air Force originally followed the Army PT standards of the time; however, when it became a separate service in 1947, the Air Force major commands (MAJCOM) implemented PT under their own discretion. It wasn't until 1962 that a regimented PT mandate was put in place service-wide.
