= Timeline of women in warfare and the military in the United States, 2011–present =

This article lists events involving Women in warfare and the military in the United States since 2011. For the previous decade, see Timeline of women in warfare and the military in the United States, 2000–2010.

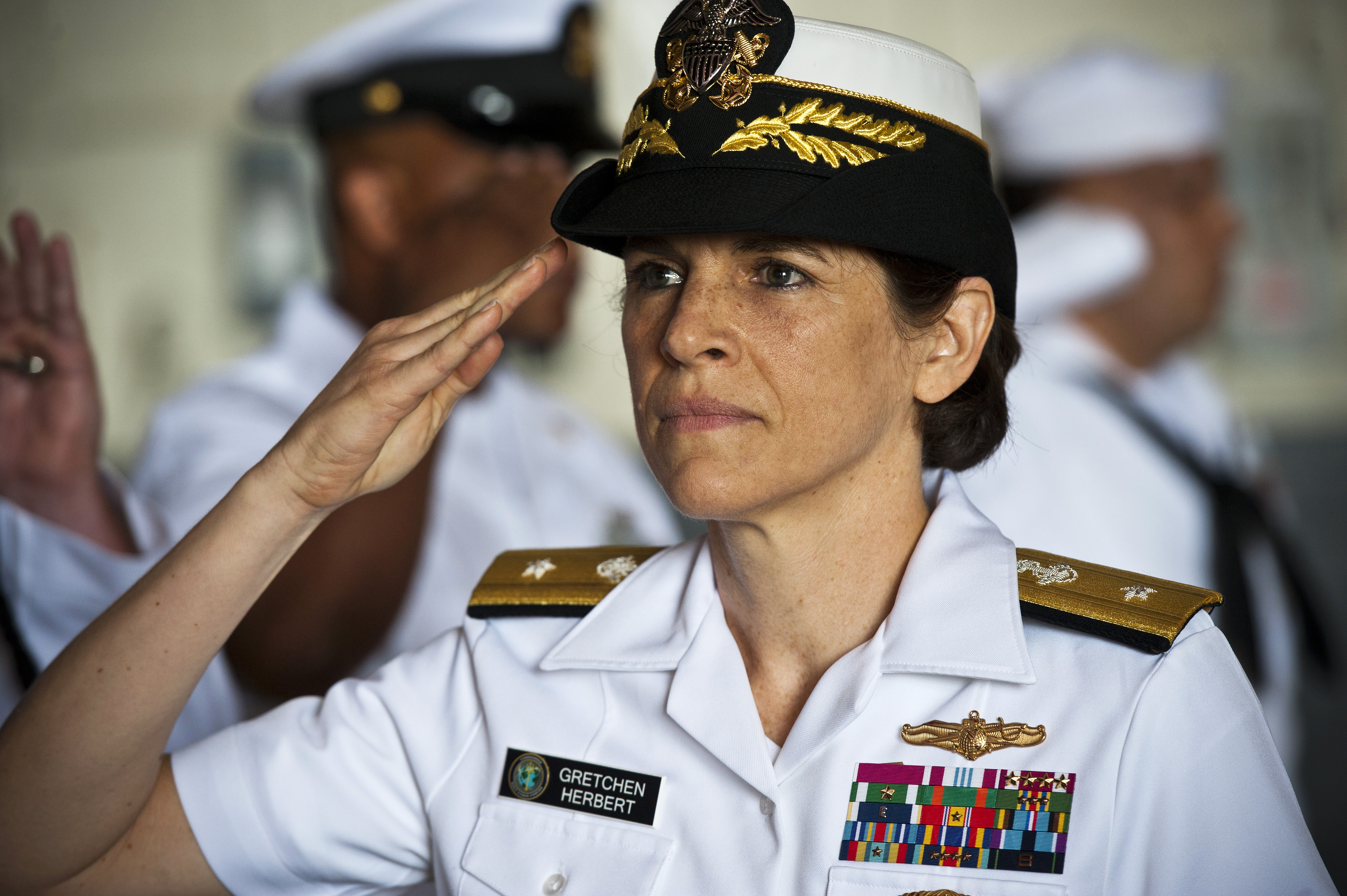
RDML Gretchen S. Herbert, USN

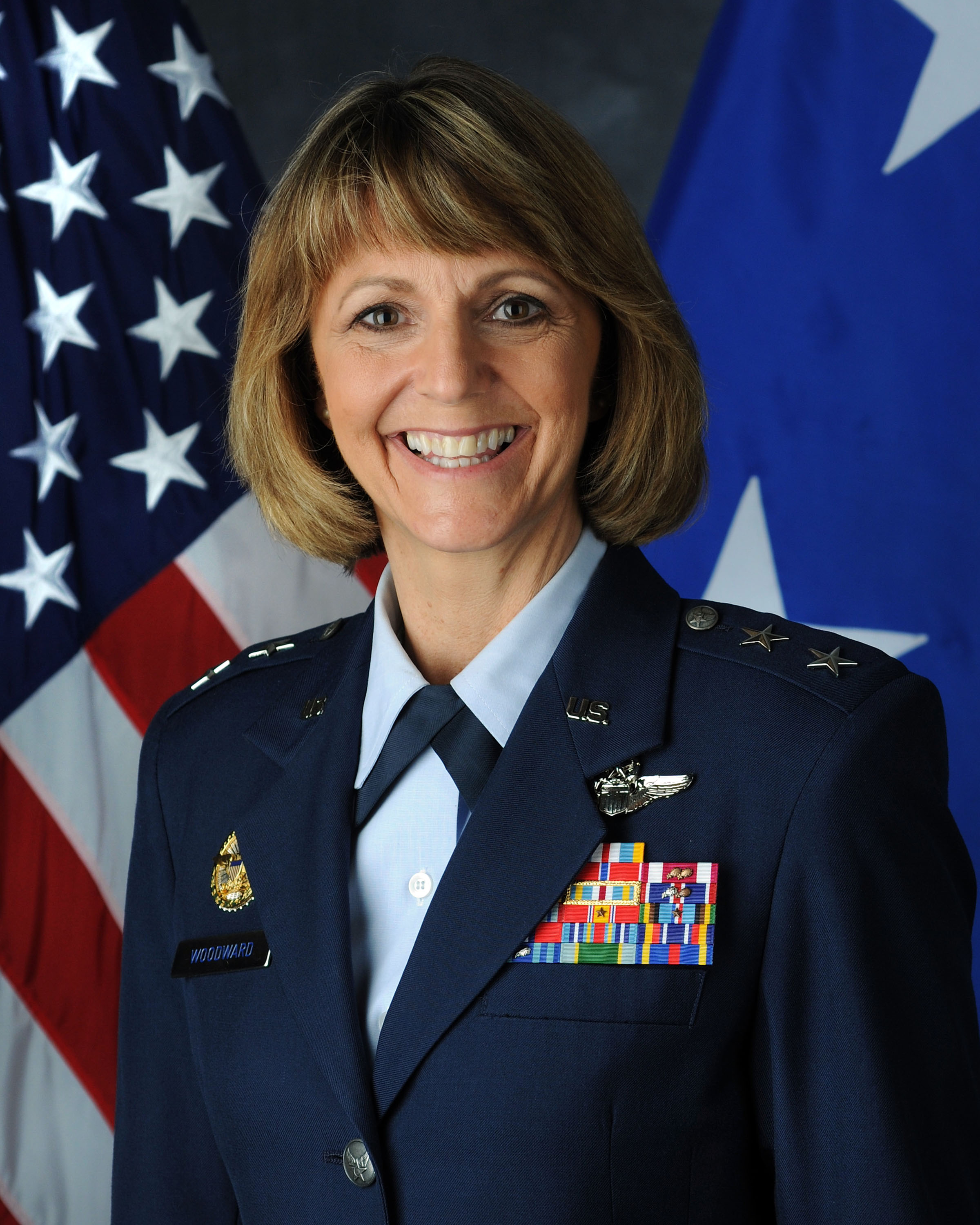
Maj Gen Margaret H. Woodward, USAF

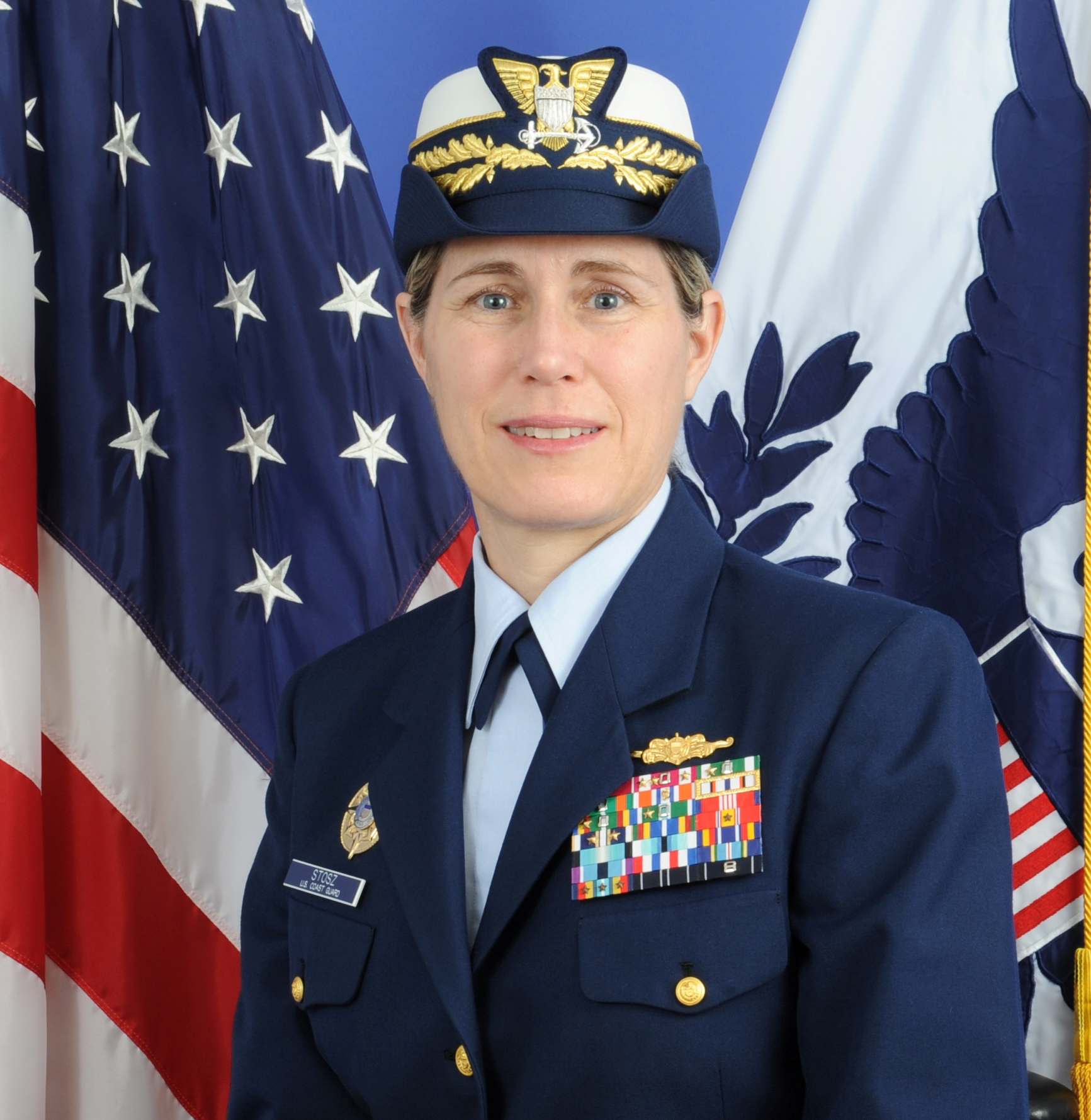
RADM Sandra L. Stosz, USCG

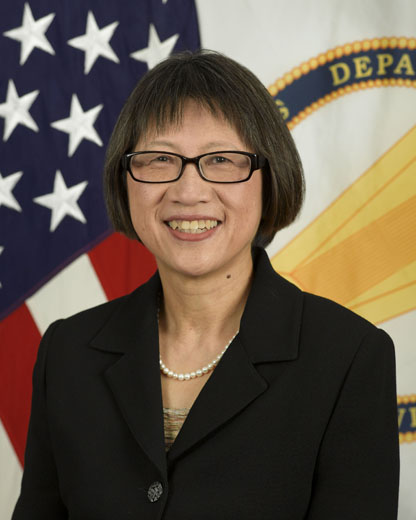
Heidi Shyu, United States Assistant Secretary of the Army for Acquisition, Logistics, and Technology

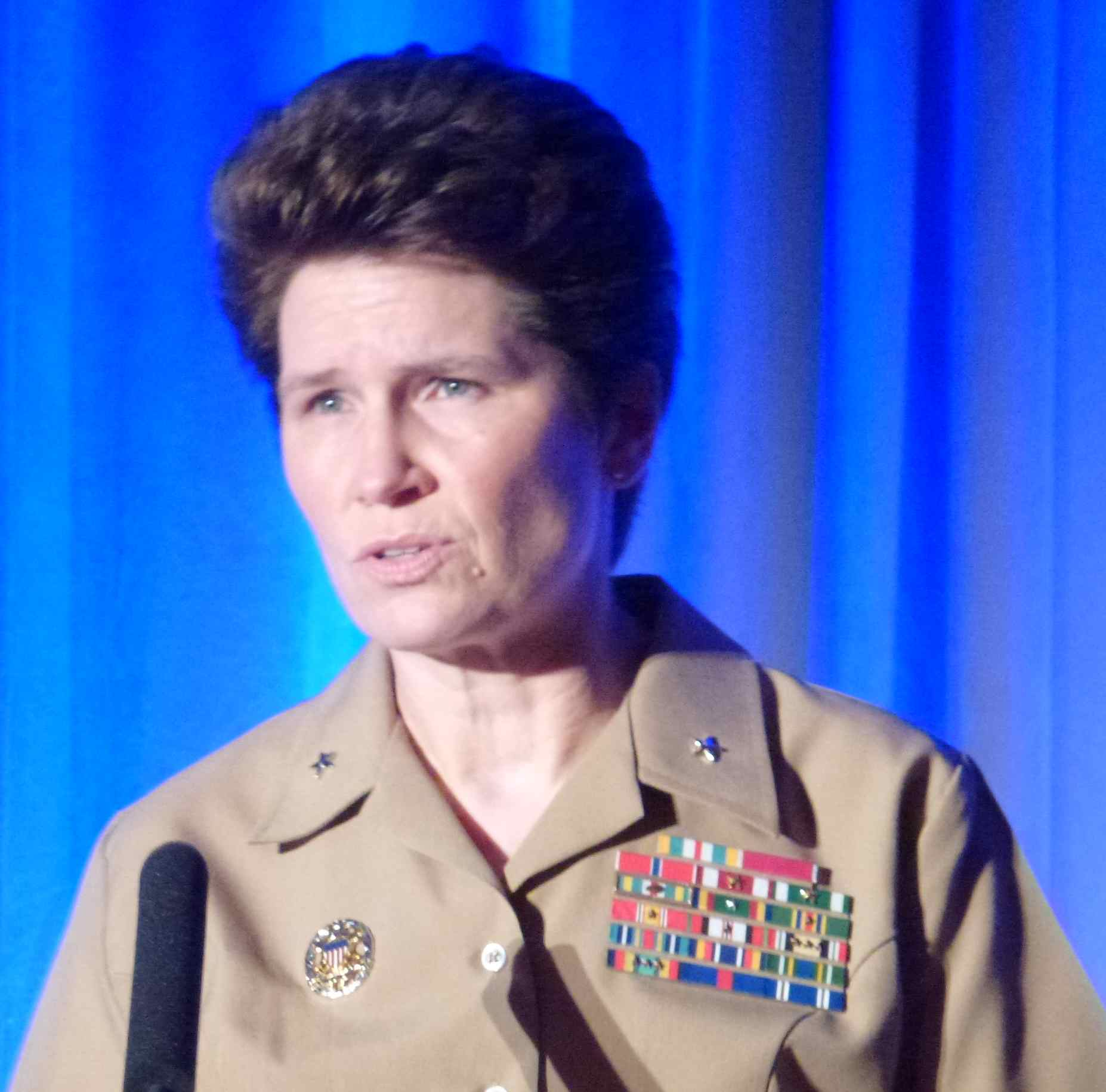
BGen Loretta Reynolds, USMC

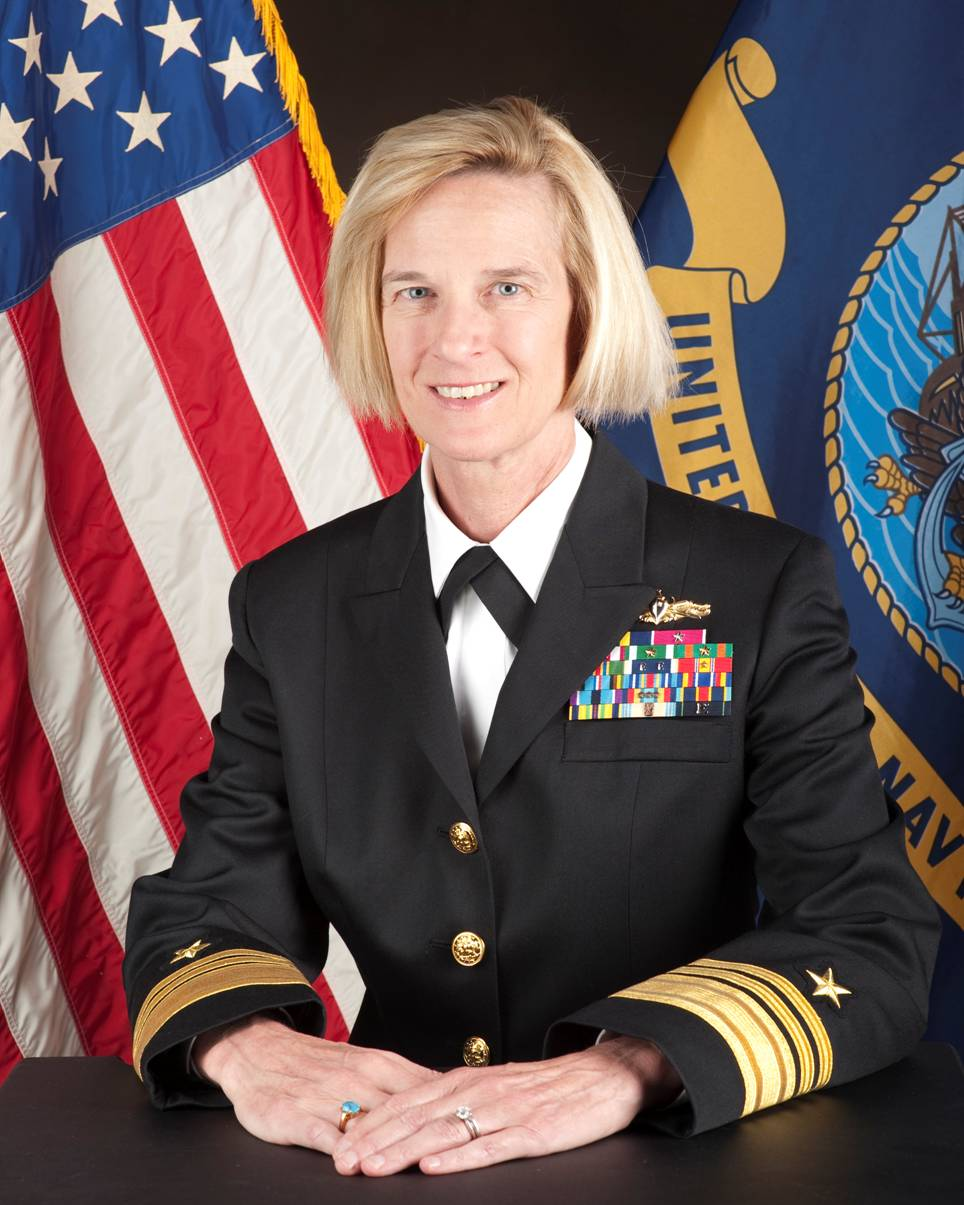
VADM Carol M. Pottenger USN (Ret.)

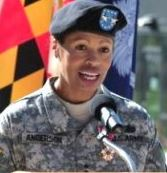
MG Marcia Anderson, United States Army

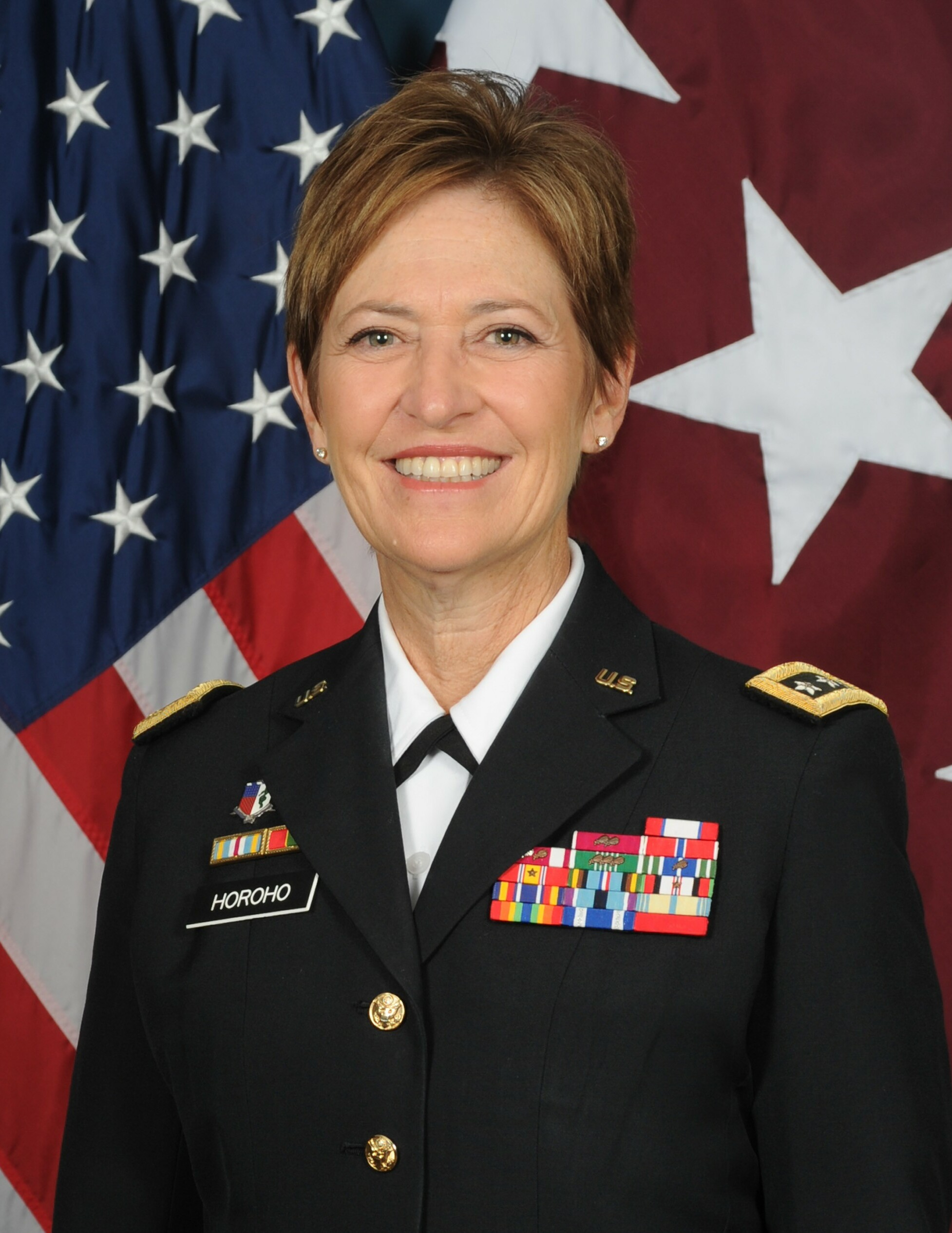
LTG Patricia Horoho, United States Army

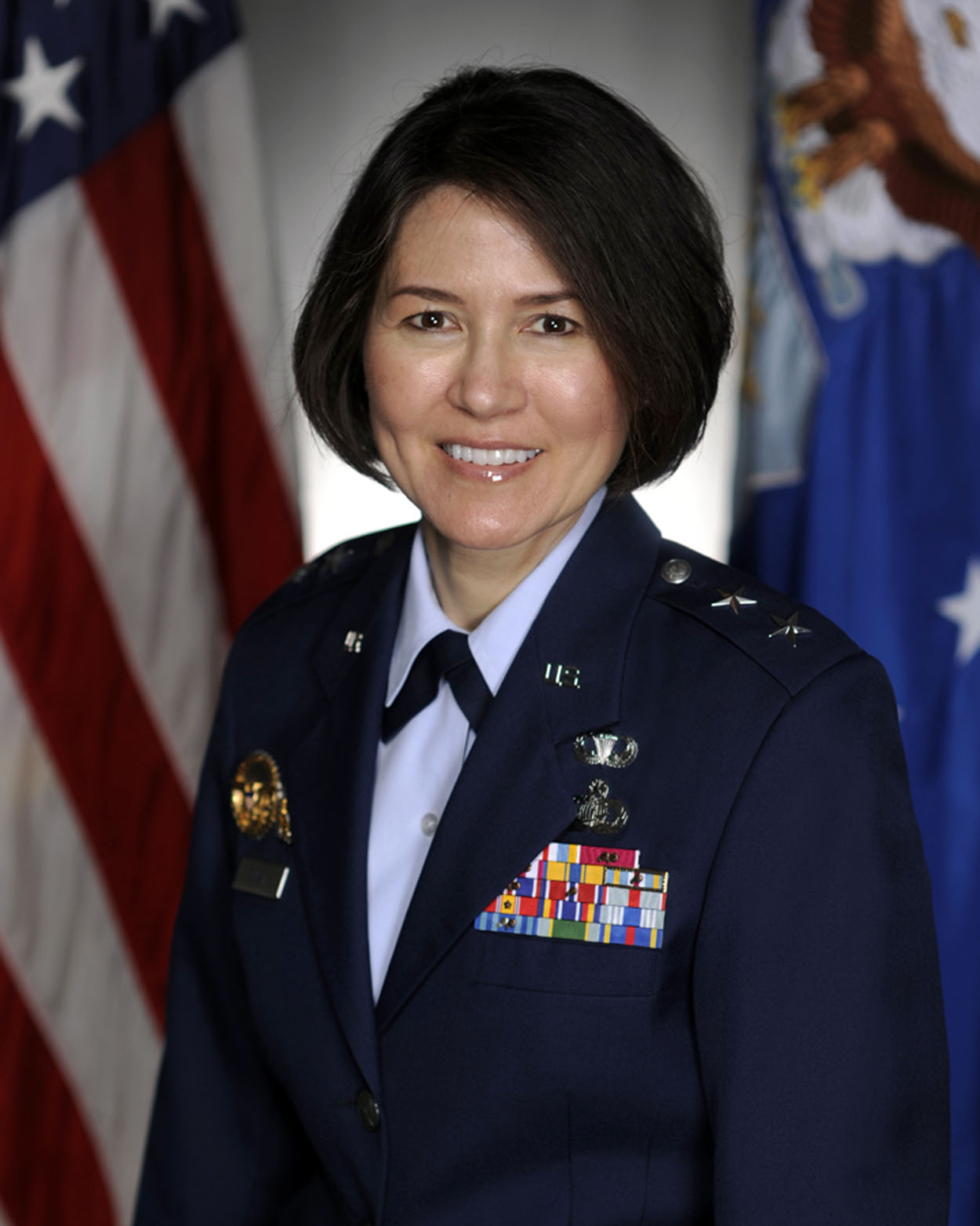
Maj Gen Sharon K.G. Dunbar, USAF

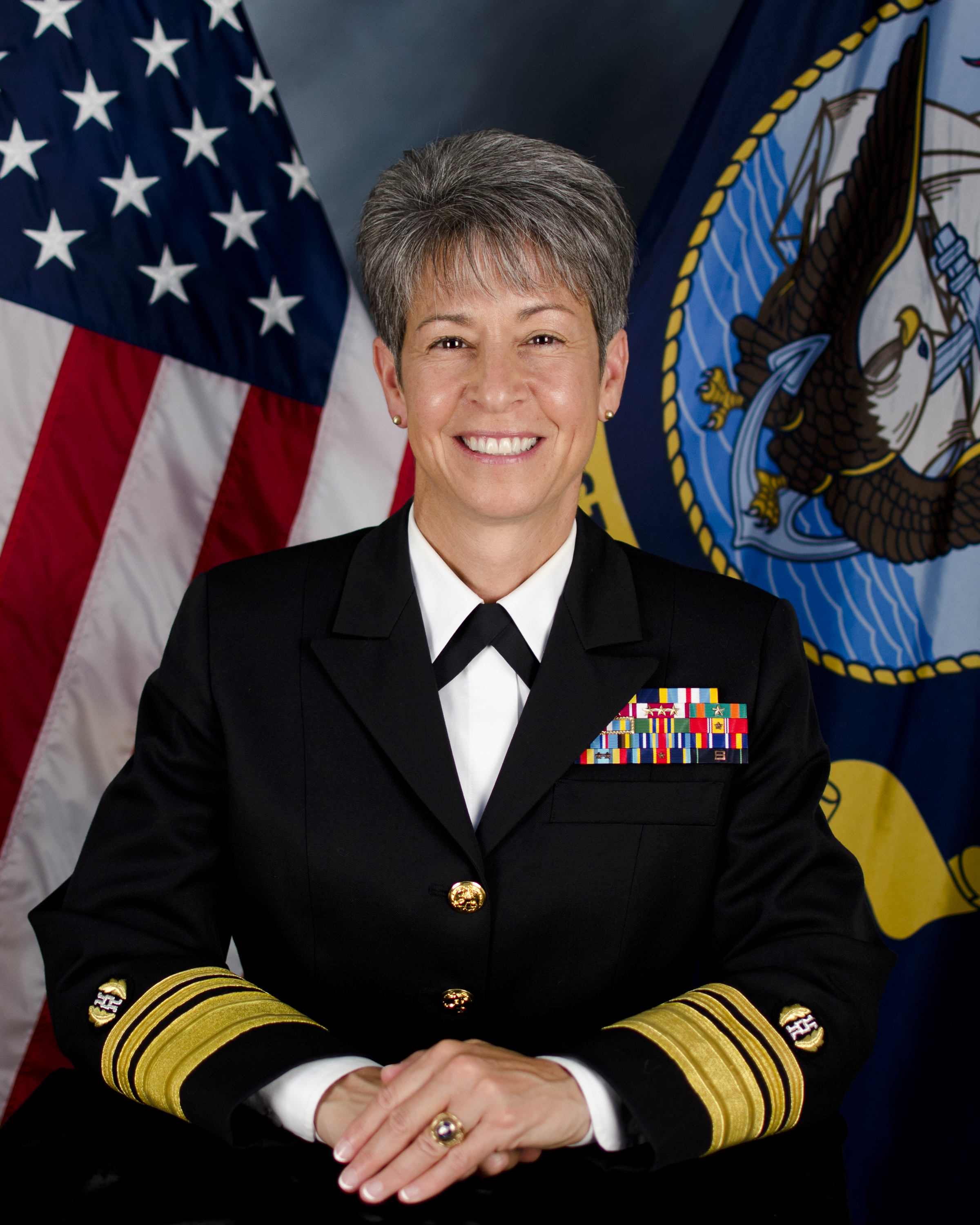
VADM Nanette M. DeRenzi, USN

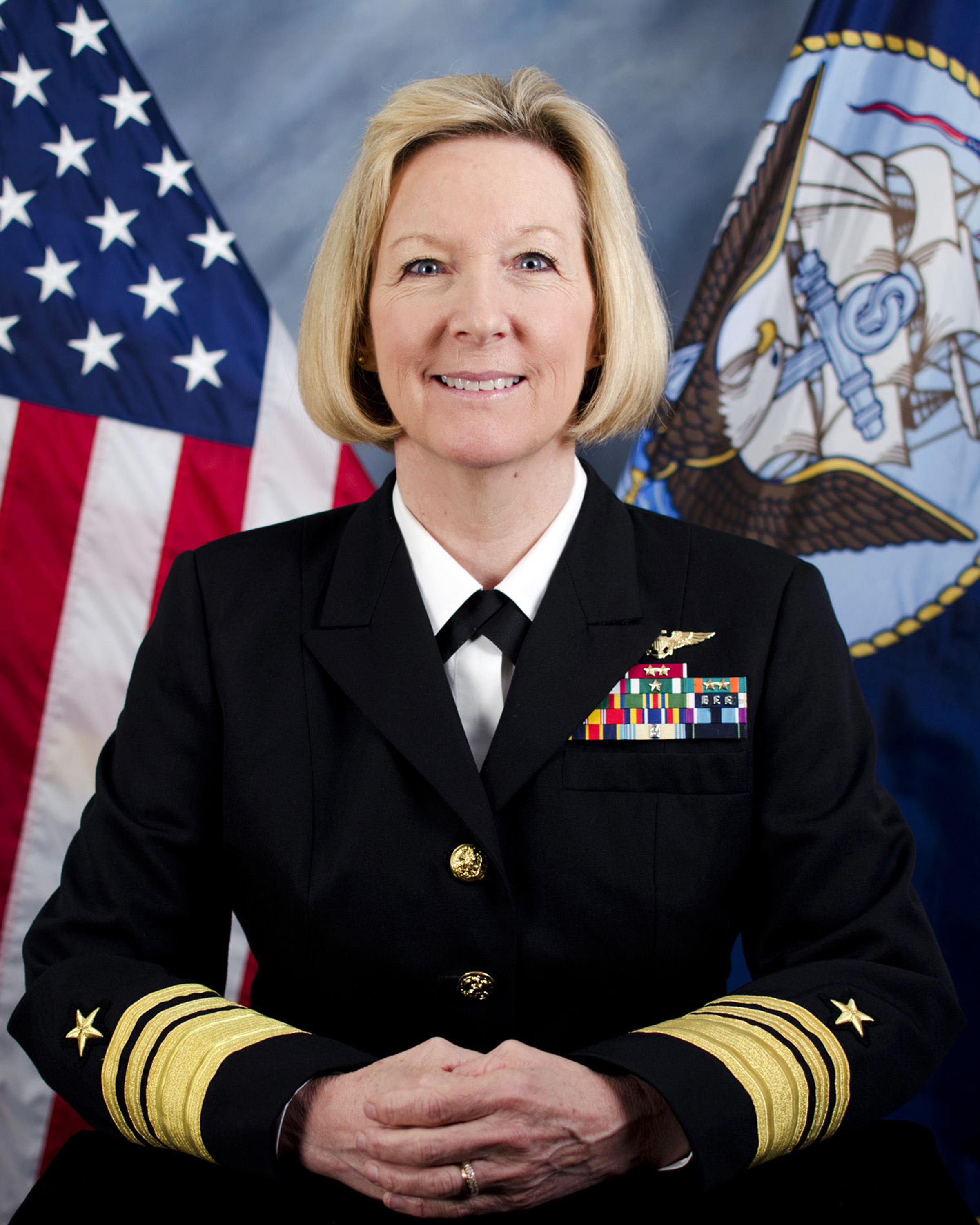
VADM Robin Braun, USN

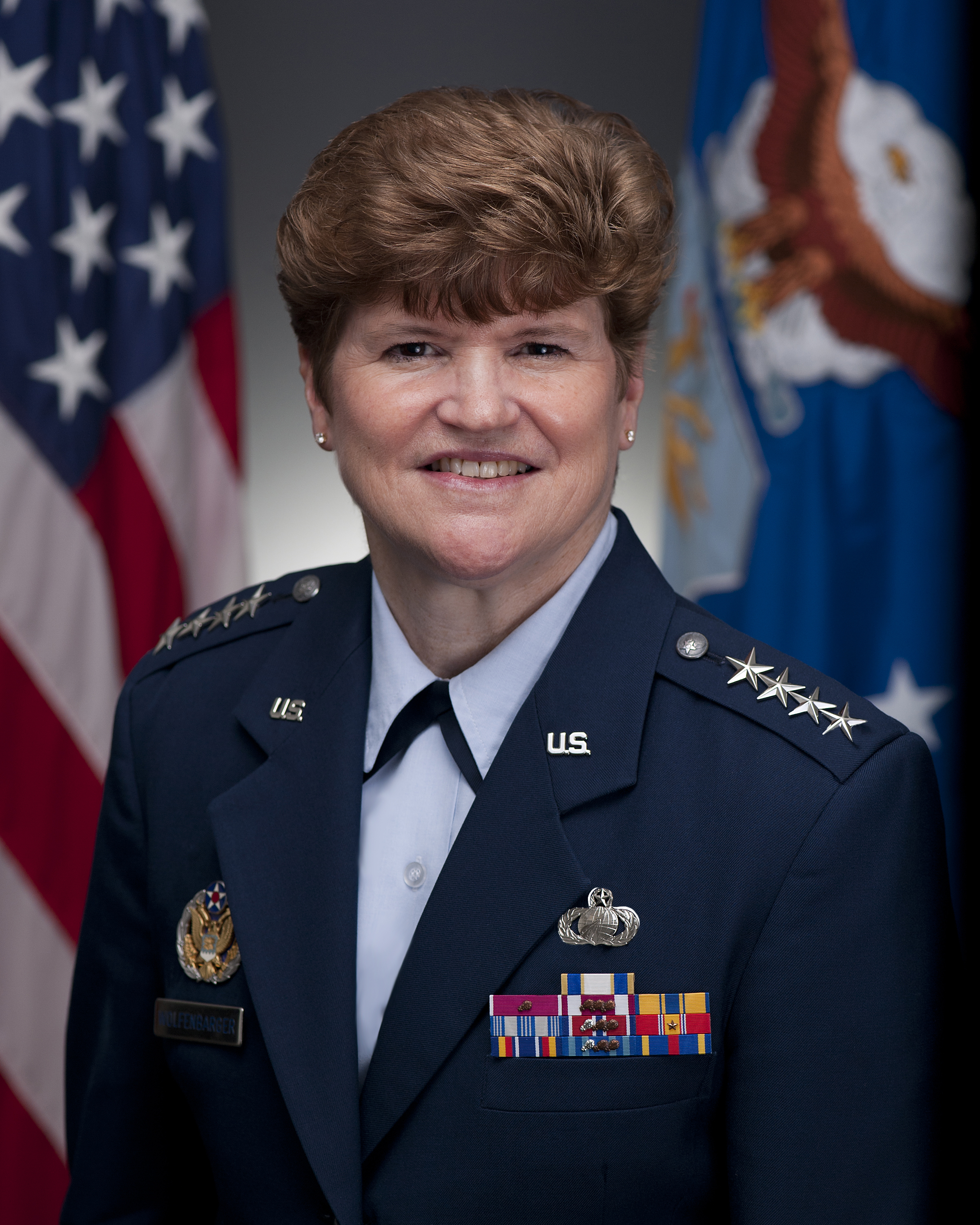
Gen Janet C. Wolfenbarger, USAF

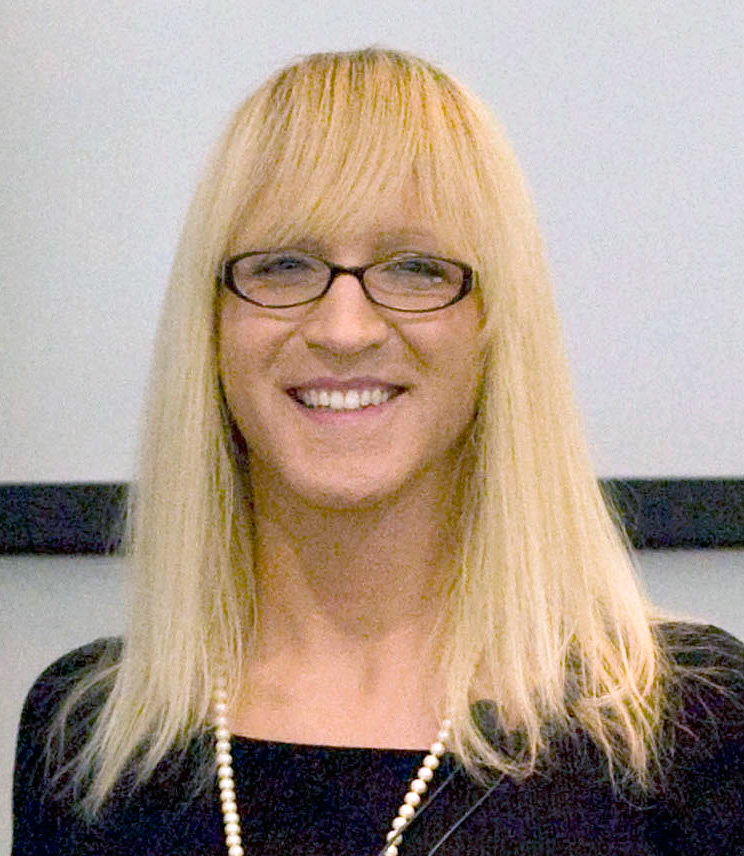
CPT Allyson Robinson, United States Army (Ret.)

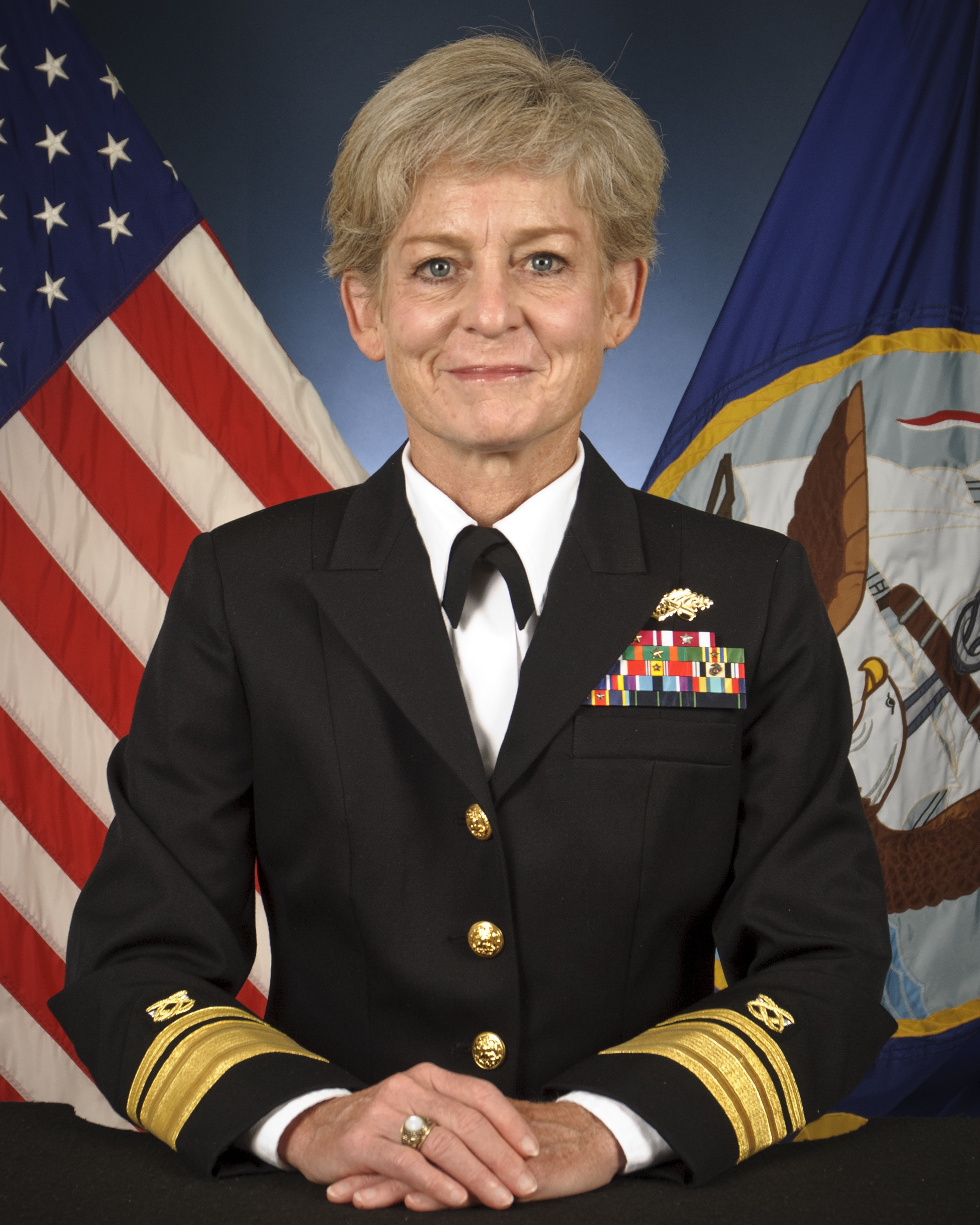
RADM Katherine L. Gregory, USN

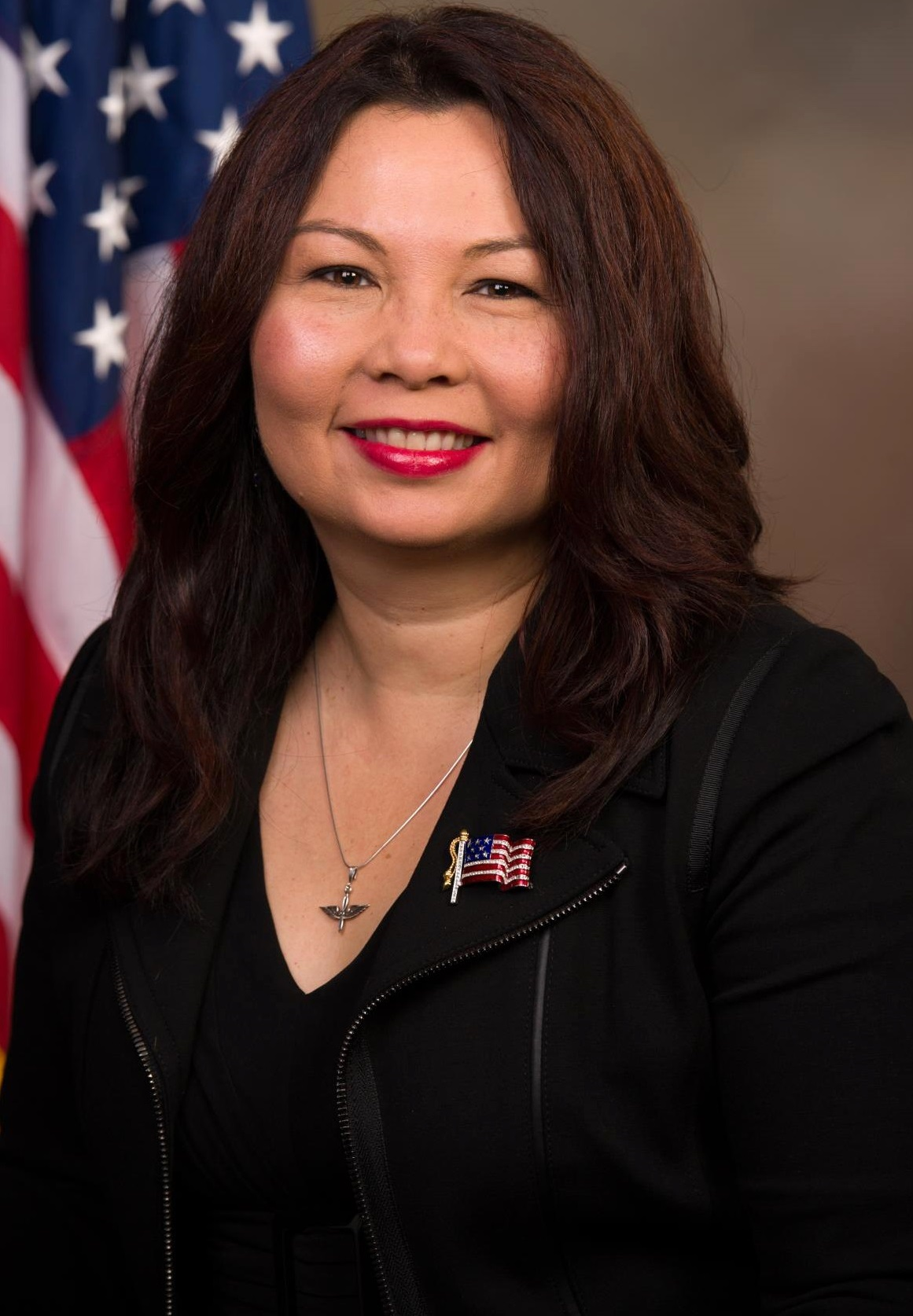
MAJ Tammy Duckworth, United States Army

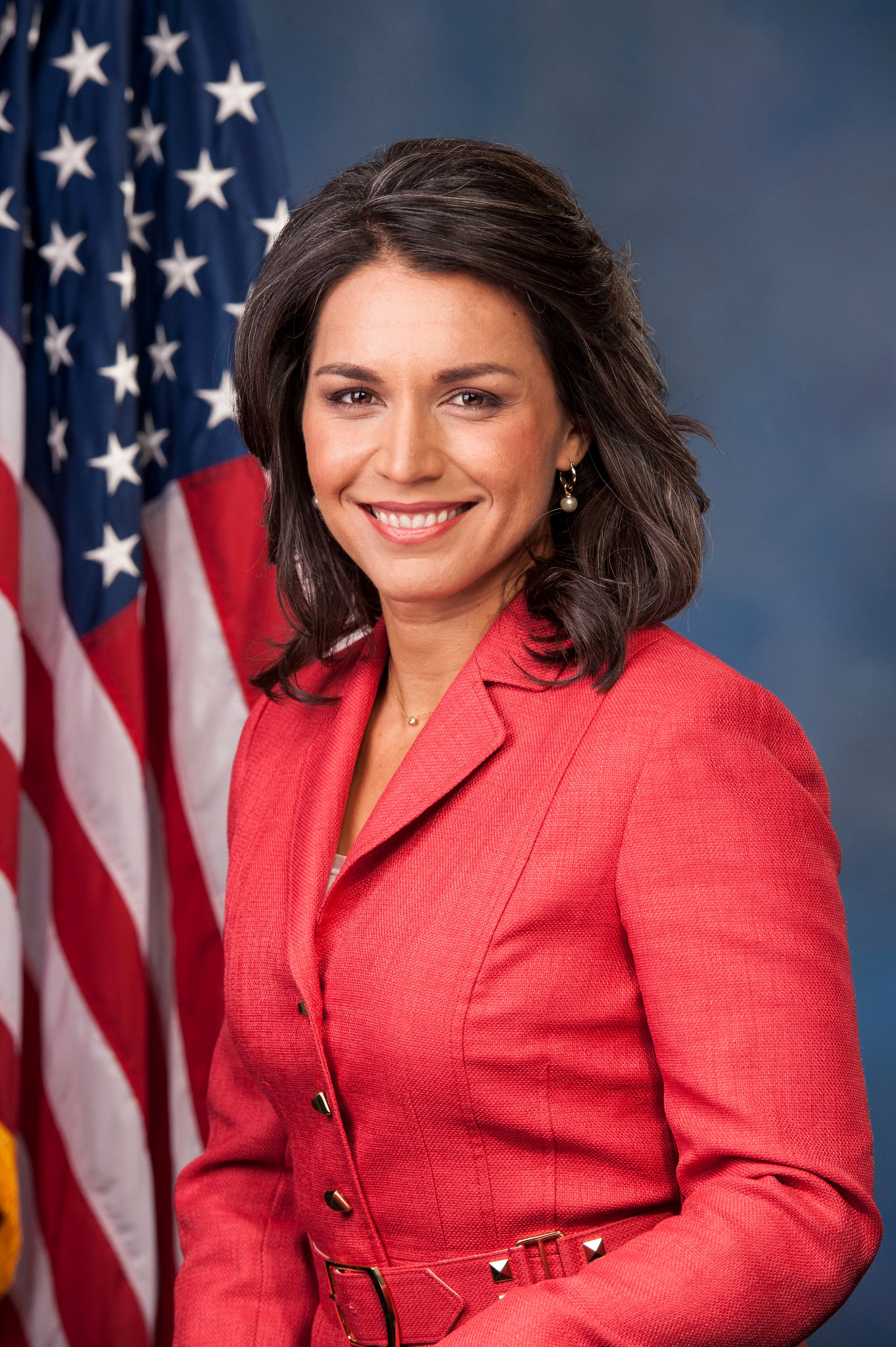
Major Tulsi Gabbard, Army National Guard

BG Tammy Smith, United States Army (right) and her wife Tracey Hepner.

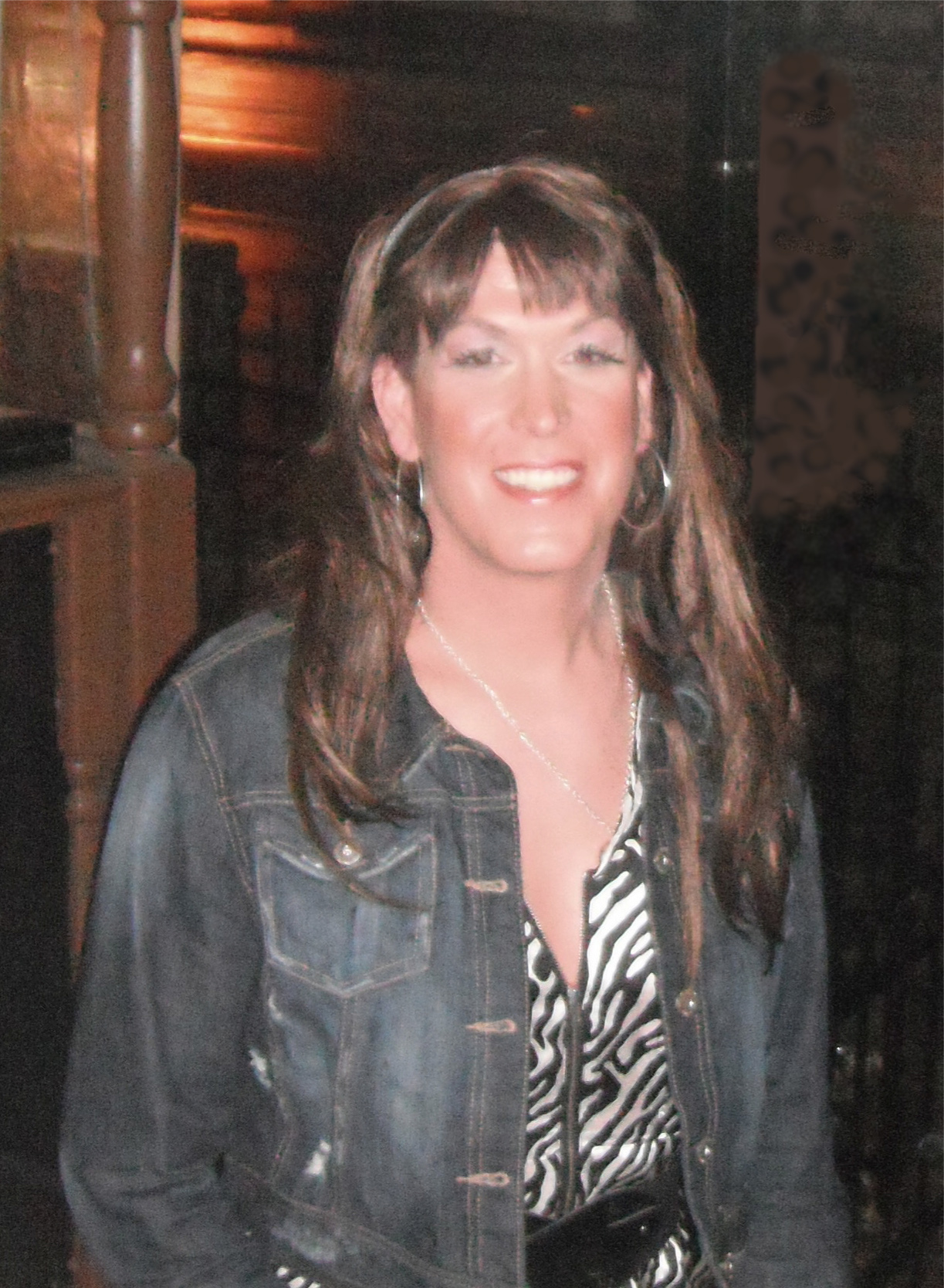
SCPO Kristin Beck, USN (Ret.)

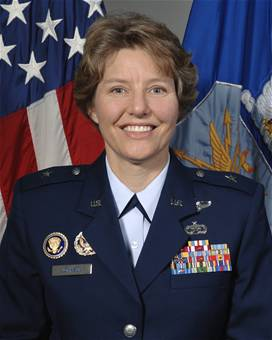
Lt Gen Michelle D. Johnson, USAF

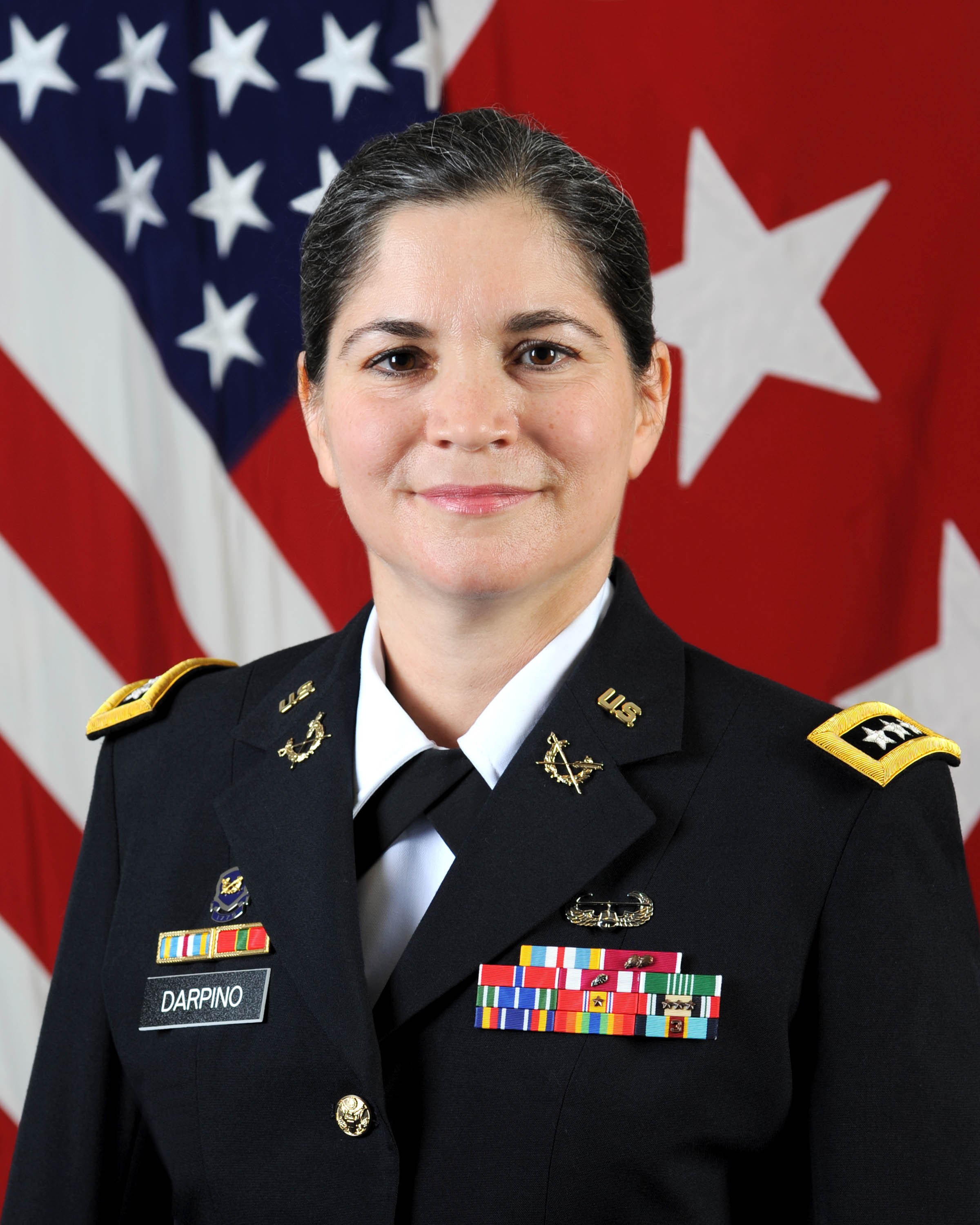
LTG Flora D. Darpino, United States Army

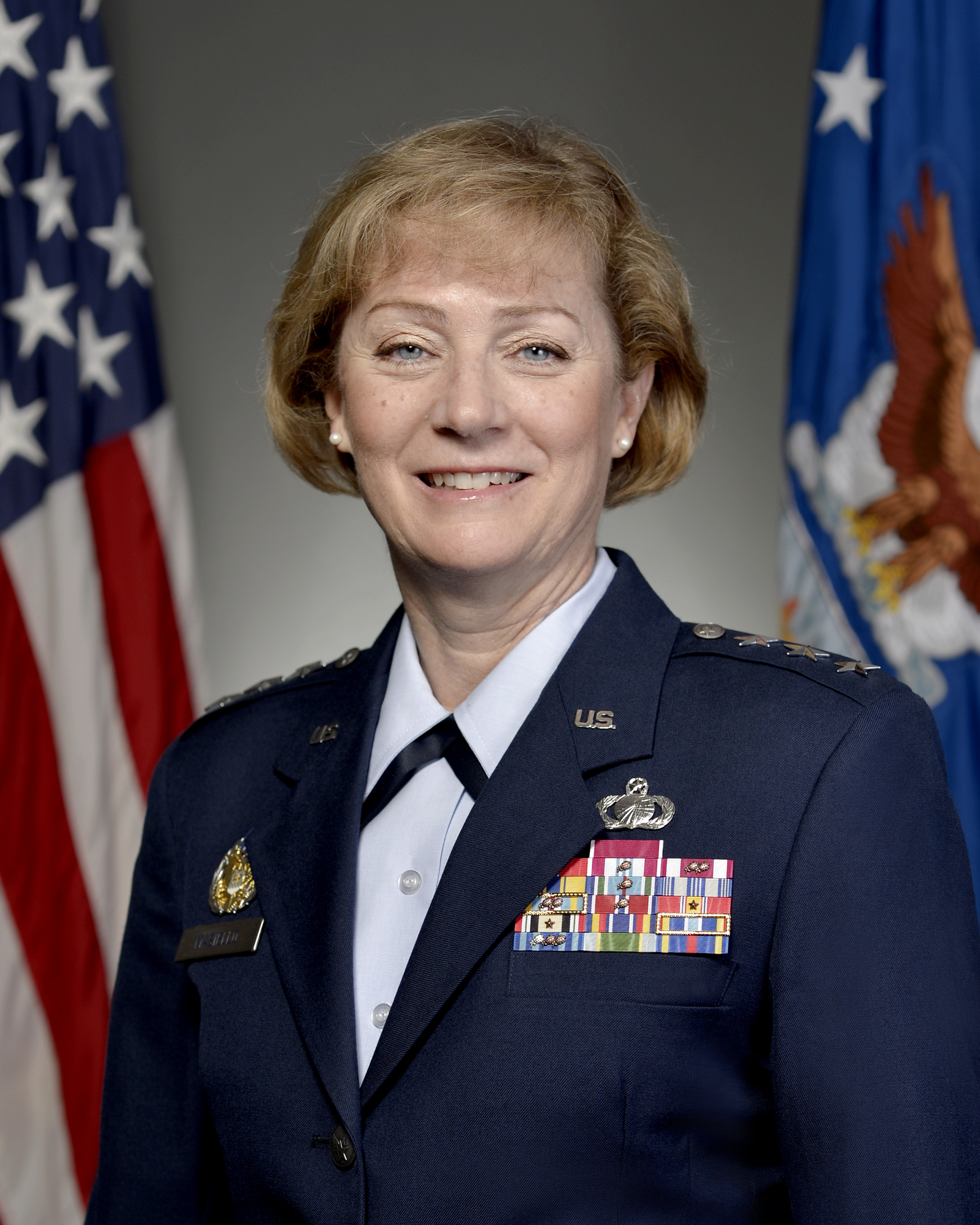
Lt Gen Wendy M. Masiello, USAF

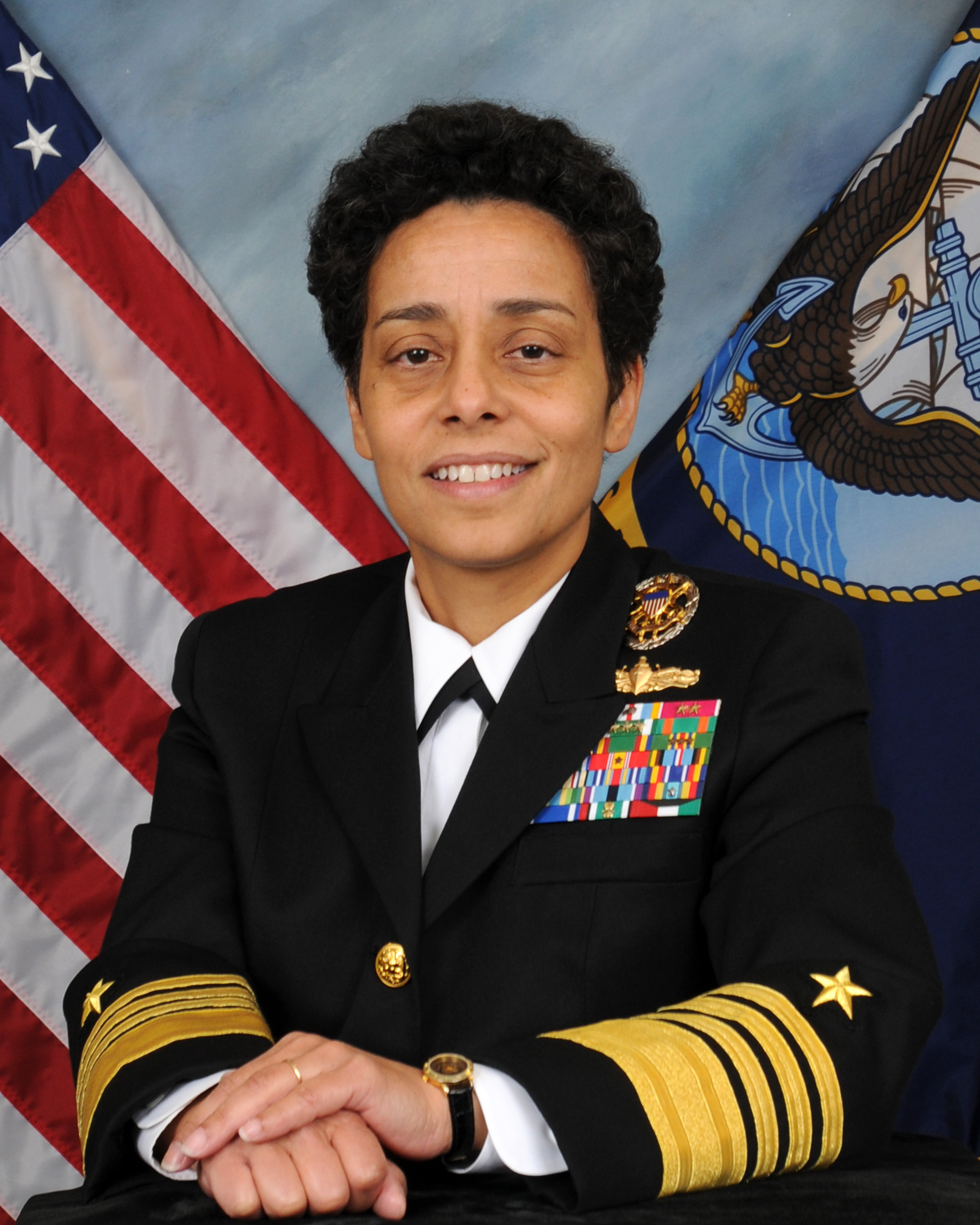
ADM Michelle J. Howard, USN

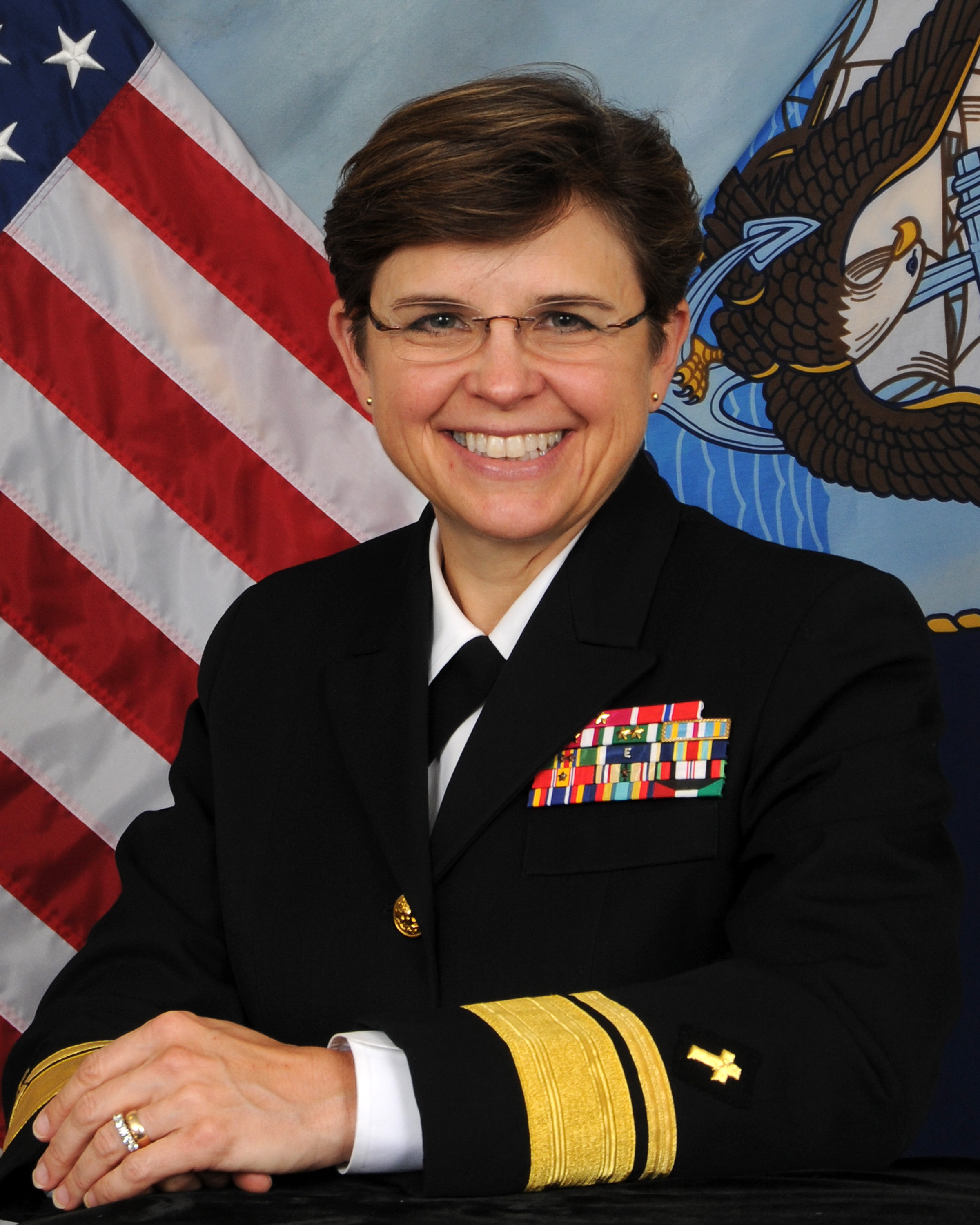
Chaplain RADM Margaret G. Kibben, USN

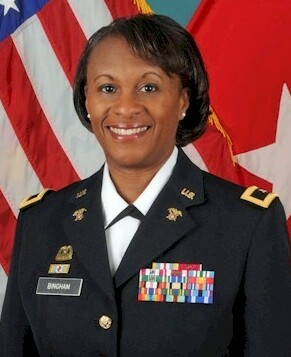
MG Gwen Bingham, United States Army

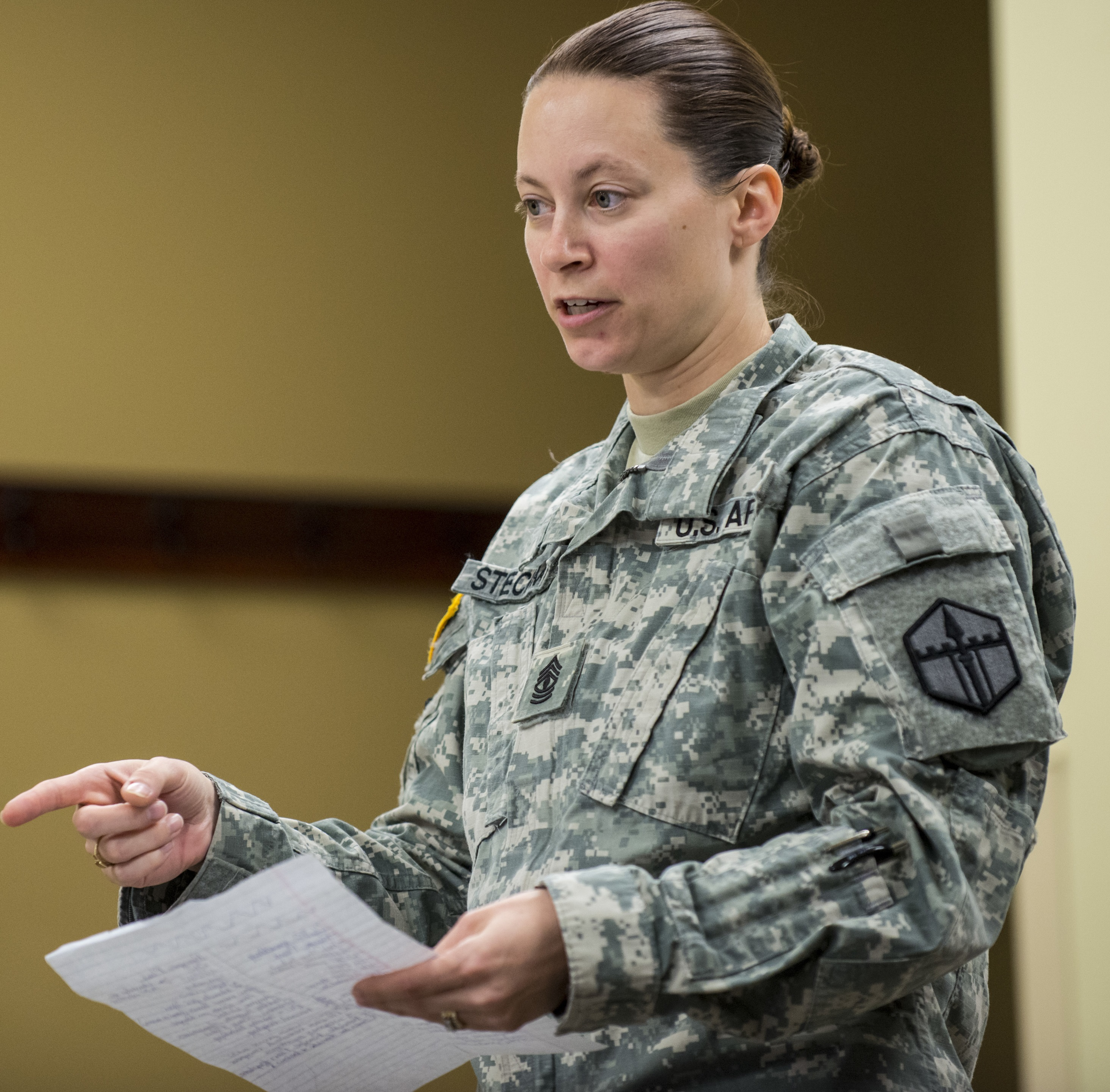
1SG Raquel DiDomenico United States Army

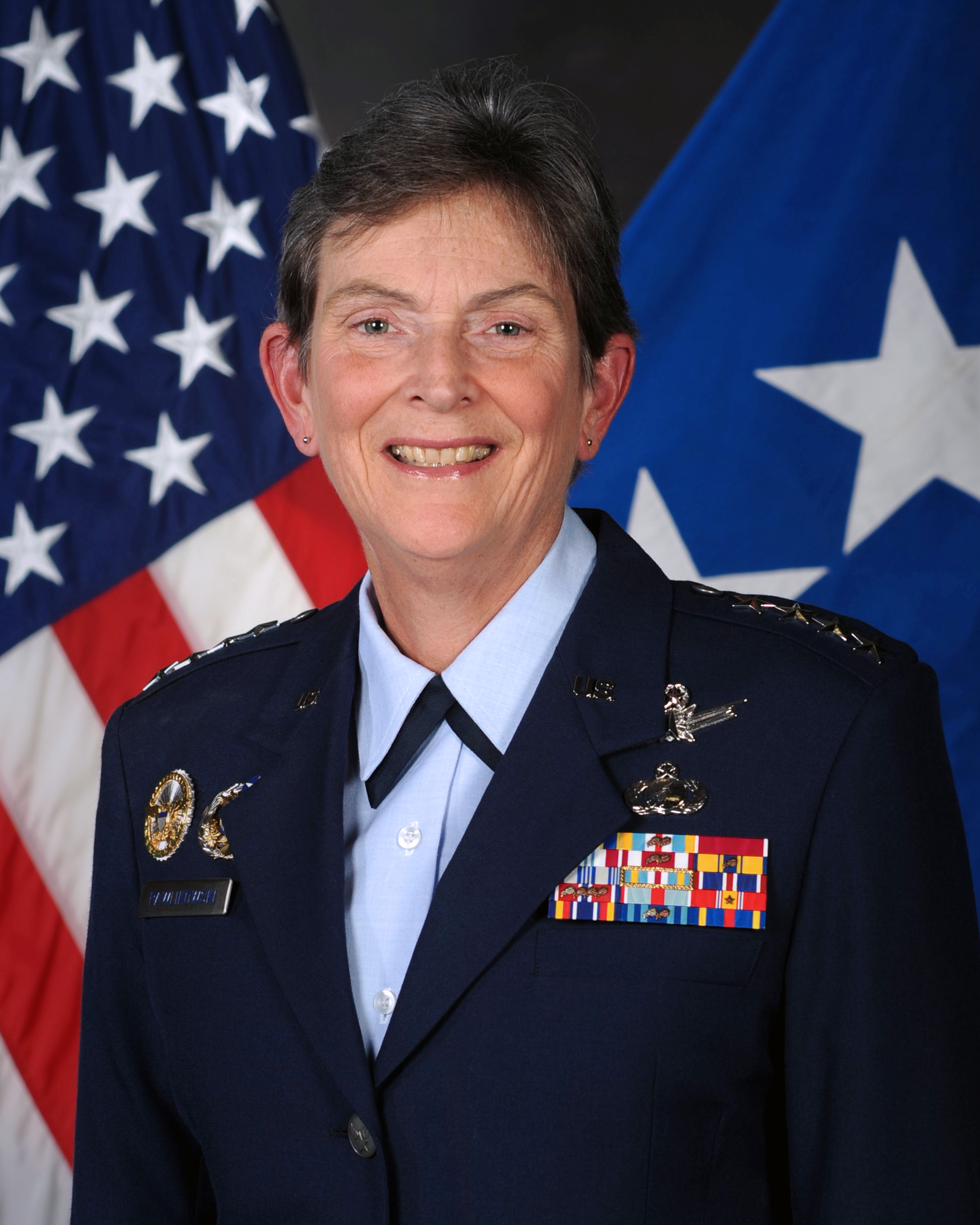
Gen Ellen M. Pawlikowski, USAF

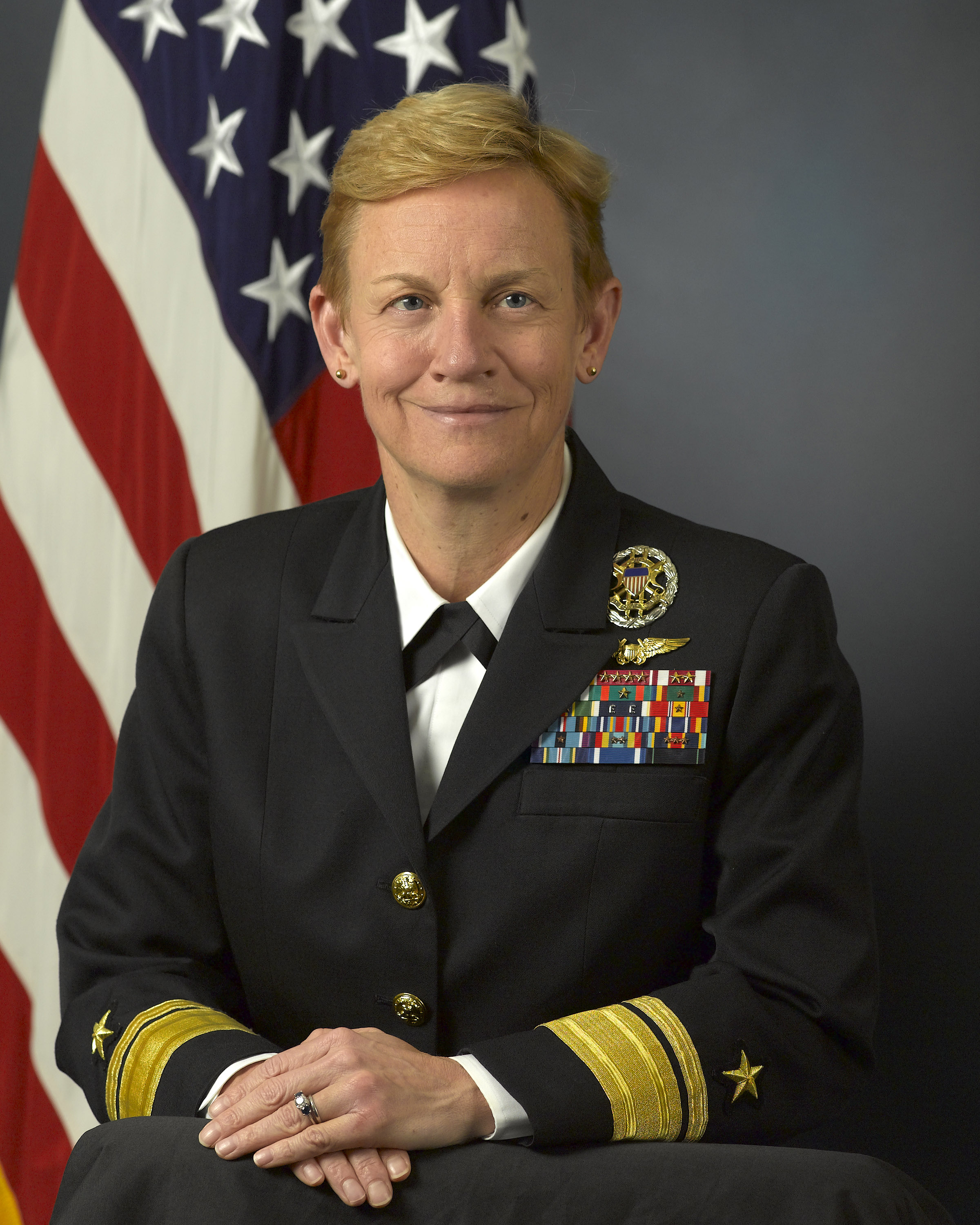
VADM Nora W. Tyson, USN

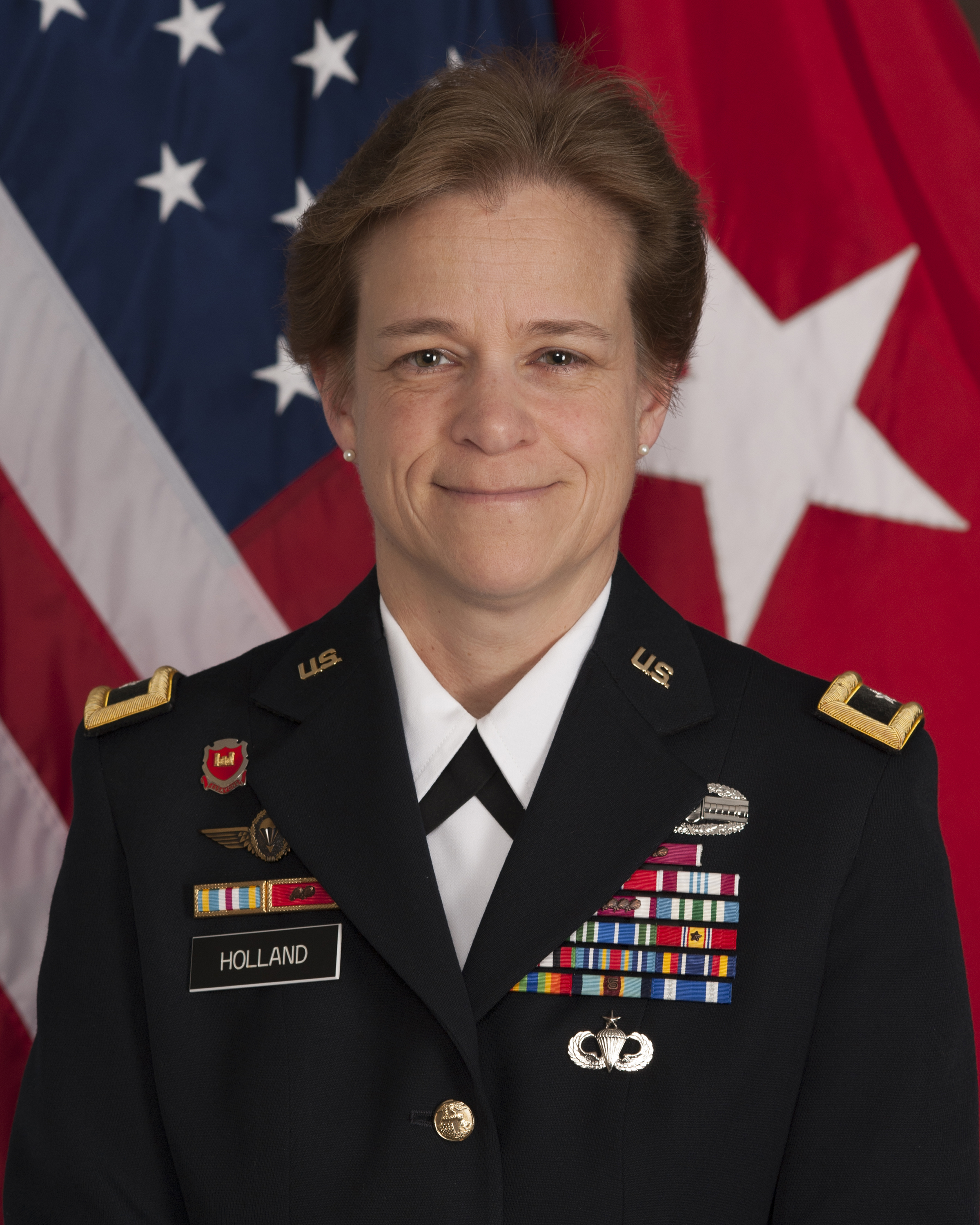
BG Diana M. Holland, United States Army

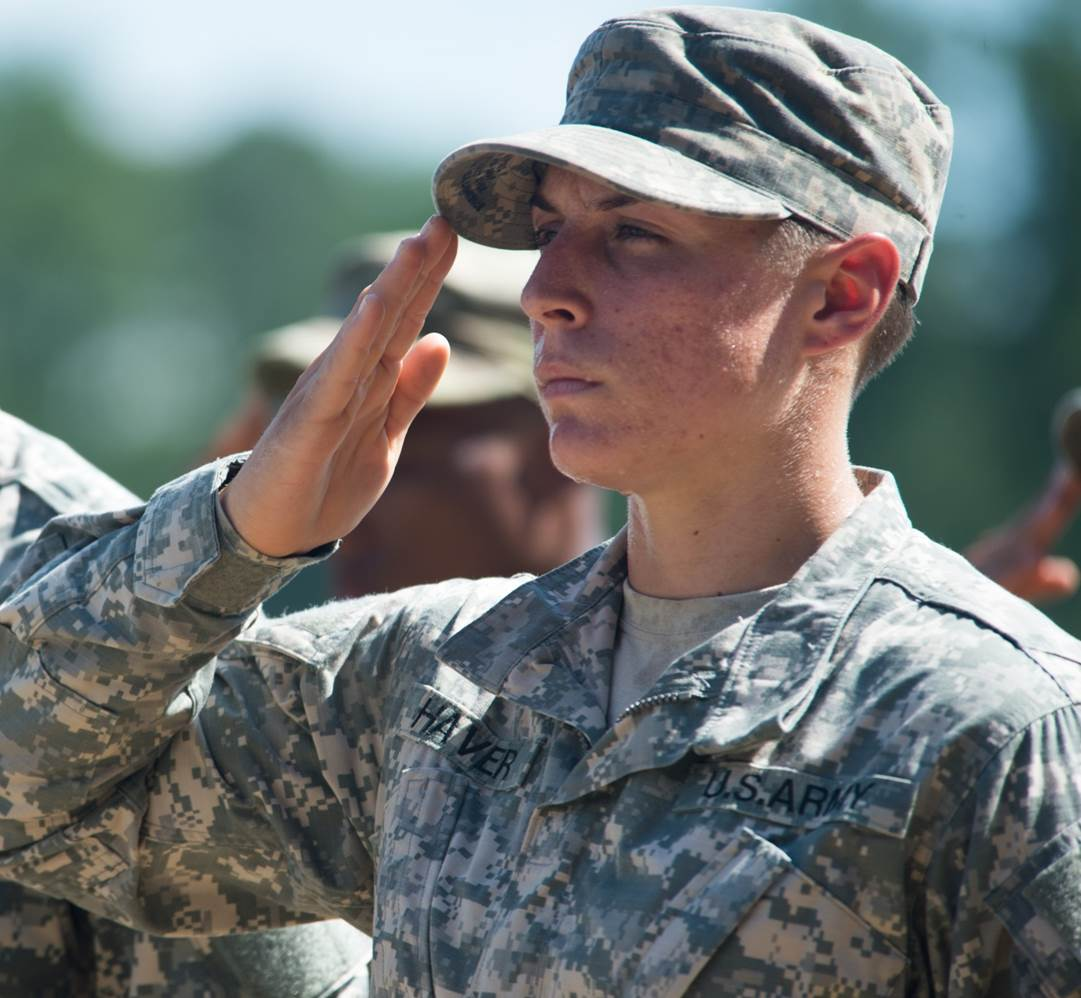
1st Lt. Shaye Lynne Haver, United States Army

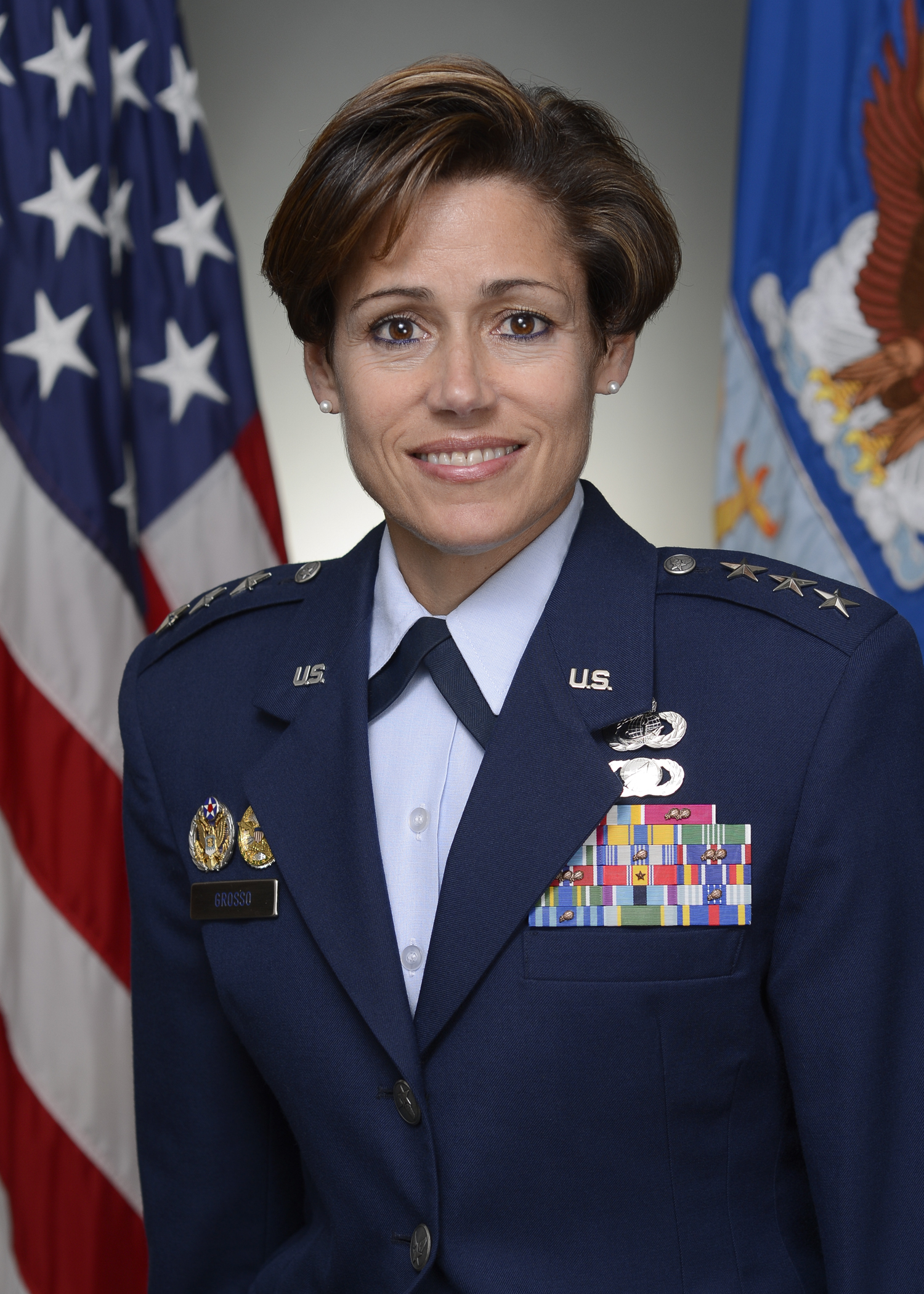
Lieutenant General Gina Grosso, USAF

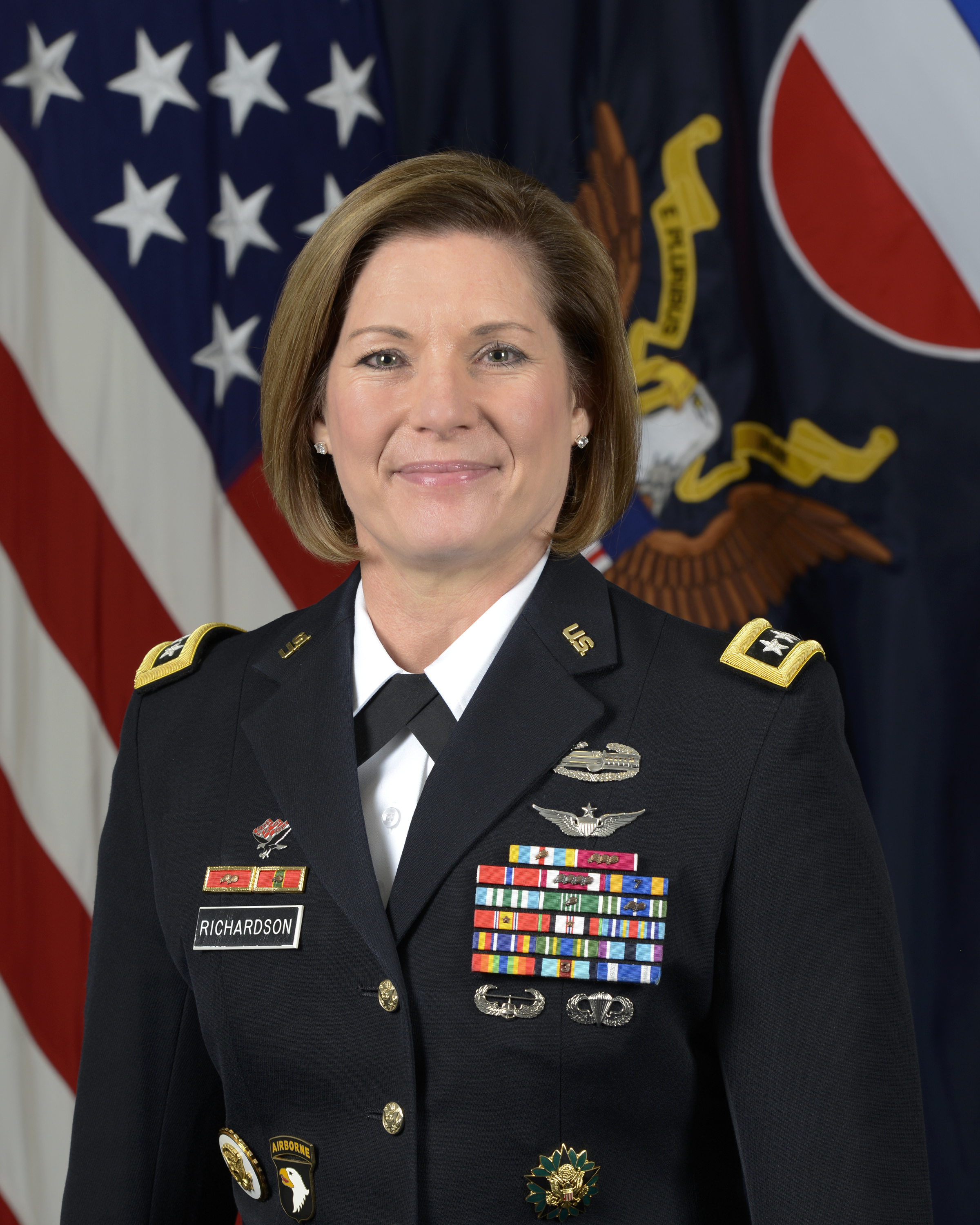
Lt. Gen. Laura J. Richardson United States Army

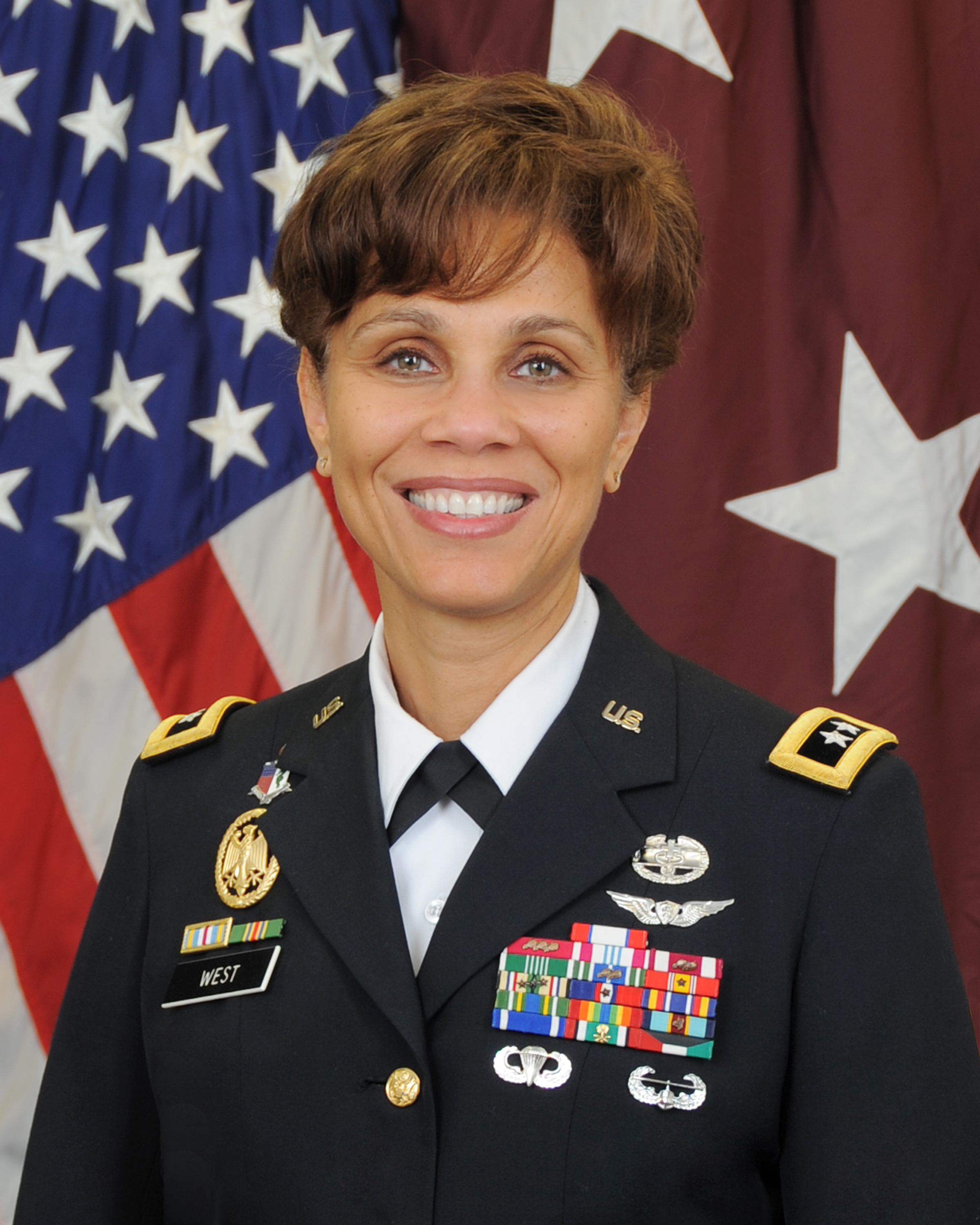
LTG Nadja West, United States Army

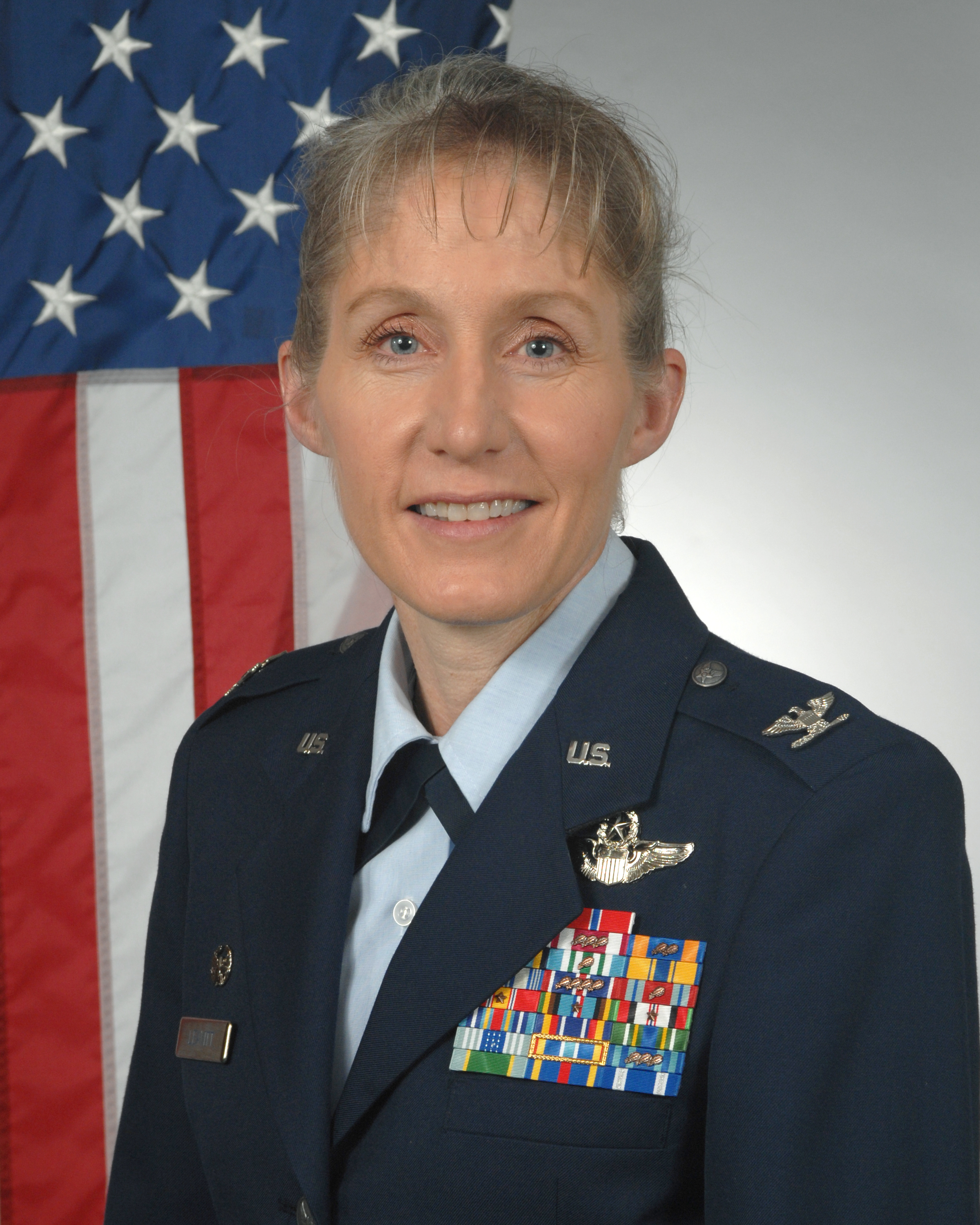
Col. Jeannie Leavitt, USAF

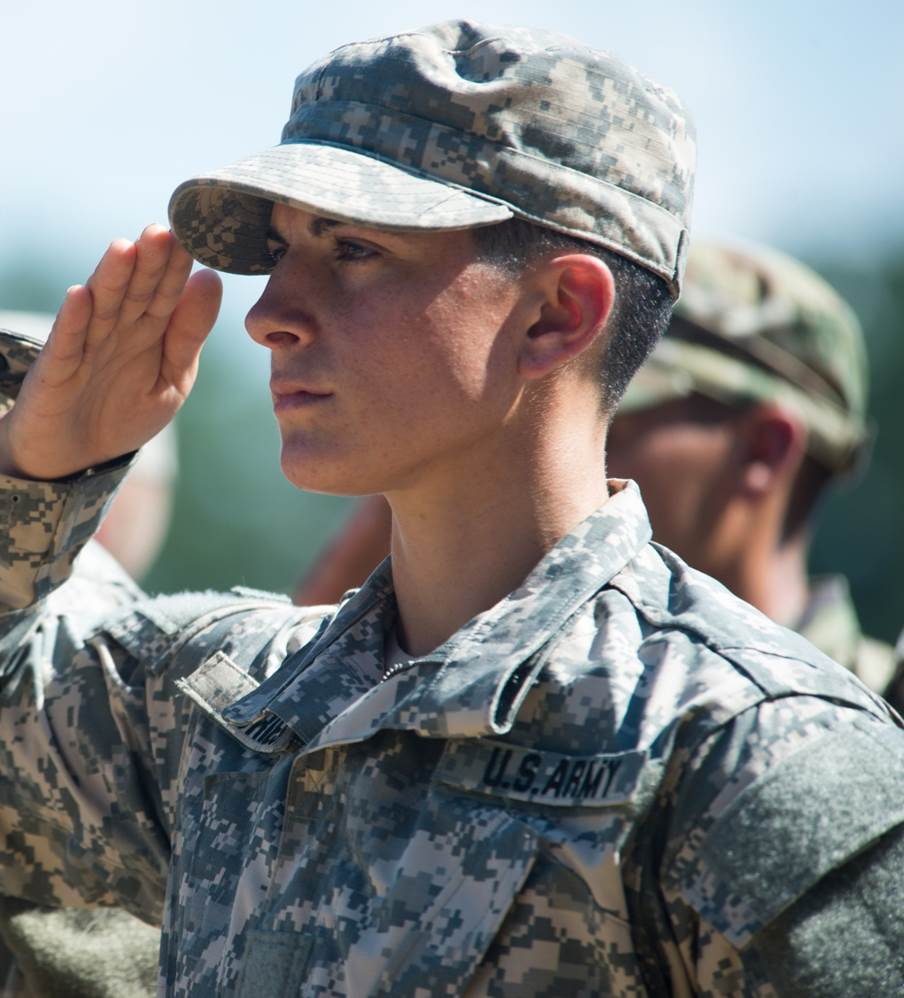
Captain Kristen Marie Griest, United States Army

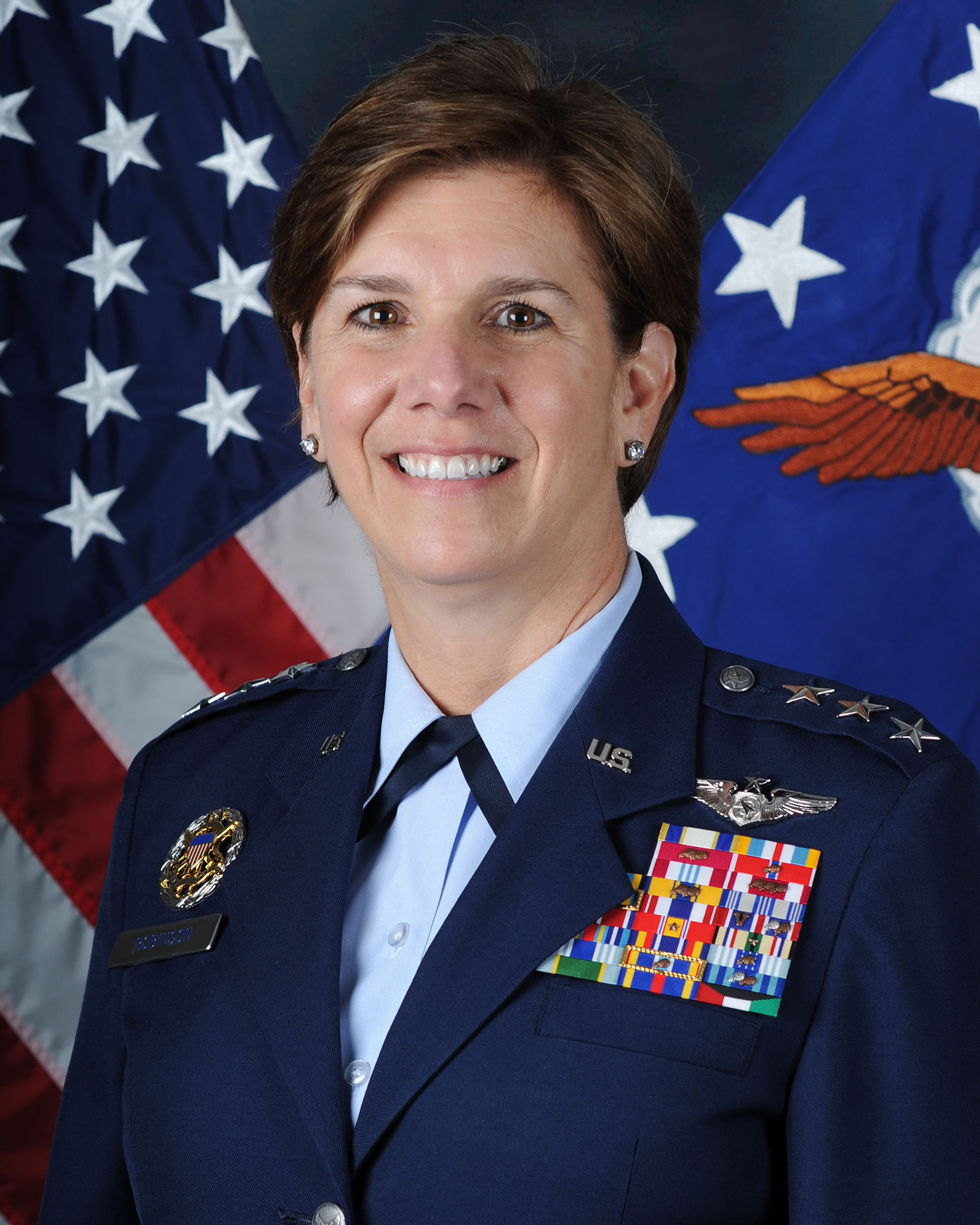
Lt Gen Lori Robinson, USAF

== 2011 ==
- 1 March: Kristin Werner became the first female Chief Gunner's Mate in the Coast Guard.
- March: Air Force Major General Margaret Woodward, 51, became the first American woman to lead a combat air campaign. She directed the airstrikes over Libya for 11 days, until NATO took over.
- 3 June: RADM Sandra Stosz assumed command of the Coast Guard Academy, becoming the first woman superintendent of that institution, and the first woman to command any U.S. service academy.
- 4 June: Heidi Shyu became United States Assistant Secretary of the Army for Acquisition, Logistics, and Technology.
- 17 June: BGen Loretta Reynolds, USMC became the first female commander at Parris Island. Furthermore, while serving a yearlong tour of duty with the group at Camp Leatherneck Afghanistan, Reynolds became the "first female Marine to command battle space", according to the website for the 1st Marine Expeditionary Force. She was the first woman in the Marine Corps to command units in a war zone.
- June: RDML Gretchen S. Herbert, USN, assumed command of Navy Cyber Forces at Joint Expeditionary Base Little Creek-Fort Story, Virginia Beach, Virginia.
- 29 September: Marcia M. Anderson became the first African-American woman to achieve the rank of major general in the United States Army Reserve.
- On 16 December 2011, 24-year-old Justine Sacco became the first woman to assume command of Delta FSC, 26th Brigade Support Battalion, forward support company of 1st Squadron, 33rd Cavalry 3rd Brigade Combat Team at Fort Campbell, Kentucky.
- President Barack Obama named Brenda Sue Fulton to the Board of Visitors of the U.S. Military Academy at West Point, making her the first openly gay or lesbian person to serve there. She is the executive director and co-founder of Knights Out, an organization of LGBT West Point graduates and their supporters, and a founding member of OutServe.
- The first all-female U.S. Air Force combat mission is flown by Maj. Christine Mau, Maj. Tracy Schmidt, Capt. Leigh Larkin, and Capt. Jennifer Morton, called the "Strike Eagles of 'Dudette 07'." They fly two F-15E jets in a sortie over Afghanistan.
- Capt. Donna Cottrell became the first female commanding officer of the U.S. Coast Guard's one-of-a-kind tactical drug interdiction helicopter squadron.
- For the first time, four sisters from the same family (the Robillards) graduated from the U.S. Air Force Academy.
- Julie Bentz became the first female brigadier general in the American National Guard.
- Jessica Ray became the first female Avenger master gunner in the U.S. army.
- Lt. Gen. Patricia Horoho became the first female U.S. Army surgeon general.
- The U.S. National Guard began using female engagement teams in 2011.
- A group of women from Port Hueneme became the first all-female team in Seabees history to take on and complete a construction project.
- The USS Constitution announces the selection of Senior Chief Aviation Maintenance Administrationman (AW/SW) Roxanne Rhoades, making her the first woman to serve as the Command Senior Chief onboard Old Ironsides.
- Margaret W. Burcham became the first woman to command a U.S. Corps of Engineers division when she took command of the Great Lakes and Ohio River Division located in Cincinnati, OH. The division consists of seven engineer districts that include over 4800 personnel operating in a 17 state region with the responsibility for the federal water resource development throughout the Great Lakes and Ohio River basins.
- The first group of U.S. female submariners completed nuclear power school and officially reported on board two ballistic and two guided missile submarines in November 2011.
- Pratima Dharm, born in India, became the U.S. Army's first Hindu chaplain, as well as the first female chaplain of Indian descent in the U.S. Army.
- Petty Officer 2nd Class Marissa Gaeta and Petty Officer 3rd Class Citlalic Snell became the first gay couple to share the US Navy tradition of the "first kiss" on the pier.
- Brenda Sue Fulton was named to the West Point Board of Visitors, making her the first openly gay member of the board that advises the academy.

== 2012 ==
- On 29 May, the very first U.S. Air Force Medical Service Senior Non-Commissioned Officer Leadership Award ever given was presented to Senior Master Sgt. Lorraine A. Hieskill, superintendent of the 59th Surgical Inpatient Squadron, at the San Antonio Military Medical Center, Ft. Sam Houston, Texas.
- 22 June: A sailor assigned to USS Ohio (SSGN 726) became the first female supply officer to qualify in U.S. submarines.
- July: Major General Sharon K.G. Dunbar, USAF, is the first female selected to serve in the dual positions of Commander of the Air Force District of Washington and Commander of the 320th Air Expeditionary Wing, Joint Base Andrews, Md.
- 20 July: VADM Nanette M. DeRenzi became the Judge Advocate General of the Navy.
- 13 August: VADM Robin Braun, USN began serving as Chief of Navy Reserve and Commander, Navy Reserve Force. She is the first female commander of the U.S. Navy Reserve, and the first woman to lead any Reserve component of the U.S. military.
- 5 September: Pvt Stephanie Kasten enlisted as the first female in South Dakota in a combat MOS as a 13M crew member.
- Air Force Col. Ginger Wallace became the first known out member of the U.S. military to have their same-sex partner participate in the pinning ceremony tradition that had been reserved for spouses and family members. Her partner of 10 years, Kathy Knopf, pinned colonel wings on Wallace days after the two attended President Obama's State of The Union address as a guest of the First Lady.
- Navy Chief Elny McKinney and Anacelly McKinney became the first known same-sex couple to marry on a U.S. military base. They were wed at Naval Base Point Loma in San Diego.
- The 50,000th graduate of the U.S. Navy's Naval Nuclear Power Training Unit in New York was a woman, MM3 Jenna Swindt, who completed her training in March.
- The U.S. Coast Guard hosted its first women's athletics leadership conference.
- The Pentagon announced that it would allow women in the U.S. military to serve in noninfantry battalion jobs, such as radio operators, intelligence analysts, medics, radar operators, and tank mechanics, beginning in summer 2012. It began on 14 May. Cicely Verstein became the first woman in America to qualify for an Army combat-arms support job.
- Col. Dawne Deskins became the first female commander of the U.S. military's Eastern Air Defense Sector in Rome, New York.
- Margaret W. Burcham became the first woman to be promoted to general officer in the U.S. Army Corps of Engineers.
- Five "Tigertails" of Carrier Airborne Early Warning Squadron One Two Five (VAW-125), embarked aboard the Nimitz-class aircraft carrier USS Carl Vinson (CVN-70) as part of Carrier Air Wing Seventeen (CVW-17), flew an historic flight on 25 January when they participated in the U.S. Navy's first all-female E-2C Hawkeye combat mission.
- Commander Monika Washington Stoker, United States Navy, became the first African American woman to take command of a U.S. Navy missile destroyer.
- Brig. Gen. Laura Richardson became the U.S. Army's first female to serve as a division deputy commander.
- Janet Wolfenbarger became the U.S. Air Force's first female four-star general.
- The U.S. Marine Corps opened its Infantry Officers Course in Quantico, Va. to women for the first time in its history. Two women joined; one dropped out on 28 September after not completing the introductory endurance test. The other passed that test but was dropped later because of unspecified medical reasons.
- Col. Jeannie Leavitt became the first woman to take command of a U.S. Air Force combat fighter wing.
- Gwendolyn Bingham was named the first female White Sands Missile Range commander in the U.S. military.
- The U.S. Air Force has now identified at least 31 women as victims in a growing rape scandal, a four-star general announced.
- U.S. Secretary of Defense Leon Panetta changed the policy that the unit commander would decide whether to move ahead with the investigation and prosecution of reported sexual assaults, a policy accused of placing the decision in the hands of commanders who work with, and are often close friends of, the accused. Under the new policy announced by Panetta, the decision rests higher up the chain of command, at the level of colonel (or, in the Navy, captain).
- Lt. Britta Christianson became the first female supply officer to qualify in submarines in the United States.
- Michelle Howard of the U.S. Navy became the first black woman to earn a three-star-rank in the U.S. armed forces.
- Capt. Delana Small became the first female chaplain in a U.S. combat arms unit. She joined the 101st Airborne Division, also known as the "Screaming Eagles."
- Col. Giselle Wilz became the first woman in the North Dakota National Guard to achieve the rank of "full bird" colonel.
- Karla Marie MacArthur became the first female judge advocate in the South Dakota Army National Guard.
- Kathryn Neff became the first female Marine to graduate from the [American] Sapper School and the first interservice graduate to win the Sapper Spirit Award.
- Jennifer Walter became the first female brigadier general in the Iowa Air National Guard.
- The first Riverine Combat Skills Course (RCS) class in the United States to include women graduated in 2012. The women were: Chief Engineman Patricia Cooper, Master-at-Arms 2nd Class Brittney Hellwig, Master-at-Arms Seaman Brianna Tran, and Master-at-Arms Seaman Angela Evans.
- The first same-sex marriage at the U.S. Military Academy was held for a lieutenant and her partner (Ellen Schick and Shannon Simpson) at the Old Cadet Chapel in West Point's cemetery.
- The first same-sex marriage at the U.S. Military Academy's Cadet Chapel at West Point (not to be confused with the Old Cadet Chapel) was held for Brenda Sue Fulton and Penelope Dara Gnesin. Fulton was a veteran and the communications director of an organization called Outserve, which represents actively serving gay, lesbian, bisexual and transgender military personnel.
- The U.S. Air Force launched an initiative to rid its ranks of material seen to objectify women. Pictures and calendars featuring half-naked women were removed from Air Force work spaces and public areas in an attempt to combat sexism and rape culture.
- Three Sailors assigned to USS Maine (SSBN 741) and USS Wyoming (SSBN 742) became the first female unrestricted line officers to qualify in U.S. submarines 5 Dec. Lt. j.g. Marquette Leveque, a native of Fort Collins, Colo., assigned to the Gold Crew of Wyoming, and Lt. j.g. Amber Cowan and Lt. j.g. Jennifer Noonan of Maine's Blue Crew received their submarine "dolphins" during separate ceremonies at Naval Submarine Base Kings Bay, Ga., and Naval Base Kitsap-Bangor, Wash.
- CWO2 Kilohana Akim became the first female Pacific Islander of Hawaiian descent to make INV3 in the U.S. Coast Guard when she was promoted on 1 June 2012.
- Sonja Dyer became the first female maneuver Brigade S-3 in the U.S. Army.
- Ens. Kimberlee D. Hazle was commissioned as the U.S. Navy's first female Aircraft Launch and Recovery Equipment (ALRE) Boatswain (Bos'n).
- Chief Warrant Officer Laura E. Freeman became the first female Material Maintenance Specialty (MAT) warrant officer in the U.S. Coast Guard when she was commissioned MAT2 on 1 June 2012.
- Trans woman Allyson Robinson (who served on active duty as a man) became the first executive director of OutServe-SLDN, following the merger of OutServe and Servicemembers Legal Defense Network in October 2012. This makes her the first transgender person to ever lead a national LGBT rights organization that does not have an explicit transgender focus. OutServe-SLDN is a network of actively serving LGBT military personnel, which launched publicly on 26 July 2010 as OutServe, and is one of the largest LGBT employee resource groups in the world.
- Cameron Fitzsimmons became the first woman to assume duties as the 2nd Low Altitude Air Defense's Headquarters and Service Battery commander in the U.S. Marines.
- Katherine L. Gregory took command of all of NAVAC Naval Facilities Engineering Command as the highest ranked civil engineer in the Navy.
- Jeremy Hilton, whose wife was in the Air Force, became the first man to win the Military Spouse of the Year award from Military Spouse magazine; the award has existed since 2008.
- In 2012, the Marine Corps created a battery of six combat proxy tests in an attempt to answer the question "Are Females Ready for the Fight?" according to results presented at the 3rd International Congress on Soldiers' Physical Performance, which was hosted in Boston in August 2014 by the United States Army Research Institute of Environmental Medicine. For these tests, about 400 male Marines and almost the same number of female Marines were tested on pull-ups, two weight-lifting exercises, a 120-mm tank loading drill, a 155-mm artillery round carry and a 7-foot wall-climb while wearing a fighting load of about 30 pounds. Of the 35 Marines deemed best performers, 92 percent were males and 8 percent were females, proving that some women "are physically capable of meeting the demands of closed combat occupations," according to results of the study presented by Karen Kelly, a San Diego-based research physiologist. However, the Marine Corps decided the proxy tests were not an adequate predictor of success in ground combat jobs.
- Mary Gardner became the first Arkansas Air National Guard female Native American colonel.

== 2013 ==
- 1 March: On this date Major General Michelle D. Johnson is chosen to be the next (and first female) superintendent of the United States Air Force Academy. She begins that job on 12 August 2013.
- 31 March: BGen Tammy Smith, United States Army marries her wife Tracey Hepner. She is the first openly gay U.S. flag officer to come out while serving since the repeal of the Don't ask, don't tell policy. She is the highest ranking openly gay service member of the military.
- 2 July: Hilda Clayton became the first combat documentation and production specialist to be killed in Afghanistan.
- November: The first three women graduate from the United States Marine Corps Infantry Training Battalion program. Fifteen had begun the course.
- December: 1st. Lt. Amanda Mathew, USMC, became the first woman to lead a deployed combat arms platoon.
- MAJ Tammy Duckworth, United States Army, and Captain Tulsi Gabbard, Army National Guard became the first female combat veterans to be sworn into Congress.
- Since 2013 American women troops and family members covered under Tricare can receive medical coverage to abort pregnancies resulting from sexual assault. The Defense Authorization Act for 2013 amended a Pentagon regulation to include rape and incest on the list of permissible uses of Defense Department facilities or funds for abortions for military beneficiaries. Only cases when the health of the mother was in danger were acceptable from 1981 until 2013. However, abortions were covered for female service members until 1981, when Congress passed a law barring the use of Defense Department funds in cases other than those when the mother's life was endangered.
- Sara Joyner became the first woman to command a carrier air wing in the U.S. Navy. She took command of Carrier Air Wing 3, nicknamed "Battle Axe."
- Naval Support Activity Washington promoted the first female to ascend through the ranks from patrol woman to captain at the United States Naval Observatory Naval District Washington Police Station, 10 Jan.
- Cadet Jenna Vercollone became the first female to represent the U.S. Military Academy in any capacity in the sport of hockey. She was a member of the West Point Inline Hockey Club, a hobby club within the Directorate of Cadet Activities.
- Pentagon chief Leon Panetta removed the U.S. military's ban on women serving in combat, overturning a 1994 rule prohibiting women from being assigned to smaller ground combat units. Panetta's decision gave the U.S. military services until January 2016 to seek special exceptions if they believed any positions must remain closed to women. The services had until May 2013 to draw up a plan for opening all units to women and until the end of 2015 to actually implement it. However, in December 2015, Defense Secretary Ash Carter stated that starting in 2016 all combat jobs would open to women.
- In 2013, U.S. Navy Secretary Ray Mabus said that the first women to join Virginia-class attack subs had been chosen: They were newly commissioned female officers scheduled to report to their subs in fiscal year 2015.
- Amanda Mathew became the first woman to lead a deployed combat arms platoon in the U.S. Marines.
- The South Dakota Army National Guard appointed Susan Shoe to the highest ranking senior-enlisted position in the state during a change of responsibility ceremony Saturday, 2 Feb., at the Joint Force Headquarters building on Camp Rapid. She is the first woman to serve in this position in South Dakota.
- Maj. Gen. Megan P. Tatu became commander of the 79th Sustainment Support Command, the largest U.S. Army Reserve Command on the west coast. She is the first female general to do so.
- For the first time the U.S. Department of Veterans Affairs decided to allow the same-sex spouse of a military veteran to be buried in a U.S. national cemetery. VA Secretary Eric Shinseki gave permission for retired Air Force officer Linda Campbell, 66, to bury the ashes of her same-sex spouse Nancy Lynchild at Willamette National Cemetery in Oregon.
- Tech. Sgt. Leslie Cummings, the first female military training instructor in the U.S. Air National Guard, became the first U.S. Air National Guard member to be named the Air University Noncommissioned Officer of the Year. This also makes her the first female military training instructor named the Air University Noncommissioned Officer of the Year.
- Valley Forge Military Academy and College named its first female president, Stacey R. Sauchuk. Sauchuk thus became the first female president at a private military academy and college in the United States.
- The U.S. Veterans Affairs Department launched a new hotline—1-855-VA-WOMEN—for questions from veterans, their families and caregivers about VA services and resources available to women veterans.
- Marlene Rodriguez became the first woman to join Chapter 49 of the Military Order of the Purple Heart. Chapter 49 is the largest chapter in California with about 325 members.
- Nadja Y. West became the first African-American female two-star general in the U.S. Army Medical Department.
- Autumn Sandeen, a U.S. veteran and transgender woman, received a letter from a Navy official stating, "Per your request the Defense Enrollment Eligibility Reporting System (DEERS) has been updated to show your gender as female effective 12 April 2013." Allyson Robinson of Outserve-SLDN declared, "To our knowledge, this is the first time that the Department of Defense has recognized and affirmed a change of gender for anyone affiliated, in a uniformed capacity — in this case a military retiree."
- The first class of U.S. women soldiers joined A Battery, 1st Battalion, 78th Field Artillery, to learn the 13M, Multiple Launch Rocket System Crewmember military occupational specialty—an MOS that was previously closed to women.
- Tania Calderon-Griek became the first woman to earn her way into the final round of the U.S. 82nd Airborne Division's All American Week combatives tournament.
- The first female combat soldier statue in America was unveiled at the Coleman Veterans Memorial in Michigan on Memorial Day.
- Lisa M. Franchetti was appointed as the first female commander for U.S. Naval Forces Korea.
- Karen Voorhees became the first woman to advance to chief petty officer in the rate of aviation survival technician in the U.S. Coast Guard since women were integrated into U.S. Coast Guard active duty service in 1973.
- RDML June Ryan became the first prior-enlisted woman in the Coast Guard to be promoted to flag rank when she was promoted to RDML.
- CDR Lexia Littlejohn became the first African-American female Coast Guard Academy graduate to reach the rank of O-5.
- The first five women graduated from the 14-week U.S. course which prepares soldiers to work on the Bradley Fighting Vehicle during training or while under fire in a war zone.
- Syrian state media said Nicole Mansfield, a single mother from the Midwestern city of Flint, Michigan, was killed with two others in an ambush by Syrian government forces on an opposition mission in northwestern Syria. They said she was with a rebel group, but it was not clear which one.
- Retired Navy Seal Kristin Beck came out as a transgender woman, the first retired Navy Seal to do so.
- Julie A. Bentz became the first woman promoted to major general in the Oregon National Guard.
- Major General Patricia "Trish" Rose became the first openly lesbian two-star general in the U.S. Air Force, and the highest ranking openly gay officer in the entire U.S. military at the time.
- The U.S. Air Force appointed Dr. Mica Endsley as its first female chief scientist.
- Bette Bolivar became the first woman to take command of the U.S. Navy Region Northwest.
- The Texas Veterans of Foreign Wars elected Sylvia Sanchez as their first female commander.
- The U.S. Labor Department began a website focused on women military veterans.
- Sgt. Maj. Angela M. Maness took the reins of the "Oldest Post of the [U.S. Marine] Corps" as the new sergeant major of Marine Barracks Washington. She is the first woman in history to hold this billet at the Barracks.
- Kristin K. French was appointed as the first female commanding general at the Rock Island Arsenal in Illinois.
- Pfc. Jessica Jones and Pfc. Angelika Jansen became the first two women to have graduated as U.S. Army artillery mechanics. Jones and Jansen graduated 16 July as 91P artillery mechanics after 15 weeks of training at Fort Lee.
- Four women became the first women to graduate from the M1 Abrams Tank Systems Maintainer Course at Fort Benning, Georgia, United States.
- The U.S. military announced Spc. Jennie Dushane was the first female soldier in the North Dakota National Guard to earn the Squad Designated Marksman distinction.
- Capt. Amy Burin was installed as the first female commanding officer of SPAWAR Systems Center Atlantic.
- In March a new U.S. Army combat uniform that takes into consideration fit requirements of female soldiers (the Army Combat Uniform-Alternate, known as ACU-A) was approved for use by both men and women. The new uniform is wider in the hips and backside and has elastic around the waistband instead of a draw string, as well as adjusted pockets and elbow-pad and knee-pad inserts and shortened crotch length. The rank and name plate were also repositioned on the uniform jacket. The new uniform also has slimmer shoulders, a longer coat, and buttons that replace the Velcro pockets.
- U.S. Defense Secretary Chuck Hagel said his department would extend a pilot program giving victims of sexual assault their own legal representation and would consider allowing them more influence in the sentencing phase of trials.
- The US Naval Academy announced that it would integrate sexual assault prevention into the academic program in an effort to combat high rates of sexual assault in the military.
- The US soldier born as Bradley Manning, who was sentenced to 35 years in prison for leaking hundreds of thousands of classified documents, announced plans to undergo hormone therapy and asked to be recognized as a woman named Chelsea Manning.
- The U.S. Colonel born as James Pritzker, who has endowed a study on transgender people in the military, announced she identifies as a woman and will now be known as Jennifer Natalya Pritzker.
- Debbie Kash was chosen as the first female commander of the Military Order of World Wars, a national patriotic organization of American military officers of all services and their descendants.
- Flora D. Darpino was sworn in as the first female Judge Advocate General of the United States Army.
- Cpl. Heather Redenius became the first woman to graduate from the U.S. Marines' Assault Climber's Course.
- Master Sgt. Angela Shunk and her wife, Tech. Sgt. Stacey Shunk, became the first same-sex couple to receive an assignment together under the U.S. Air Force's Join Spouse program.
- Cathy Jorgensen became the first female Alaska Army National Guard general.
- Shannon Stout, the medical officer for 2nd Tank Battalion at Camp Lejeune, N.C., became the first female field grade officer within the unit, and possibly within any combat arms battalion in the U.S. Marine Corps.
- U.S. Navy Secretary Ray Mabus announced that the Virginia and the Minnesota, members of the Virginia class of nuclear submarines, would each have three female officers beginning no later than January 2015, making them the first U.S. attack submarines to have women in their crews.
- Brooke Bailey became the first female recruiter to be named Recruiter of the Year in the Indiana Army National Guard.
- Robin Baker became the first female combat engineer to earn the rank of gunnery sergeant in the U.S. Marines.
- Jana L. Harrison became the first woman inducted into the Kansas National Guard Hall of Fame.
- The first full-size statue on a U.S. Army post recognizing the service of Army women was unveiled at Fort Lee in Virginia.
- Rachel L. Fails became the first female senior enlisted leader for the Iowa National Guard.
- Col. Anna Friederich-Maggard became the first female in the Pittsburg State University ROTC Alumni Hall of Fame.
- Three women (Pfc. Julia Carroll, Pfc. Christina Fuentes Montenegro, and Pfc. Katie Gorz) became the first women to graduate from the U.S. Marines' enlisted infantry course, although they were not allowed to join the infantry because it was still closed to women.
- Col. Lynette Arnhart, who suggested fewer photos of attractive (as opposed to average) women be used in promotional material to recruit women for combat duty, agreed to step down as the American military branch's director of gender-integration studies. Col. Christian Kubik, who was the Training and Doctrine Command public affairs officer, was suspended; Kubik forwarded Arnhart's email with her suggestion to other spokespeople at TRADOC. According to Politico, the forwarded message included a comment from Kubik asking the public affairs officials to avoid using photos that "glamorize" women and instead "use 'real' photos that are typical, not exceptional."
- Anika Degraff, Melissa Czarnogursky, and Larissa Schwerin became the first women to serve as fire direction specialists in the field artillery branch of the American army.
- Michelle Howard was confirmed by the Senate as the first female four-star admiral and the first female vice chief of naval operations in the U.S. Navy's history.
- The American President Barack Obama signed into law signed into law H.R. 3304, the "National Defense Authorization Act for Fiscal Year 2014," which among other things declares that military commanders no longer will be permitted to overturn jury convictions for sexual assault.
- Miyako N. Schanely became the first female Japanese-American general in the U.S. Army; this also made her the first female engineer in the U.S. Army Reserve and second in the entire U.S. Army to become a general. As well, she is only the second Japanese-American woman to reach a flag rank in the entire U.S. military, following Air Force Maj. Gen. Susan Mashiko.
- Susan Soto became the first Native American woman to be named the commander of a Veterans of Foreign War post in November 2013 when she took the helm of Southampton Post 7009.
- In October 2013, first Lt. Ashley White and Capt. Jenny Moreno, who had been part of a pioneering all-women team recruited for special operations combat missions and had died on night raids in southern Afghanistan, became the first two women to be honored at the National Infantry Museum's Memorial Walk.

== 2014 ==
- March: The U.S. Marine Corps announced that they had opened 11 more specialties to female Marines.
- June: Lt Gen Wendy M. Masiello became Director of the Defense Contract Management Agency, based in Fort Lee, Virginia.
- 1 July: Michelle Howard began her assignment as the U.S. Navy's first female and first African-American admiral.
- 16 July: Following a petition to the Secretary of the Navy, the U.S. Marine Corps received approval to open the first 11 previously closed combat-related MOSs to women, namely, 0803 Target acquisition officer, 0842 Field artillery radar operator, 0847 Field artillery meteorologist, 2110 Ordnance vehicle maintenance officer, 2131 Towed artillery repairer/technician, 2141 Assault amphibious vehicle repairer/technician, 2146 Main battle tank repairer/technician, 2147 Light armored vehicle repairer/technician, 2149 Ordnance vehicle maintenance chief, 7204 Low altitude air defense officer, and 7212 Low altitude air defense gunner. These MOSs were then opened to women.
- 1 July: MAJ Crissy Cook, United States Army, became the first woman to qualify to command a Bradley fighting tank. This job had recently been opened up to women.
- 25 August: Fort Lee enters lockdown during reports of an active shooter. The individual in question was an enraged female soldier who shot herself in the head after barricading herself inside a major command's headquarters. Nobody else was injured. She was identified as 33-year-old Sgt. 1st Class Paula M. Walker, of Yonkers, N.Y.
- September : The U.S. Navy announced that women could begin to be assigned to the Coastal Riverine Force Joint Terminal Attack Controller (CRF JTAC) training and positions.
- 1 October: GMC Laurie A. Kennedy became the first female Senior Chief Gunner's Mate (GMCS) in the U.S. Coast Guard when she was promoted. At the time she was attached to CGC Waesche (WMSL-751).
- December: Data released by the Defense Department and the Rand Corp. showed that the USMC had the highest level of sexual assaults of against women of any military branch at 8.44%, decreasing from 10.1% from the fiscal year of 2012.
- The U.S. Army began its first study to see how fit soldiers have to be to serve in combat. The study involved 60 women and 100 men.
- U.S. veterans groups sued the U.S. Department of Veterans Affairs due to veterans suffering from PTSD linked to sexual assault being allegedly denied disability claims.
- Kimberly R. Tschepen became the first woman to lead an Idaho National Guard battalion (specifically, the 145th Brigade Support Battalion.)
- CMC (YNCM) Leilani Cale-Jones assumed the new position of Deputy Master Chief Petty Officer of the Coast Guard.
- Sarah Deckert was the 2014 winner of the U.S. Armed Forces Chef of the Year competition, thus making her the first female U.S. Armed Forces Chef of the Year. She was a member of the U.S. Army.
- Caroline Jensen became the first mother and the first female reserve officer to fly in the United States Air Force Thunderbirds.
- Major General Gwen Bingham became the first female commanding general of the U.S. Army TACOM Life Cycle Management Command.
- Kristin Goodwin became the first female bomb wing commander in the U.S. Air Force.
- After an essay written by U.S. Marine Corps 2nd Lt. Sage Santangelo was published in the Washington Post arguing for the change, women were allowed to take the U.S. Marines' Infantry Officer Course twice like their male counterparts, instead of once.
- Twists, dreadlocks, and large cornrows were banned by the U.S. Army, in a move opposed by the women of the Congressional Black Caucus. However, later in 2014 the U.S. Army authorized temporary two-strand twists, increased the size of authorized braids, cornrows, and twists and removed spacing requirements. The U.S. Army also authorized women to wear ponytails during physical training. That same year the U.S. Air Force authorized two-strand twists, French twists and Dutch braids, and the U.S. Navy authorized two-strand twists and braids that hang freely – if they hang above the collar and encompass the whole head.
- The U.S. Department of Veterans Affairs agreed to give survivor benefits to the first-known same-sex war widow, Tracy Dice Johnson, whose wife Donna Johnson died in a suicide bombing attack in 2012.
- Emily Shertzer became the first female Guardsman to win the Lincoln National Guard Marathon's women's category.
- Pfc. Erika Cotton, 19, and Pvt. Stephanie Kasten, 18, of the South Dakota Army National Guard enlisted to serve as Multiple Launch Rocket System crewmembers, becoming the first women to do so in South Dakota. They were both members of Battery A, 1–147th Field Artillery Battalion in Aberdeen.
- Cynthia B. Howard became the first female Transportation Corps senior NCO in the U.S. Army.
- Peggy C. Combs became the first woman to take command over Fort Knox and U.S. Army Cadet Command.
- Almost all Regular Army, National Guard and Army Reserve positions in the U.S. Army coded for field artillery officers were opened to women under a directive issued by Army Secretary John McHugh on 4 March. Specifically, the directive opened to women approximately 1,900 area-of-concentration 13A Field Artillery officer positions in the active component, and 1,700 in the Guard and Reserve. This change applied to cannon battalions down to platoon level, but did not include field artillery positions in special operations units, or positions with "male only" skill identifiers.
- The U.S. Navy declared that women could be assigned to the 267 combat positions in the Coastal Riverine Force that were previously closed to them.
- Sherrie McCandless became the first woman to command the 124th Fighter Wing and, therefore, the first female wing commander in Idaho Air National Guard history.
- Lanette Wright became the first female senior enlisted leader of a Marine Expeditionary Unit in the U.S. Marine Corps.
- The first female U.S. Army National Guard soldiers graduated from Field Artillery School.
- Dina Elosiebo became the D.C. Army National Guard's first female African-American pilot.
- California governor Jerry Brown proclaimed the third week of March as "Women's Military History Week".
- U.S. Army Brig. Gen. Jeffrey Sinclair, who carried on a three-year affair with a female captain under his command and had two other inappropriate relationships with female subordinates, was reprimanded and docked $20,000 in pay, but did not go to jail.
- Vice Adm. Jan Tighe was appointed as the first female commander of a numbered fleet in the U.S. Navy.
- An all-female U.S. Air Force crew set a world record for the longest military flight without aerial refueling, keeping an unmanned reconnaissance aloft for 34.3 hours, breaking the record as part of Women's History Month.
- Spc. Kaitlyne Kisner became the first female certified mine detection dog handler in the U.S. Army.
- Maryanne Walts became the first female command chief master sergeant in the Barnes Air National Guard 104th Fighter Wing, which is in the U.S. Air Force.
- The U.S. Army's Jungle Operations Training Course in Hawaii graduated its first female soldier, Spc. Tinita Taylor.
- Gen. Kerry Muehlenbeck became the first female general in the Arizona National Guard.
- Col. Kimberly Daub became the first female brigade commander at Fort Campbell, Kentucky. She is the commander of the 101st Sustainment Brigade, known as The Lifeliners. This also makes her the first female brigade commander in the history of the 101st Airborne.
- Capt. Elizabeth Rascon became the first female commander of the 1st Cavalry Division Horse Cavalry Detachment in the U.S. Army.
- Kristen Waagbo was named the first women's lacrosse coach at West Point.
- A directive signed by U.S. Army Secretary John McHugh stated that the U.S. Army was opening about 33,000 more jobs to women, with the bulk of the jobs coming from maneuver battalions from about 40 brigade combat teams.
- Col. Cynthia Tinkham of Oklahoma City became the new commander of the 189th Regiment (known as the Oklahoma Regional Training Institute). This was the first time a woman received a major command in the Oklahoma Army National Guard.
- The U.S. Marines began their Ground Combat Element Integrated Task Force. The GCEITF was a co-ed group designed to evaluate and compare the physical performance of male and female Marines in ground combat jobs in order to determine appropriate physical and performance standards for the various specialties.
- Picatinny Arsenal obtained its first all-female command pairing, with Lt. Col. Ingrid Parker and Sgt. Maj. Rosalba Dumont-Carrion.
- Seven new military occupational specialty schools opened to female U.S. Marines; specifically, the schools for the following MOSs: 0331 Machine Gunner, 0341 Mortarman, 0351 Infantry Assaultman, 0352 Anti-Tank Missileman, 1812 M1A1 Tank Crewman, 1833 Assault Amphibious Vehicle Crewmember, and 0811 M60A1 Tank Crewman. However, these schools cannot as of 2014 offer female graduates an MOS designation, so they must pursue a non-infantry specialty following completion of training.
- Cynthia Haines became the first female Chief Master Sgt. of the 116th Air Control Wing's Medical Group in the Georgia Air National Guard in the United States.
- It was announced that starting in October company-grade officers — lieutenants and captains — who had already served in another primary occupation would be allowed to take the U.S. Marines' Infantry Officer Course.
- Maj. Chrissy Cook became the first woman in the 1st Cavalry Division of the U.S. Army to qualify to command a M2A2 Bradley Fighting Vehicle.
- Lori J. Robinson was chosen to be the new commanding general of the Pacific Air Forces in Hawaii, making her the first U.S. female four-star commander of combat forces.
- Katie Higgins, 27, became the first female pilot to join the Blue Angels, the United States Navy's flight demonstration squadron.
- Rear Adm. Babette "Bette" Bolivar took over command of Joint Region Marianas, thus becoming the first woman to occupy the top military post on Guam.
- Samantha Brumley was the first woman to officially become a tank mechanic in the Oregon Army National Guard.
- Tara Robertson took command of the Minnesota National Guard's 849th Mobility Augmentation Company, thus becoming the first woman to command the previously all-male unit.
- Heidi Flemming became the first female commanding officer of Patuxent River Naval Air Station.
- Two female soldiers in the South Korean army, Staff Sgt. Kim Min Kyoung and Staff Sgt. Kwon Min Zy, earned the American Expert Infantryman Badge, making them the first women, Korean or American, to do so.
- Verna L. Jones was appointed as the first female executive director of the American Legion.
- Marine officials announced in a 12 Nov. administrative message that female Marines in the ranks of corporal and above were now eligible to fill some 2,600 previously closed jobs in active and Reserve units.
- Diane Dunn became the first woman to command a Maine Army National Guard brigade (specifically, the 120th).
- Elizabeth Bohannon became the first female chief warrant officer 5 in the North Carolina National Guard.
- Alicia Dorsett reported to her unit in the Milwaukee-based 1st Battalion, 121st Field Artillery, thus becoming the first woman to serve as a field artillery officer in the Wisconsin Army National Guard.

== 2015 ==
- Col. Bobbi Doorenbos became the first female commander of the Arkansas Air National Guard's 188th Wing.
- The first woman reported to the USS Minnesota, thus becoming the first woman to serve aboard a U.S. Navy fast-attack submarine.
- Ret. U.S. Army Col. Laurel Hummel was appointed as the first woman to lead Alaska's National Guard.
- On 9, January Sgt. Raquel DiDomenico reported as the new first sergeant of the 374th Engineer Company (Sapper) in Concord, California, becoming the first female combat engineer senior sergeant who was 12Z qualified to hold this leadership position in a Sapper unit.
- Army Secretary John McHugh issued a 27 Feb. directive authorizing more than 4,100 officer and enlisted "men only" positions in special operations units of the Regular Army, National Guard and Army Reserve to be opened to women. The organizations being opened to women as a result of 27 Feb. directive from Army Secretary John McHugh are: Army Special Operations Command (Airborne), Army National Guard Special Forces Group (Airborne) Battalions, Military Information Support Operations Command Tactical Psychological Teams, Special Forces Military Free Fall Operations, and associated additional skill identifiers 4X for officers and W8 for enlisted soldiers.
- The Army announced in February that five women had passed the first-ever gender-integrated Ranger Training Assessment Course, which was a two-week pre-qualification for the special operations training.
- Linda Singh became the first woman and the first African-American to hold the position of commander for the Maryland Army National Guard.
- Col. Alicia A. Tate-Nadeau was promoted to brigadier general, making her the first female in the Illinois National Guard to earn the rank, and the first female in Illinois National Guard history to be promoted as a general officer.

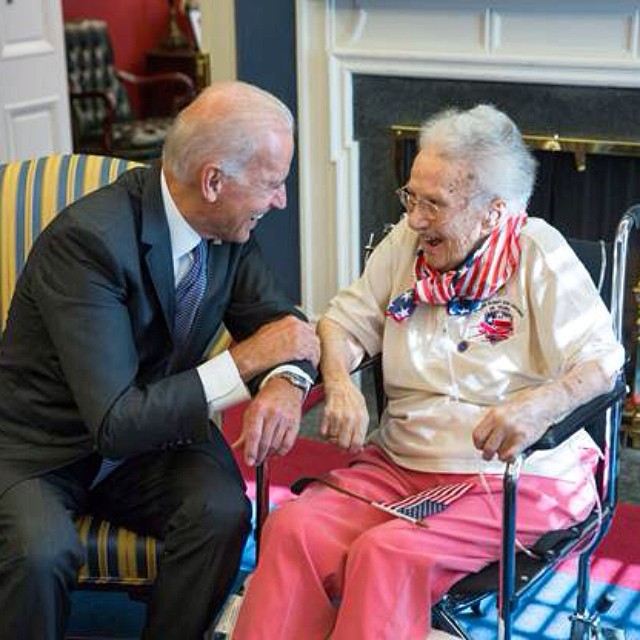
Lucy Coffey, the oldest female veteran at age 108, meeting with Vice President Joe Biden in 2014 at the White House.

- Alishia Bauman was promoted to captain, becoming the first female primary staff officer in the history of the 1st Battalion, 168th Infantry of the Iowa Army National Guard. Also, according to her, as battalion logistics officer, she is the first woman in a management position (technically an infantry officer) for the unit based in Council Bluffs.
- America's oldest female veteran at the time, Lucy Coffey, died at the age of 108. She had joined the Women's Army Auxiliary Corps in 1943 and was honorably discharged in 1945, but continued to serve as an accountant and statistician. Thirteen years later, she transferred to Kelly Air Force Base and retired.
- California governor Jerry Brown proclaimed the third week of March as "Women's Military History Week".
- Brenda Sue Fulton was named the first female chairperson of the Board of Visitors at West Point.
- Lt. Col. Christine Mau of the U.S. Air Force became the first U.S. female pilot to fly the F-35 Lightning II jet.
- Col. Giselle "Gigi" Wilz was promoted to brigadier general, thus becoming the first female general in the North Dakota Army National Guard. Later that year, she took office as the 21st (and first female) Commander of NATO Headquarters Sarajevo.
- The Oklahoma Army National Guard named Jamie Ellis as its first female Army combat arms officer.
- Marjana Mair Bidwell became the first woman to assume command of the 3rd U.S. Infantry Regiment Headquarters Company.
- June 8 – General Ellen M. Pawlikowski assumed command of Air Force Materiel Command.
- Army Secretary John McHugh issued a directive on June 16 which made available 20,563 additional positions for women and opened the last of the 16 engineer MOSs (MOS 12B, Combat Engineer), which were closed to women.
- Mackenzie Clarke became the first female combat engineer to enlist in the Army National Guard.
- Clydellia Prichard-Allen became Columbus, Ohio's first female army recruiting commander.
- Erika Lopez became the first woman in Tennessee to enlist in the Army as a combat engineer.
- 110-year-old Emma Didlake, America's oldest veteran at the time, met President Obama at the White House. She was an African-American World War II veteran who joined the Army in 1943, and her decorations include the Women's Army Corps Service Medal, American Campaign Medal, and World War II Victory Medal.
- Tracci Dorgan became the first female field artillery officer in the South Carolina National Guard.
- Vice Adm. Nora Tyson was installed as the new commander of the Navy's Third Fleet, making her the first woman to lead a U.S. Navy ship fleet.
- Jeanne Pace, at the time the longest-tenured female warrant officer and the last former member of the Women's Army Corps on active duty, retired. She had joined the WAC in 1972.
- Diana M. Holland became the first woman to serve as a general officer at Fort Drum, and the first woman to serve as a deputy commanding general in one of the Army's light infantry divisions (specifically, the 10th Mountain Division.) In December, she was appointed as the first female commandant of cadets at West Point.
- Cheryl Hansen became the first female commander of the Naval Construction Battalion Center in Gulfport, Mississippi.
- Kyara Johnson became the first female crew member of the U.S. Air Force's F-22 Raptor Demonstration Team.
- Lt. Shaye Haver and Capt. Kristen Griest became the first women to graduate Ranger School.
- Shortly after the first women graduated Ranger School, Ranger School was permanently opened to women.
- Meosha Morris became the first woman to be sworn in as a noncommissioned combat engineer in the U.S. Army.
- Deanna Holliman became the first female officer to branch into combat arms for the Oregon Army National Guard, when she graduated as a field artillery officer.
- The first all-female Honor Flight was held, with 140 female veterans.
- Defense Secretary Ashton Carter announced that the Pentagon would allow troops and civilian workers time during the workday to gather in "Lean In" circles, which are informal discussion groups focused on advancing women in the workplace.
- Mary Link became the first female commander of the Army Reserve Medical Command.
- A Marine female engagement team ended a mission in Qatar — the first mission for the all-women teams since the Corps disbanded them in Afghanistan three years ago.
- Lisa Jaster became the first female reservist to graduate Ranger School.
- An Army directive officially opened more than 19,700 field artillery jobs to women. It applied to the active Army, Army National Guard and Army Reserve, and made jobs in the 13B (cannon crewmember) and 13D (field artillery automated tactical data system specialist) military occupational specialties available for fill by qualified female soldiers. It also opened the U6 Additional Skill Identifier, which is field artillery weapons maintenance.
- Theresa Prince became the first woman to receive the rank of brigadier general in the South Carolina Air Guard.
- Julie Corgan became the first woman to join the Army as a cannon crewmember.
- Gina Grosso became the first female personnel chief in the Air Force.
- Skylar Anderson became the first female soldier in America to be awarded the 12B MOS code as a combat engineer.
- Lauren Edwards became the first woman in Marine Corps history to assume command of an engineer support battalion (specifically, the 8th Engineer Support Battalion.)
- In December 2015, Defense Secretary Ash Carter stated that starting in 2016 all combat jobs would open to women.
- Hannah I. Sather (17) became the first female to enlist as a field artillery automated tactical data systems specialist in the Minnesota Army National Guard, December 14, 2015.
- Journae Q. King made history for the Louisiana Army National Guard as the first female to enlist as a field artillery automated tactical data systems specialist.
- Melanie Hindley became the first woman to graduate from the Bradley Leader Course; she was also the first woman to attend it.
- McKenzie Griffin from Deer Park, Washington, in the Spokane area, enlisted as a combat engineer, making her the first woman from Washington to join the Army with the intention of filling a combat role.
- The Army issued an updated breastfeeding policy which states that soldiers must be given space to pump breastmilk, and the space must be "a private space, other than a restroom, with locking capabilities for a soldier to breastfeed or express milk", and must have a place to sit, a flat surface other than the floor to place the pump, an electrical outlet and access to a "safe water source" near the pumping area. The updated policy also states that although breastfeeding soldiers will still be required to take part in field training or deployment, commanders must give them time and space to pump and, if needed, discard breastmilk just as they would in garrison. It also instructs commanders to give soldiers "adequate time" to express milk, while further clarifying that time requirements may vary depending on a variety of factors, including the age of the baby. This updated policy supersedes a rule from September 29, 2015; prior to that September rule, the Army was the only service without an established, service-wide standard governing female soldiers and breastfeeding.
- Alyssa Brenner reported to her Oconomowoc-based unit, Battery C, 1st Battalion, 120th Field Artillery, thus becoming the first female field artillery officer in the 32nd Infantry Brigade Combat Team's lone artillery battalion.
- Tianna Langdon became the first woman in Washington state to enlist as a cannon crew member.
- Nadja Y. West was sworn in as the 44th Army Surgeon General and Commanding General, U.S. Army Medical Command (MEDCOM). This makes West the Army's first black Surgeon General, as well as the Army's first black woman to hold the rank of lieutenant general and the Army's highest ranking woman who graduated from West Point.
- The Marines decided to allow some types of twist and loc hairstyles for women. This made the Marine Corps the first military branch to allow locs. Allowing locs and twists in the Marines was driven by the recommendations of Staff Sgt. Cherie Wright, who was assigned to II Marine Expeditionary Force.
- Adrianna Vorderbruggen died in combat; she is believed to be the first active duty, openly gay, female service member to die in combat, and is the first openly gay Air Force officer to die in combat.
- Mary Connolly became the first female soldier in the Michigan National Guard assigned to an artillery unit.

== 2016 ==
- From 1960 to June 30, 2016, there was a blanket ban on all transgender people, including but not limited to transgender women, from serving and enlisting in the United States military. From June 30, 2016, to April 11, 2019, transgender personnel in the United States military were allowed to serve in their preferred gender upon completing transition. From January 1, 2018, to April 11, 2019, transgender individuals could enlist in the United States military under the condition of being stable for 18 months in their preferred or biological gender.
- Marie Watkins became the first Missouri National Guard female infantry heavy weapons company commander; she commanded Delta Company, 1-138th Infantry Battalion, from December 2016 to November 2019.
- Dawn M. Ferrell became the first woman in the Texas Air National Guard to be promoted to brigadier general.
- Abby Sapp became the first woman in Kentucky to enlist in the U.S. Army in a combat arms military occupational specialty following Secretary of Defense Ash Carter's announcement in December 2015 that women would be allowed in combat roles once reserved only for men; she enlisted as a combat engineer – a job with the Army designation of 12 "Bravo".
- Defense Secretary Ash Carter announced a new policy granting women 12 weeks maternity leave in all services.
- Defense Secretary Ash Carter announced plans to create 3,600 new breast-feeding rooms across the country, which he said would put a breast-feeding room in all military buildings that have more than 50 female employees.
- CDR Zeita Merchant took command of Marine Safety Unit Chicago, becoming the first African-American female to command a Prevention/Marine Safety Unit/Office in the Coast Guard.
- Alyce Dixon, the oldest American female veteran at the time, died at 108 years old. She joined the military in 1943 and was one of the first African-American women in the Army. As a member of the Women's Army Corps, she was stationed in England and France where she played an important role in the postal service as part of the 6888th Central Postal Directory Battalion.
- Kelly Elizabeth Wilson became Alabama's first woman to have an Army military combat role (as a combat engineer).
- Paige B. Hunter became the first female brigadier general in West Virginia National Guard history.
- Jennifer Smith became the first female commanding officer of Field Medical Training Battalion-East.
- Sandy Best became the first female brigadier general in the Minnesota National Guard.
- The United States Army Mid-Atlantic Recruiting Battalion in Toms River enlisted Alex Palmieri as its first woman in a combat role from the Central Jersey area (as a combat engineer).
- Operations Specialist 3rd Class Abril Ramirez, an El Paso, Texas, native stationed aboard USS Halsey (DDG-97) became the first female sailor to wrestle for the All-Navy Sports (ANS) wrestling team Feb. 20.
- Katherine Beatty became the first woman in the U.S. Army to graduate from advanced individual training (AIT) as a cannon crew member.
- The U.S. Marine Corps made it easier for women to cover up tattoos by allowing them to wear crew-neck undershirts beneath their uniforms. The Marines made the change after U.S. Rep. Chellie Pingree complained that their dress policy unintentionally discriminated against female recruits.
- In March 2016 Defense Secretary Ash Carter approved final plans from military service branches and the U.S. Special Operations Command to open all combat jobs to women, and authorized the military to begin integrating female combat soldiers "right away."
- Sharon Campbell became the 94th Training Division's first female senior enlisted advisor; the 94th Training Division is part of the U.S. Army.
- Miranda Smith became the first female soldier in the U.S. Army to join the 3d U.S. Infantry Regiment (The Old Guard) Continental Color Guard.
- Ninety female missileers made Air Force history March 22 as the first all-female missile alert crews to serve on alert at three intercontinental ballistic missile wings simultaneously. In honor of Women's History Month, missileers based out of Minot Air Force Base, North Dakota; F.E. Warren AFB, Wyoming; and Malmstrom AFB, Montana, completed a 24-hour alert shift to sustain an active alert status of the nation's ICBM force.
- Wendy Johnson became the first female brigadier general in the Nebraska Air National Guard.
- Joane Mathews became the first female brigadier general in the Wisconsin Army National Guard.
- Tammy Barnett became the first woman to enlist in the infantry in the United States Army.
- Jeannie Leavitt became the first woman to take control of the 57th Wing of Nellis Air Force Base.
- A female lance corporal in the Marines requested a lateral move into an infantry "military occupational specialty," making her the first female Marine to sign up for the infantry.
- The U.S. Army enlisted Colorado's first female into the infantry (Kayleigh Schlag).
- Kristen Marie Griest became the first female infantry officer in the U.S. Army when the Army approved her request to transfer there from a military police unit.
- The Senate confirmed Air Force Gen. Lori Robinson as the new head of U.S. Northern Command, making her the first woman to command a major Unified Combatant Command.
- Tara McCaig became the first female enlistee from Utah to enlist for the infantry.
- Kayci Landes became the first woman to re-enlist as a 19D cavalry scout in the Army.
- Ashley Wedge became the first woman in North Carolina to sign up for a combat job (she signed up for the Army infantry).
- Caitlin Joy May became the first female enlistee from Wyoming and the third overall nationwide to enlist for the U.S. Army Infantry.
- Shelby Sparkman and Hannah Carpenter enlisted at the same time and thus became the first females to enlist in the infantry in Texas.
- Virginia Brodie and Katherine Boy became the first two female Marine artillery officers to complete the Field Artillery Basic Officers Leadership Course. Virginia Brodie graduated number one of the 137 students in both the gunnery portion of the course and in overall score and was recognized as her class' distinguished honor graduate.
- The first seven women were commissioned as second lieutenants into combat divisions after graduating from West Point.
- Starting in 2002 deceased WASPS were able to be buried in Arlington National Cemetery; however, that right was revoked in 2015 and was not regained for them until 2016.
- Catherine Zorn became the first woman from Minnesota to go into the Army infantry.
- Bailey Richardson became the first female student to win the most prestigious and complete scholarship offered by The Citadel, the Star of the West Undergraduate Scholarship.
- Shelby Atkins became the first female Army noncommissioned officer to be granted the infantry military occupational specialty.
- Leah Mullenix became the first female to complete the Army's Best Sapper competition and place in the top 10.
- Tamhra Hutchins-Frye became the first woman to be promoted to general in the history of the Arkansas Air National Guard.
- The 225th Engineer's Brigade in the Army National Guard got its first female commander, Cindy Haygood.
- Tristan Guzman became the first female in the history of the state of Kansas to enlist as an infantry soldier.
- Virginia Doonan became the first female wing commander in the history of the 102nd Intelligence Wing in the U.S. Air Force.
- Regina Sabric became the first female commander of the 919th Special Operations Group in the U.S. Air Force.
- Cindy R. Jebb became West Point's first female dean of the academic board.
- Sgt. 1st Class Erin Smith of the Idaho Army National Guard became America's first female enlisted soldier to graduate from the U.S. Army's M1 Armor Crewman School.
- Sgt. 1st Class Sarah Saunders became the first female graduate of the U.S. Army's Master Gunner Common Core Course.
- Tammy Smith became the first female general officer to serve in an Eighth Army headquarters-level position when she became the Eighth Army Deputy Commanding General for Sustainment.
- Maryanne Miller became the first woman to be promoted to three-star general and Chief/Commander of the Air Force Reserve.
- Rylee Nunn became the first female from the San Diego region to enlist in the infantry of the Army.
- Shana E. Peck became the first woman to take command of Fort Bliss' 11th Air Defense Artillery Brigade.
- Amy Giaquinto became the first woman to hold the top enlisted airman's position in the New York Air National Guard (command chief master sergeant).
- Spc. Rachel Mayhew became the first female in the Texas Army National Guard awarded the 12B combat engineer military occupational specialty.
- Dominique Saavedra became the first enlisted female sailor to earn her submarine qualification.
- Christine Burckle became the first female general of the Utah National Guard.
- 2LT Felicia Nielsen became the first female in the military to qualify as a tank commander at Fort Hood, TX, in August 2016.
- Christy Wise became the sixth person and first female to be cleared to fly for the U.S. military again following an above-the-knee amputation.
- An unnamed female staff sergeant tried out for the 75th Ranger Regiment via the 75th Ranger Regiment's Ranger Assessment and Selection Program 2 (RASP 2) June 16, but did not meet performance objectives required for assignment to the 75th Ranger Regiment, and was afforded the opportunity to reapply for RASP 2 beginning December 2016.
- The first female soldier to participate in the Army's initial training program for the Green Berets failed to complete the course although she passed the first half of the 21-day weeding-out process, during which 10 percent to 15 percent of her classmates dropped out.
- Anissa Martinez became the first New Mexico woman to enlist in the U.S. Army infantry.
- Johanna Clyborne became the first woman to earn brigadier general rank in the Minnesota Army National Guard.
- The first Marine Corps Forces Special Operations Command assessment and selection course to admit female Marines had one woman make it to the end of the first phase. A female corporal stayed in the 19-day course until its completion at the end of August, but did not have the minimum academic and physical training scores needed to make it to the second phase. The Marine, who was not publicly identified, planned to re-attempt the assessment and selection (A&S) phase when the next cycle began early in the new year.
- The first woman to enter training to become a tactical air control party airman left shortly thereafter due to an injury.
- Ten Army women became the first women to graduate from the Army's Infantry Basic Officer Leader's Course.
- Kayci Landes became the first woman in the Army to graduate as a 19D Cavalry Scout.
- Thirteen female Army officers graduated from the Basic Armor Officer Leadership Course at Fort Benning, becoming the service's first female armor officers.
- A woman passed the 75th Ranger Regiment's Ranger Assessment and Selection Program II program in December, thus making the 75th Ranger Regiment the first special operations unit to have a female soldier graduate its selection course.

== 2017 ==
- For the first time, the Marine Corps put three enlisted female Marines in a ground combat unit (specifically, an infantry unit) once open only to men.
- Guam Army National Guard Captain Leona Campbell became the first woman to take command of an infantry company.
- Carol Timmons became the first woman to lead the Delaware National Guard.
- Erika Perry became the first female commander of the South Carolina National Guard 51st Military Police (MP) Battalion.
- Sadie O. Horton, who spent World War II working aboard a coastwise U.S. Merchant Marine barge, posthumously received official veteran's status for her wartime service, becoming the first recorded female Merchant Marine veteran of World War II.
- The South Carolina Air National Guard's 169th Fighter Wing obtained its first female Chief Master Sergeant in maintenance (Rosemary Hawthorne).
- Maria Daume, who was born in a Siberian prison and later adopted by Americans, became the first female Marine to join the infantry through the traditional entry-level training process.
- Lillian Polatchek became the first female Marine to graduate from the Army's Armor Basic Officer Leaders Course; she graduated at the top of her class. She thus became the Marine Corps' first female tank officer.
- Sgt. Dakota Demers became Colorado's first female infantry soldier when she graduated from the 11B Infantry Transition Course at Umatilla Army Depot in Oregon. Staff Sgt. Melanie Galletti with the Idaho National Guard's Headquarters and Headquarters Company, 116th Cavalry Brigade Combat Team, and Staff Sgt. Cyndi Pearl Baltezore with the California National Guard's HHC 1-185th Infantry Battalion (Stryker Brigade Combat Team) graduated the course with her and also became the first female infantry soldiers in their states.
- Sheryl Padilla became the first female infantry officer to serve in the Guam National Guard.
- The Army announced that female soldiers are allowed to wear either the blue Army skirt or slacks with the Army Service Uniform during social functions.
- 18 women graduated from the Army's first gender-integrated infantry basic training.
- Megan A. Brogden assumed command of the Group Support Battalion, 3rd Special Forces Group, thus becoming the first woman to assume command of a battalion within any of the Army's seven Special Forces groups.
- The first women graduated the Army's Cavalry School at Fort Benning.
- Jennifer M. Short became the first female commander of the 23rd Wing at Moody Air Force Base.
- Brigadier General Donna Martin became the first black female commandant of the U.S. Army Military Police School.
- Governor Kay Ivey announced that she had appointed Major General Sheryl Gordon as the first female Adjutant General of the Alabama National Guard, upon the retirement of Major General Perry Smith.
- Lisa Bryan was promoted to chief warrant officer five, which made her the first Native American woman to be promoted to the highest rank in the National Guard Warrant Officer Corps.
- Joanne F. Sheridan became the first female two-star general in the Louisiana National Guard.
- Tasheenia L. Wallace became the first woman to finish the Arkansas National Guard infantry course.
- Zona Hornstra became the first female wing command chief of the South Dakota Air National Guard 114th Fighter Wing.
- The Air Force's first female enlisted pilot completed Undergraduate Remotely Piloted Aircraft Training.
- Denise Donnell became the first female commander of the New York Air National Guard 105th Airlift Wing at Stewart International Airport.
- Simone Askew became the first African-American woman to be the First Captain of the U.S. Military Academy's Corps of Cadets.
- The first woman graduated from the infantry officer course of the Marine Corps; her name was not initially made public, but was eventually revealed as Marina A. Hierl. Hierl later became the first woman to lead a Marine infantry platoon.
- Mariah Klenke became the first female officer to graduate from the Marines' Assault Amphibian Officer course.
- Michele Kilgore became the first woman to command the 109 Airlift Wing at Stratton Air Base in Scotia, New York.
- For the first time, the Defense Health Agency approved payment for sex reassignment surgery for an active-duty service member; the patient identifies as a woman, according to a source close to her.
- In October 2017, Amy Giaquinto became the first Air National Guard member–and the first woman–to serve as the top enlisted advisor to the adjutant general of New York.
- Six women became the first in the U.S. Army to earn the Expert Infantryman Badge.
- Natalie Mallue became the first woman to hold both the Ranger and Sapper tabs in the U.S. Army.

== 2018 ==
- From January 1, 2018, to April 11, 2019, transgender individuals, including but not limited to transgender women, could enlist in the United States military under the condition of being stable for 18 months in their preferred or biological gender.
- In early 2018, Col. Lorna M. Mahlock became the first African American woman to be nominated as a Brigadier general (one star) in the United States Marine Corps.
- Autumn Reeves became the Florida National Guard's first female 13F, also known as forward observer (FO).
- Kelley Thury was named as the first woman to serve as a chaplain in the South Dakota National Guard.
- Allison Miller became the first woman to lead an Ohio Air National Guard wing (specifically, Mansfield's 179th Airlift Wing.)
- Regina A. Sabric became the first woman to command Utah's 419th Fighter Wing.
- Emily Lilly became America's first female Army National Guard soldier to graduate from the Army's Ranger School.
- Sarah Zorn became the first woman chosen to lead the Corps of Cadets at The Citadel, The Military College of South Carolina.
- Teresa Domeier was chosen as the first female command chief warrant officer at the National Guard Bureau in Arlington, Virginia.
- Seretta Lawson was promoted to the rank of sergeant major, thus becoming the first African-American woman to reach that rank in the Oklahoma Guard.
- Wendy Johnson became the first woman to lead the Nebraska Air National Guard.
- Michelle I. Macander took over as commanding officer of 1st Combat Engineer Battalion, 1st Marine Division, thus becoming the first female Marine to command a ground combat arms unit.
- Patricia Csank became the first female commander of Joint Base Elmendorf-Richardson.
- Rear Admiral Michelle Skubic became the first woman to lead both NAVSUP and the Supply Corps.
- Kayla Freeman graduated from Fort Rucker's Army Aviation school on June 21, thus becoming the first black female pilot in the Alabama National Guard.
- Leslie R. Greenfield became the California Army National Guard's first female infantry officer.
- Female sailors in the Navy became allowed to wear their hair in ponytails, locks, wider buns and at times below their collars, although subject to strict guidelines on the matter.
- Gail Atkins became the first woman to lead the Corpus Christi Army Depot.
- Donna Prigmore became the first woman in the Oregon Air National Guard to be promoted to the rank of brigadier general and the first woman in the Oregon National Guard to become a general officer as a traditional, part-time Guardsman.
- Gloria Babauta became the first Guam Guard woman to complete the Infantry Transition Course.
- Veronica Hanna became the first woman in the Navy to be promoted to the rank of Chief Warrant Officer 5 in the field of information systems technology.
- An unnamed female marine became the second woman to graduate from the Marine Infantry Officer Course.
- The Coast Guard awarded the CAPT DAVID H. JARVIS Award to CDR Zeita Merchant, making her the first African-American female to be given this award.
- Ashley Hurd became the first female armor officer in the North Carolina National Guard.
- Caitlin (last name not disclosed to the public) became North Carolina's first female infantry officer.
- Estella Blas Aguon became the first female Guam Army National Guard member to complete the Ranger Training Assessment Course at the U.S. Army Warrior Training Center at Fort Benning, Georgia.
- Amanda Kelley became the first female enlisted soldier to graduate from Ranger School.
- Kim Lefebvre became the first woman to assume command of the Naval Submarine Medical Research Laboratory (NSMRL).
- Vicki Jones became the first female inductee into the Oklahoma Army National Guard Officer Candidate School's Hall of Fame.
- Atta Suzuki and Remedios Madrio became the first women to enlist in the Guam National Guard as infantrymen.
- Bailey Weis became the first woman to make it through Phase Two of Marine Corps Forces Special Operations Command's Assessment and Selection course; however, she was not chosen to continue in the training pipeline, and decided to leave the Marine Corps.
- Rosemary Masters was promoted to the rank of chief warrant officer 5, making her the first woman in the Oklahoma Army National Guard to be promoted to the rank of chief warrant officer 5.
- The first woman successfully completed Special Forces Assessment and Selection and was selected to attend the Special Forces Qualification Course in hopes of becoming one of the Green Berets; her name was not given publicly.
- November Company, 4th Recruit Training Battalion, became the first company to graduate female Marines who wore a new female dress blue uniform including the mandarin collar. Previously, in August 2018, female recruits with Platoon 4040, Papa Company, had become the first to be issued that uniform.
- Tina Lipscomb became the first female Hispanic Arkansas Air National Guard colonel.
- Erica Ingram became the first black female colonel in the Arkansas National Guard.
- Karen Berry became the first woman in the Delaware Army National Guard promoted to brigadier general.
- Tracy Norris was named as the first female adjutant general of Texas Military Department.
- Hailey Falk became the Army's first enlisted female Soldier to graduate from the Sapper Leader Course.
- The Texas Air National Guard made Dawn Ferrell its first female two-star general.
- Rachael Winiecki completed the first F-35 Lightning II flight test done by a woman.
- A state National Guard — Maryland's — became led by a command staff of all women for the first time.

== 2019 ==
- From 1960 to June 30, 2016, there was a blanket ban on all transgender people, including but not limited to transgender women, from serving and enlisting in the United States military. From June 30, 2016, to April 11, 2019, transgender personnel in the United States military were allowed to serve in their preferred gender upon completing transition. From January 1, 2018, to April 11, 2019, transgender individuals could enlist in the United States military under the condition of being stable for 18 months in their preferred or biological gender.
- Autumn Reeves became the first woman in the Florida National Guard to complete the Joint Fires Observer (JFO) course, which occurred in July 2019.
- The first female Marine graduated from the Corps' Winter Mountain Leaders Course; her name was Tara-Lyn Baker.
- For the first time in Georgia Air National Guard history, the 116th Air Control Wing promoted a woman within the maintenance career field to the rank of chief master sergeant; her name was Jaimie Banks.
- Shannon Kent became the first female Navy service member to be killed in the fight against ISIS that began in 2014.
- The Oklahoma Army National Guard acquired its first female general, Brig. Gen. Cynthia Tinkham.
- At Rosemary Bryant Mariner's funeral on February 2, 2019, for the first time in history the Navy conducted a flyover using all female pilots. The nine pilots participated in a Missing Man Flyover at the cemetery in Maynardville, Tennessee.

- On February 4, the Air Force named Zoe "SiS" Kotnik as its first female commander of a single-aircraft demonstration team. She was relieved less than two weeks later, due to a "loss of confidence" in her ability to lead.
- Ronaqua Russel of the Coast Guard became the first African-American female aviator to be awarded the Air Medal.
- The transgender women Army Capt. Alivia Stehlik, Army Capt. Jennifer Peace, Army Staff Sgt. Patricia King and Navy Petty Officer 3rd Class Akira Wyatt, as well as a transgender man (Blake Drehmann of the Navy), became the first openly transgender members of the United States military to testify publicly in front of Congress when they testified in front of the House Armed Services Committee in support of openly transgender people serving in the military.
- Capt. Amie Kemppainen took command of B Company, 3rd Battalion, 126th Infantry Regiment, which made her the first female infantry commander in the history of the Michigan National Guard.
- Tracey Poirier became the first female commander of the 124th Regiment Regional Training Institute.
- 2nd Lt. Tatiana Miranda, a platoon leader from 2nd Battalion 34th Armor Regiment, 1st Armored Brigade Combat Team, 1st Infantry Division became the first female officer in the 1st ABCT to qualify with an Abrams tank.
- Marines with India Company, 3rd Recruit Training Battalion, which was the first combined company of female and male recruits, graduated at Marine Corps Recruit Depot Parris Island.
- Janina Simmons completed Army Ranger School, making her the first female African American soldier to graduate from the course.
- The Wisconsin National Guard enlisted its first female infantry soldier, Emily Buchholtz.
- Lt. Col. Meghann O. Plumlee became the first woman to take command of the 101st Engineer Battalion in the Massachusetts Army National Guard.
- Dianna Wolfson became the first female commander of the Puget Sound Naval Shipyard & Intermediate Maintenance Facility.
- It was announced that the U.S. Navy named Shoshana S. Chatfield as the first female leader of the U.S. Naval War College. On August 1, 2019, she took command as such.
- Laura Yeager became the first woman to lead a US Army infantry division (specifically, the California National Guard's 40th Infantry Division.)
- The Navy announced that women could wear smooth or synthetic leather flat shoes in service and service dress uniforms, and that nursing T-shirts could be worn with service uniforms, NWU Type I, II and III and flight suits.
- Laura Richardson became the first female commander of Army North.
- Stefanie Horvath became the first openly lesbian brigadier general in the Minnesota Army National Guard.
- Navy leaders announced that women could apply to move into any one of 11 non-nuclear submarine ratings on a rolling basis. Enlisted women in the Navy previously could only apply to serve on specific submarines during set application windows. Nuclear ratings are open to new female enlistees in the Navy, but female sailors currently serving in other ratings can only apply to switch into some non-nuclear jobs.
- Catherine Stark became the first female Marine to be assigned to the U.S. Navy's F-35C fleet replacement squadron.
- Veronica Lasch became the first woman to join the South Carolina National Guard Infantry.
- Anneliese Satz became the first female Marine F-35B pilot having completed the syllabus on the STOVL version of the Lightning II on June 27, 2019.
- Jenna Schaack graduated from the United States Armor School, making her the first female Armor Officer in the Montana Army National Guard.
- Melissa Coburn became the first female commander of March Air Reserve Base.
- Chelsey Hibsch became the first female airman to earn the Army's Ranger tab.
- Megan Browning became the first female Marine Corps vocalist.
- The Army Engineer Research and Development Center obtained its first female commander, Col. Teresa Schlosser.
- Johanna Clyborne became the first woman in the Minnesota National Guard to achieve the rank of two-star general.
- Alexa Barth became the first female Marine to pass the Basic Reconnaissance Course and earn the 0321 reconnaissance Marine military occupational specialty.
- A woman managed to successfully complete SEAL training, but opted to join another unit of the Navy.
- The first enlisted female Army National Guard soldiers graduated from the Army Ranger School; they were Staff Sgt. Jessica Smiley and Sgt. Danielle Faber, with the South Carolina Army National Guard and Pennsylvania Army National Guard, respectively.
- Jessica Pauley became the first female infantry officer in the Idaho Army National Guard.
- Ana-Alicia Bennett became the first woman to enlist under the 11B "Infantryman" MOS designation in the ranks of the Virginia Army National Guard.
- The Air Force commissioned its first female Muslim chaplain, Saleha Jabeen.
- The Air Force began requiring units to give nursing mothers access to a lactation room, and offering guidance for lactation breaks.
- The Air Force released a new policy allowing fully qualified pilots, missile operations duty crews and remotely piloted aircrew the option to continue in their jobs while pregnant.

== 2020 ==
- On July 23 the Space Force obtained its first all-female space operations crew.
- On August 17 Nina Armagno became the first female Air Force general officer to transfer to the Space Force and the first female general officer in the Space Force.
- On October 1 Taryn Stys and Karmann-Monique Pogue were each promoted to chief master sergeant, making them the first women in the Space Force to be so promoted.
- Kathryn Dawley became the first female commanding officer of the guided-missile destroyer Hopper, named after Grace Hopper, which also made her the first female officer to command a Navy ship named for a woman. However, in 2021 Dawley was fired due to a "loss of confidence in her leadership".
- Remoshay Nelson became the first black female officer to join the Thunderbirds.
- Kristin "Beo" Wolfe became the U.S. Air Force's F-35 Joint Strike Fighter demonstration team's first female commander.
- Katarina Schumacher became the first woman in the Nevada National Guard to successfully finish the required training to operate a tank and lead her own platoon.
- Julianna Yakovac became the first woman to graduate from the Marine Corps' Howitzer Section Chief Course.
- Thessa Washington became the first African-American woman C-130H pilot at the 165th Airlift Wing.
- Deanna Franks was named the first female commandant of the Advanced Airlift Tactics Training Center of the 139th Airlift Wing.
- Maj. Caitlin Reilly and Col. Tyler Nicklaus "Nick" Hague received the Col. James Jabara Award for Airmanship, which is given to Air Force Academy graduates "whose accomplishments demonstrate superior performance in fields directly involved with aerospace vehicles"; this made Reilly the first woman to receive the award.
- Melissa Bert became the Coast Guard's first female Judge Advocate General.
- Yolondria Dixon-Carter was named as the first female senior warrant officer advisor to the chief of staff of the Army.
- Janice Smith became the first African-American woman to head the Military Sealift Command Atlantic.
- Jocelyn Schermerhorn became the first woman to command an Air Force Special Operations Wing.
- JoAnne S. Bass became the first female senior enlisted service member of any U.S. military branch, and the first person of Asian-American descent to hold the senior enlisted position in the Air Force, as the 19th Chief Master Sergeant of the Air Force.
- Meredith Conn became the first female senior enlisted leader for the Wisconsin Air National Guard.
- Emily Thompson became the first woman to fly an F-35A Lightning II into combat.
- Laura Clellan was appointed as the first female Adjutant General of the Colorado National Guard.
- The first woman joined the Green Berets.
- Annie Lee became the first female battalion commander of the Mississippi National Guard's largest unit, the 155th Armored Brigade Combat Team.
- Samira McBride became the first female recipient of the Master Chief Petty Officer of the Navy Delbert D. Black Leadership Award.
- Madeline Swegle became the Navy's first black female tactical jet pilot.
- Candice Bowen became the first woman to take command of a Virginia National Guard infantry company when she took command of the 116th Infantry Brigade Combat Team.
- Diana L. Dunn became the Maine Army National Guard's first female general officer when she was promoted to the rank of brigadier general.
- Jody Daniels became the first woman to lead the Army Reserve.
- Serena Johnson became the first African American Garrison Commander of Parks Reserve Forces Training Area.
- Male-only wording in the Air Force Song was changed.
- The Air Force changed its policy so as to allow all pregnant and postpartum airmen to attend professional military education.
- The Air Force changed its policy so as to allow women to wear pants or a standard-length skirt or a floor-length skirt with their mess dress uniforms; women were previously only allowed to wear a floor-length skirt with those uniforms.
- Monica Lawson became the first active-duty African American woman chaplain promoted to the rank of colonel by the Army.
- Adria Zuccaro of the Wisconsin Air National Guard became the first woman to lead the 128th Air Refueling Wing.
- The Navy SEALs and the Navy Special Warfare Combatant-craft Crewmen changed their creed and ethos statements to make them gender-neutral, removing gendered terms like "brotherhood."
- Ciera Balch became the first woman to win Noncommissioned Officer (NCO) of the Year at the Montana Army National Guard Best Warrior competition.
- Dawne L. Deskins became the first female deputy director of the Air National Guard.
- The U.S. Naval Academy named its first African-American female brigade commander – Midshipman 1st Class Sydney Barber.
- Martha Castleton became the first female Command Chief Master Sergeant in the Utah Air National Guard's 151st Air Refueling Wing Command.
- Wanda N. Williams became the first black woman to take leadership of the Kaiserslautern-based 7th Mission Support Command.
- Amy Bauernschmidt became the first woman recommended by the Navy for command of a U.S. aircraft carrier.
- Stephanie Fahl, Ikea Kaufman, and Stephanie Jordi became the first women to graduate from a gender-integrated drill instructor course at Marine Corps Recruit Depot San Diego.
- Dana Capaldi became the first reservist and first female command chief for the 379th Air Expeditionary Wing of the Air Force.
- Sarah Field became the Idaho Army National Guard's first certified female 19D cavalry scout instructor at the 1st Battalion, 204th Regional Training Institute (Armor) at Gowen Field, Boise, Idaho.
- Jane M. Ramey became the first female Field Artillery Officer to command an FA battery in the Florida Army National Guard by assuming command of B/3-116th Field Artillery Battalion.
- Aria Dang became the first woman instructor in the Marines Field Artillery Basic Officers Leaders Course at Fort Sill.

== 2021 ==
- Wendy Johnson became the first female major general in the Nebraska National Guard.
- Susie S. Kuilan became the first woman to command Fort Sill's 95th Training Division.
- Dianna Wolfson became the first female commander of Norfolk Naval Shipyard.
- Jacinta Migo became the Air Force's first American Samoan woman promoted to the position of chief master sergeant.
- Women in the Air Force began to be allowed to wear their hair in "up to two braids or a single ponytail with bulk not exceeding the width of the head, and length not extending below a horizontal line running between the top of each sleeve inseam at the under arm through the shoulder blades" and have bangs that touch their eyebrows.
- New Army rules went into effect allowing

"No minimum hair length for female Soldiers
Multiple hairstyles to be worn at once (i.e. braiding twists or locs)
Ponytails for Soldiers unable to form a bun
Highlights (uniform blend of colors)
Optional wear of earrings in the Army Combat Uniform for Female Soldiers
Solid lip and nail colors (non-extreme) for female Soldiers".

- Haida StarEagle became the first female Native American Intelligence Officer to join the United States Space Force.
- Tonya Sims became the first black female Command Sgt. Major of the 82nd Airborne.
- The Virginia Military Institute named Kasey Meredith as its first female regimental commander.
- The first all-female platoon of Marines to train at Marine Corps Recruit Depot San Diego in California began training.
- For the first time ever, four women of color (Kimberly Jones, LaDonna Simpson, Kristel O'Cañas and Kathryn Wijnaldum) commanded American Navy warships at the same time.
- Erin Fagnan became the first woman from the South Dakota Army National Guard to graduate from the U.S. Army's Drill Sergeant Academy.
- Ulita Knight became the first woman assigned to the U.S. Army Human Resources Command to win the Best Warrior Competition.
- Mayra Hudgens became the first woman to earn the Navy's Steam Generating Plant Inspector certification.
- Amy Bauernschmidt became the first woman to command a U.S. Navy aircraft carrier, assuming command of USS Abraham Lincoln in August.
- Donna W. Martin became the first female Inspector General of the United States Army on September 2, 2021.
- An unnamed soldier became the first woman to graduate the U.S. Army sniper school.
- The Naval Special Warfare (NSW) training program graduated its first woman operator.
- Linda L. Fagan became the Coast Guard's first female four-star admiral.

== 2022 ==
- On 21 January 2022, Commander Billie J. Farrell was assigned to USS Constitution for a two-year assignment as the first woman commanding officer in the ship's 224-year history.
- In April Vanessa "Lana" Wilcox became the first female B-52 squadron commander in the Air Force when she took command of the 96th Bomb Squadron, 2nd Operations Group at Barksdale Air Force Base.
- The US Senate confirmed Linda L. Fagan as the 27th (and first female) Commandant of the Coast Guard on May 11, 2022. When she assumed command on June 1, she became the first female service chief in the US Armed Forces.
- The Army's annual regular fitness test was changed to allow women and older soldiers to pass with lower scores.
- Taylor Bye became the first female to receive the Koren Kolligian Jr. trophy, an Air Force award which "recognizes crew members who avert or minimize the seriousness of injury or property damage in an aircraft mishap".
- Jami Shawley became the first female head of the Combined Joint Task Force-Horn of Africa.
- Celia Riffey became the first female winner of the Tennessee National Guard's annual Adjutant General Rifle Match.
- Mary MeleNaite Tufui Likio 'Fui' McCray, born in America, became the first female Tongan officer commissioned in the U.S. Navy.
- Tamatha J. Naftzinger became the first female active duty soldier to earn the Master Army Instructor Badge at the Ordnance School.
- Catherine L. Cherry became the first female commander of the Army National Guard Bureau's Lavern E. Weber Professional Education Center.
- A woman whose name was not publicly announced became the Air Force's first female special tactics officer.
- Amanda Lee was announced as the first woman to serve as a demonstration pilot in the Blue Angels.
- Jenna Carson became the first female military chaplain endorsed by The Church of Jesus Christ of Latter-day Saints.
- Lena Kaman became the first female commanding officer at Naval Air Station Joint Reserve Base (NAS JRB) New Orleans.
- Sonya Morrison became the first female commander of the Iowa Air National Guard's 185th Air Refueling Wing in Sioux City.
- Zathlyn Rodriguez became the first female Chief Master Sergeant in the Virgin Islands Air National Guard's 285th Civil Engineering Squadron.
- Jessica J. O'Brien became the first female commanding officer of the Naval Weapons Station Seal Beach.
- Capt. Elizabeth Somerville became the first woman to take command of the Naval Test Wing Atlantic.
- Kayce Clark became the first female to be promoted to chief warrant officer 5 in the Utah Army National Guard.
- Angela Koogler became the first female chief of the boat in the history of the Navy when she joined the crew of USS Louisiana (Gold) (SSBN 743) on the 22nd of August.
- Kelsey Flannery, the first female F-35 pilot in the Air National Guard, flew her first flight as part of the Vermont Air National Guard.
- Jessica Padoemthontaweekij became the first female officer of the United States Air Force sent to participate in the Royal Thai Air Force Air Command and Staff College.
- Kristen E. Westby became the first female commander of the 122nd Fighter Wing (FW) Maintenance Group.
- Kelsey M. Hastings became the first woman to command the Marines' Silent Drill Platoon.
- Amber Cowan became the first female executive officer aboard any U.S. submarine; she did so for the Ohio-class ballistic missile submarine USS Kentucky.
- Lorna Mahlock received her second star and became the first black female Major General in the US Marine Corps.
- Joanna Nunan became the first female superintendent of the United States Merchant Marine Academy.
- Elizabeth Cox became the first female Army National Guard Soldier to graduate from the Army National Guard Warrior Training Center's M1 Abrams Master Gunner course, making her the first female Army Guard M1 Abrams Tank Master Gunner.

== 2023 ==
- Patricia R. Wallace became the first woman to lead the U.S. Army's 80th Training Command.
- Sonja Williams became the first woman senior enlisted leader for the 174th Attack Wing.
- Tracey Poirier was promoted to brigadier general in 2023, making her the first female member of the Vermont Army National Guard to attain general officer's rank.

== 2024 ==
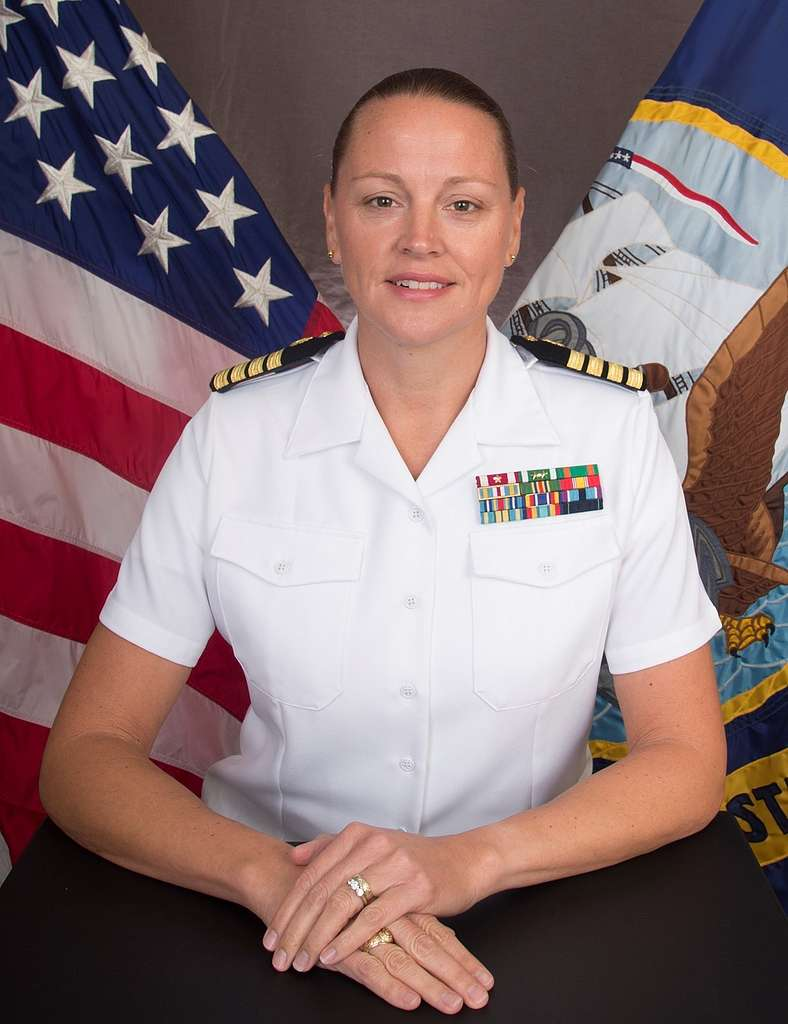
CAPT Anja Dabelić, United States Navy

- Anja Dabelić became the first female commander of Naval Medical Center Camp Lejeune.
- Candice D. Creecy became the first female ANGLICO commander, as the commander of the 6th Air Naval Gunfire Liaison Company.
- Second Lt. Khady Ndiaye was commissioned as the first female Muslim Chaplain in the Army.
- Capt. Annalisa Sanfilippo became the first female fighter pilot in the 144th Fighter Wing.
- Vanessa Espinoza became the first female active-duty fire chief in the Air Force.
- Molly Murphy became the first female Army nurse to graduate from Ranger School.
- Erin Eike became the first female Commander of U.S. Army Garrison – Redstone Arsenal.
- Dani Williams became the first female brigade commander of the 100th Missile Defense Brigade in the Colorado Army National Guard.
- Yolanda Gore was appointed as Fort Meade's first female Garrison Commander.
- The USS New Jersey, the first submarine designed for the complete integration of female and male sailors, was commissioned into the Navy's Submarine Force.
- Pia Romero became the first female brigadier general in the New Mexico Army National Guard.
- Zeita Merchant became the first African-American woman to be appointed rear admiral lower half in U.S. Coast Guard history

== See also ==
- American women in World War I
- American women in World War II
- Timeline of women in war in the United States, pre-1945
- Timeline of women in warfare in the United States from 1900 to 1949
- Timeline of women in warfare in the United States from 1950 to 1999
- Timeline of women in warfare and the military in the United States, 2000–2010
- Women in warfare and the military (2000–present) (international)
