= Sherri Gallagher =

American soldier

Sherri Jo Gallagher
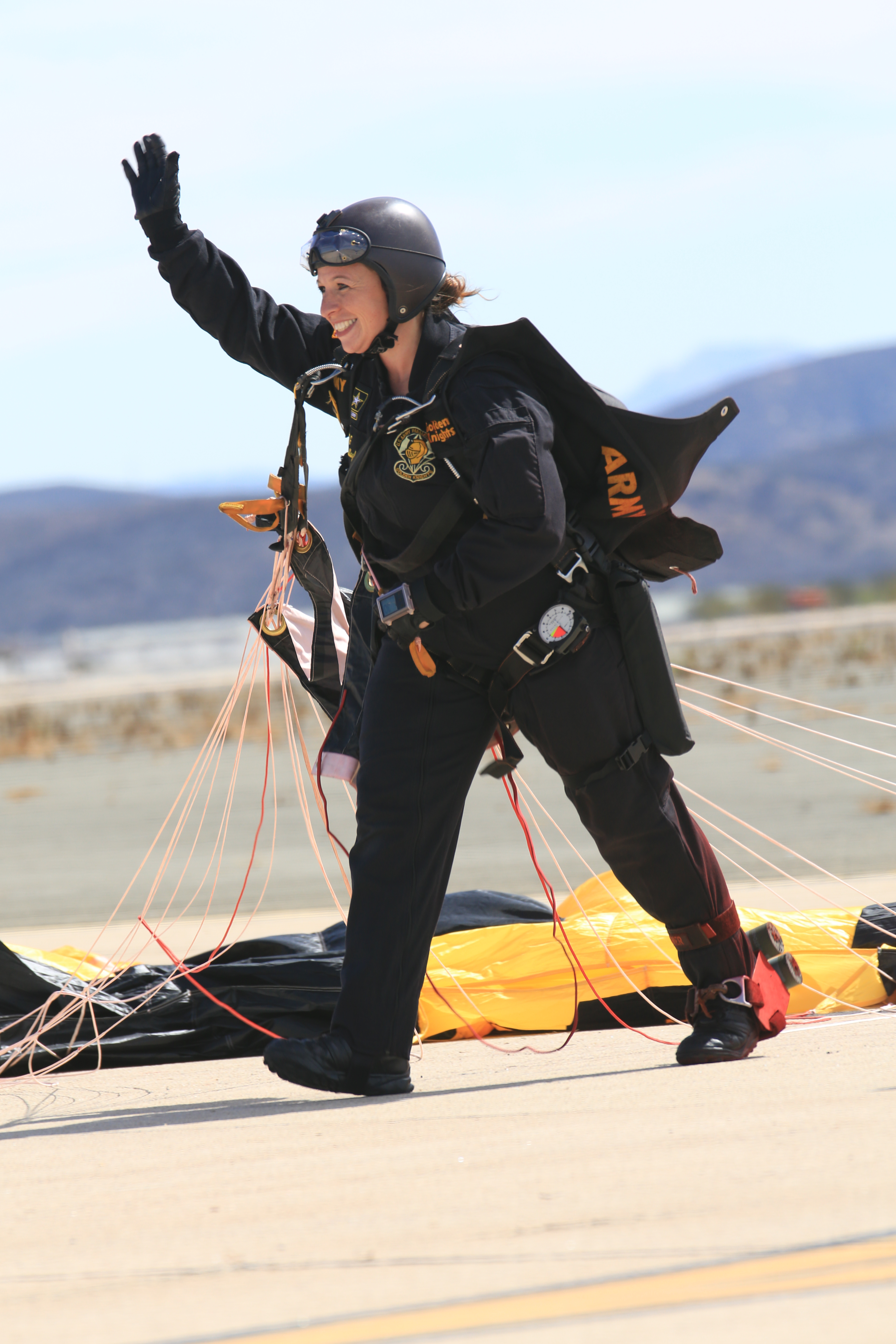
- Born: 1983 (age 42–43)
- Military career
- Allegiance: United States of America
- Branch: United States Army
- Rank: Sergeant
- Units: U.S. Army Marksmanship Unit, U.S. Army Golden Knights Parachute Team
- Awards: United States Army Soldier of the Year (2010)

Sgt. Sherri Jo Gallagher is an American soldier who holds 22 United States national rifle records. In 2010, she was named the U.S. Army Soldier of the Year.

== Early life and marksmanship training ==
Sherri Gallagher was born in 1984 in California USA. Her mother is Nancy Tompkins who in 1998 was the first woman to win the High Power Rifle Championship, and her step-father is Mid Tompkins, who has won the honor six times in a row. Gallagher was able to shoot a rifle for the first time at the age of five years. Her step-cousin half removed, Patrick Kelly, is a clay pigeon shooter.

In 2003, Gallagher was the World Long Range Shooting Champion, and had already been named National Rifle Champion twice by the National Rifle Association. Following her awards, Gallagher was invited to guest jump with the U.S. Army's Golden Knights Parachute Team. Following the jump, the team invited Gallagher to enlist.

== Military career ==
In 2010, Gallagher was nominated for Soldier of the Quarter based on her marksmanship, and traveled to Fort Lee, Virginia to compete for Soldier of the Year. Gallagher went on to compete nationally and was the first woman to win the U.S. Army's Soldier of the Year award.

In August 2010, Gallagher was the second woman to win the NRA's National High Power Rifle Championship. The first woman in history had been her mother. Of the twelve awards available at the 2010 NRA Championships, Gallagher was given eight.

In October 2010, Gallagher studied at the Airborne School in Fort Benning, Georgia, and took the Warriors Leaders Course.

In 2013, Gallagher was profiled by Business Insider as one of the "Most Impressive Women in the U.S. Military".

As of July 2014, Gallagher is stationed in Arizona.
