= Margaret C. Wilmoth =

American nurse, academic, and military officer

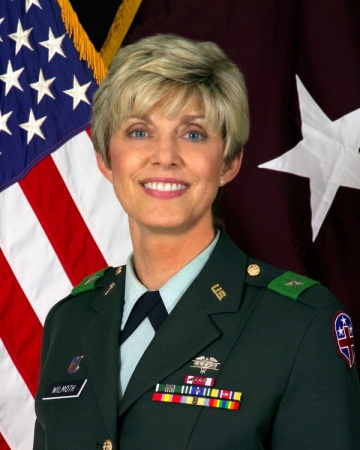
- Brigadier General Margaret C. Wilmoth
- Military career
- Allegiance: United States
- Branch: United States Army Reserve
- Rank: Major General
- Nickname: Peggy
- Commands: 332nd Medical Brigade; 5th Medical Group; 312th Field Hospital
- Awards: Army Distinguished Service Medal; Defense Superior Service Medal; Legion of Merit (2)

Margaret C. "Peggy" Wilmoth is a nursing professional, academic and a retired senior officer of the United States Army Reserve. She is Executive Dean, Associate Dean of Academic Affairs at the University of North Carolina School of Nursing. She was previously the inaugural Dean and Professor at the Byrdine F. Lewis School of Nursing and Health Professions at Georgia State University. She was promoted to brigadier general in 2005, becoming the first nurse and first woman to command a medical brigade as a general officer, and later attained the rank of major general.

== Education and nursing career ==
Wilmoth received both her Bachelor of Science in Nursing and Masters of Science in Nursing degrees from University of Maryland, her Doctor of Philosophy from the University of Pennsylvania, and her master's degree in strategic studies from the United States Army War College.

Wilmoth was Professor of Nursing at UNC Charlotte as well as the Assistant for Mobilization and Reserve Affairs for the Office of the Assistant Secretary of Defense for Health Affairs.

Wilmoth is a Fellow of the American Academy of Nursing and a Health Policy Fellow alumni of the Robert Wood Johnson Foundation. She is also a member of the Order of Military Medical Merit.

In March 2020, Wilmoth was inducted into the United States Army Women's Foundation Hall of Fame.
