= Ramona M. Valdez =

United States Marine (1984–2005)

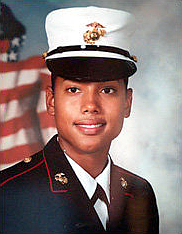
- Valdez in 2002
- Born: June 26, 1984; Dominican Republic
- Died: June 23, 2005 (aged 20); Fallujah, Iraq
- Spouse: Armando Guzman (husband)
- Relatives: Elida Nuñez (mother); Louis Valdez (father); Estefani Valdez (sister); Fiorela Valdez (sister)
- Military career
- Allegiance: United States of America
- Branch: United States Marine Corps
- Service years: 2002–2005
- Rank: Corporal
- Units: Headquarters Battalion, 2nd Marine Division, II Marine Expeditionary Force
- Conflicts: Iraq War: Operation Iraqi Freedom †
- Awards: Purple Heart; National Defense Service Medal; Global War on Terrorism Service Medal; Iraq Campaign Medal

Ramona M. Valdez (June 26, 1984 – June 23, 2005) was a Dominican-born United States Marine who was killed in the Iraq War. She was posthumously honored by the U.S. Marine Corps when the II MEF Communications Training Center was dedicated as the Valdez Training Facility.

== Early life and education ==
Valdez's mother, Elida Nuñez moved to New York City from the Dominican Republic and raised her two daughters, Ramona and Fiorela Valdez, on her own in the Bronx. There the Valdez sisters received their primary and secondary education. Ramona Valdez started to earn money to help her family at a young age. She was only 14 years old when she worked for the first time selling concessions at the Statue of Liberty.

Valdez graduated from Jane Addams High School when she was 15 years old. She attended a community college, however, she decided to join the U.S. Marine Corps to help her family economically and when she was 17, she convinced her mother to co-sign her enlistment papers.

== Career ==
Valdez, received her basic training at Marine Corps Recruit Depot Parris Island, South Carolina. After she graduated from her recruit training, she was sent to Marine Corps Base Camp Lejeune, North Carolina where she became a communications specialist. There she met Corporal Armando Guzman who in 2003 became her husband. Valdez was assigned to the Counter Improvised Explosive Device Working Group of the 2nd Marine Division. Her knowledge of single-channel radios contributed to the success of the tests conducted by CIEDWG.

=== Iraq War ===
Valdez was deployed to Iraq as a member of Headquarters Battalion, 2nd Marine Division, II Marine Expeditionary Force, in support of Operation Iraqi Freedom. Valdez wanted her mother to move to Reading, Pennsylvania from the Bronx, because she believed that Reading would have less noise and crime. She had even filled out application forms to become a highway patrol officer in Pennsylvania upon her discharge from the Marines.

On June 23, 2005, Valdez was serving with the Female Search Force where she helped guard checkpoints and search Iraqi women and children. Her convoy was on its way back to Camp Fallujah when a suicide bomber in a car, veered across a road and swerved directly into the convoy, causing a massive explosion that killed Valdez and two other women and three men, severely burning seven other women. When she was killed, she was three days short of her 21st birthday.

Valdez was buried with full military honors. She is survived by her husband Armando Guzman, her mother Elida Nuñez, father Ramon Valdez, younger sisters Fiorela Valdez, Estefani Valdez, Chavely Valdez and two nephews Justin and Joshua.

== Legacy ==
On June 1, 2007, the U.S. Marine Corps honored the memory of Valdez by dedicating the II MEF Communications Training Center as the Valdez Training Facility during a building dedication ceremony. The building has a plaque with Valdez's name inscribed. During the ceremony Colonel John A. Del Colliano, the division chief for network plans and policy for Command, Control, Communications and Computers, Headquarters Marine Corps, stated:

Her legacy will live on here for years to come ... Her name will be associated at a crossroads for communications in the Marine Corps.

— Colonel John A. Del Colliano, USMC, June 1, 2007

== Gallery ==
Corporal Ramona M. Valdez, USMC
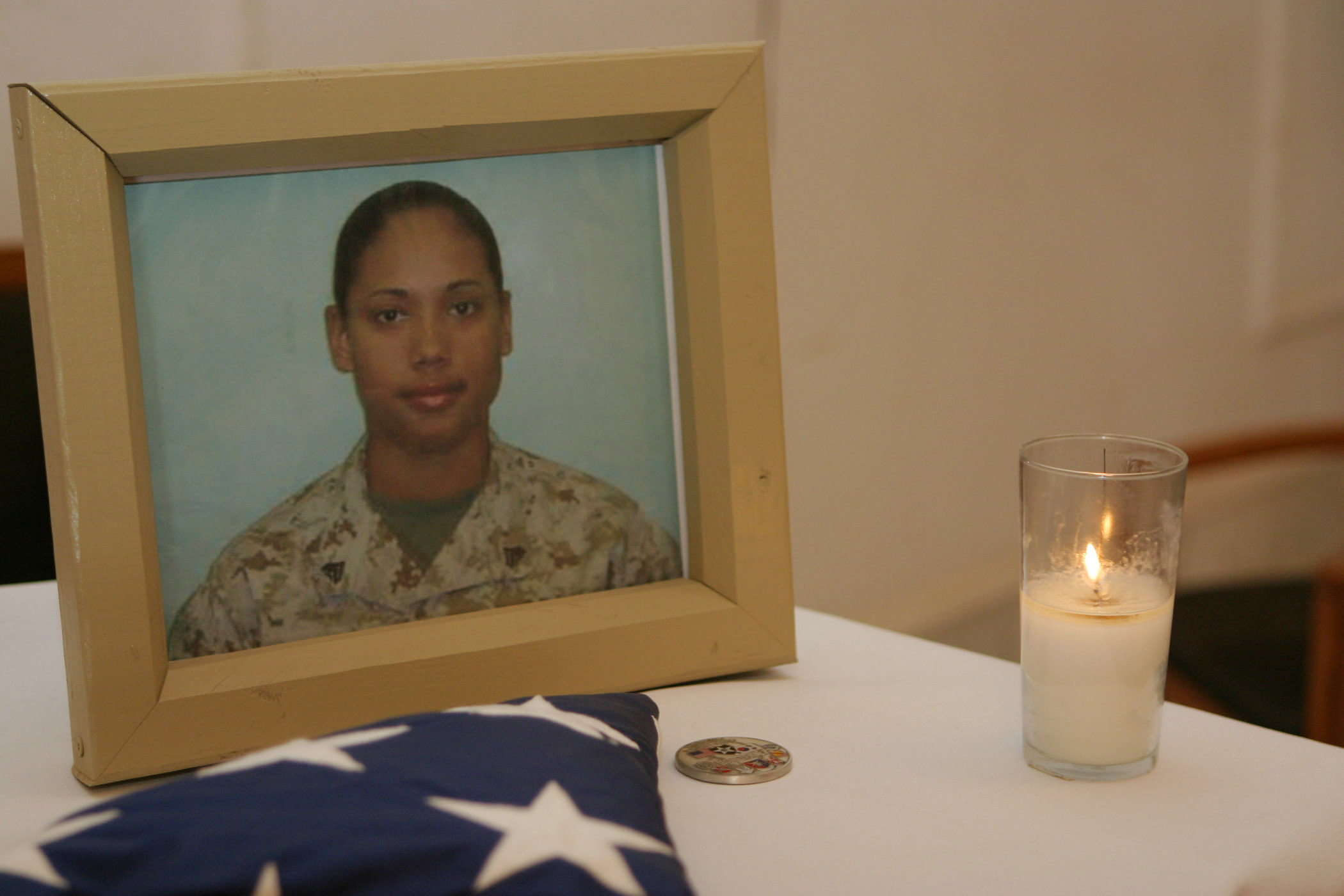
A photograph of Valdez at a memorial service in June 2005.

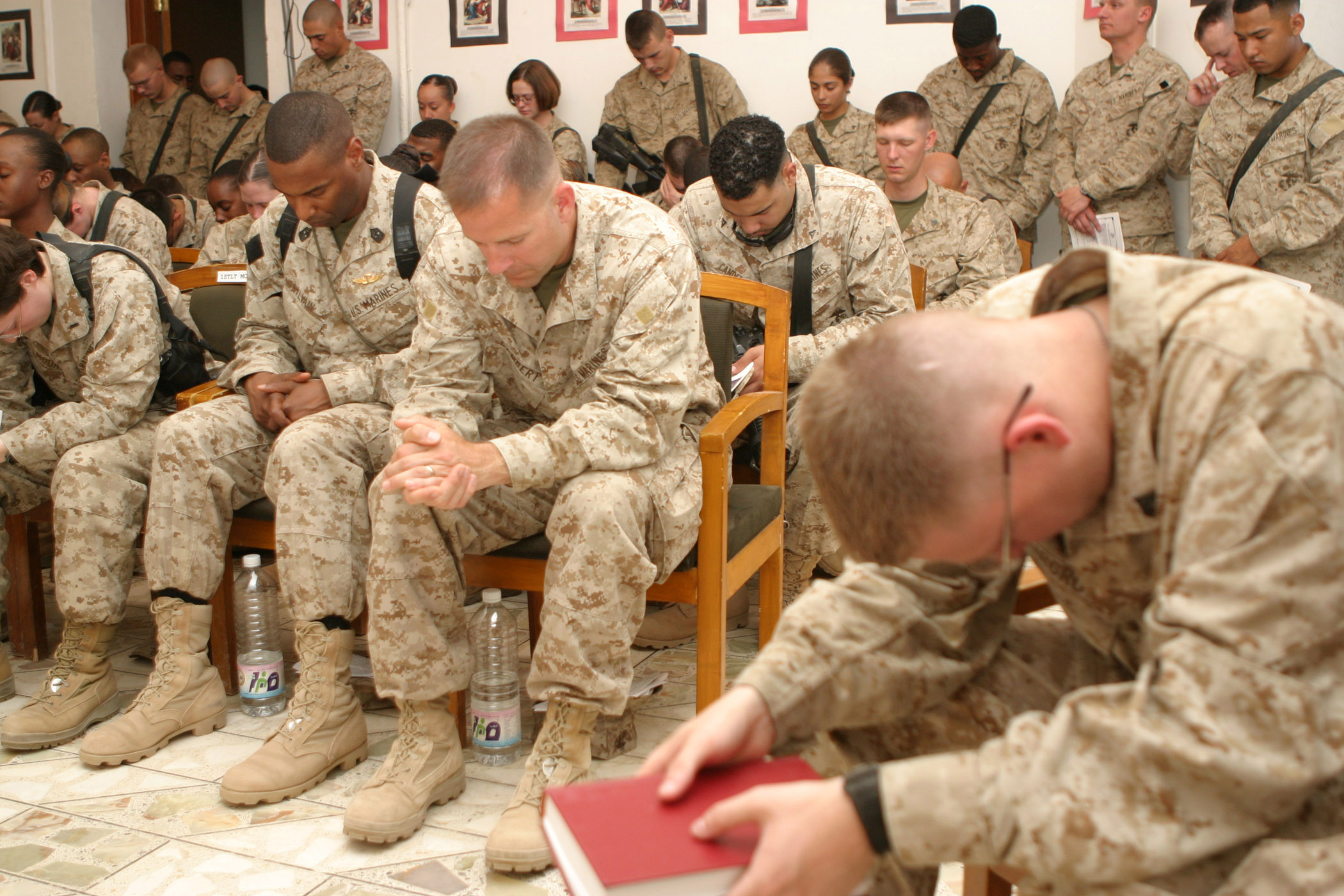
U.S. Marines observe a moment of silence at a memorial service to Valdez in June 2005.

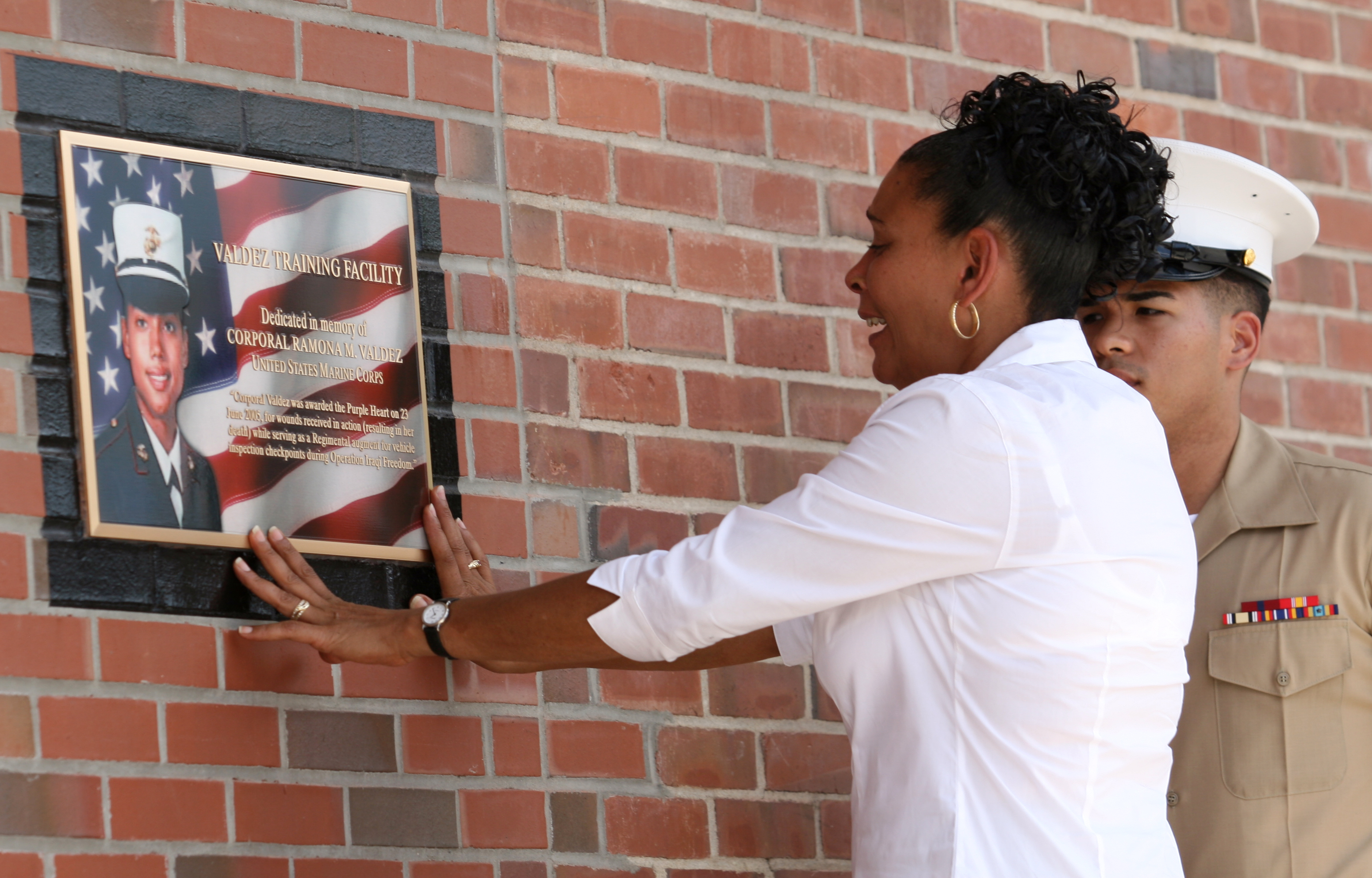
Elida Nunez examines a memorial plaque to her daughter in June 2007.

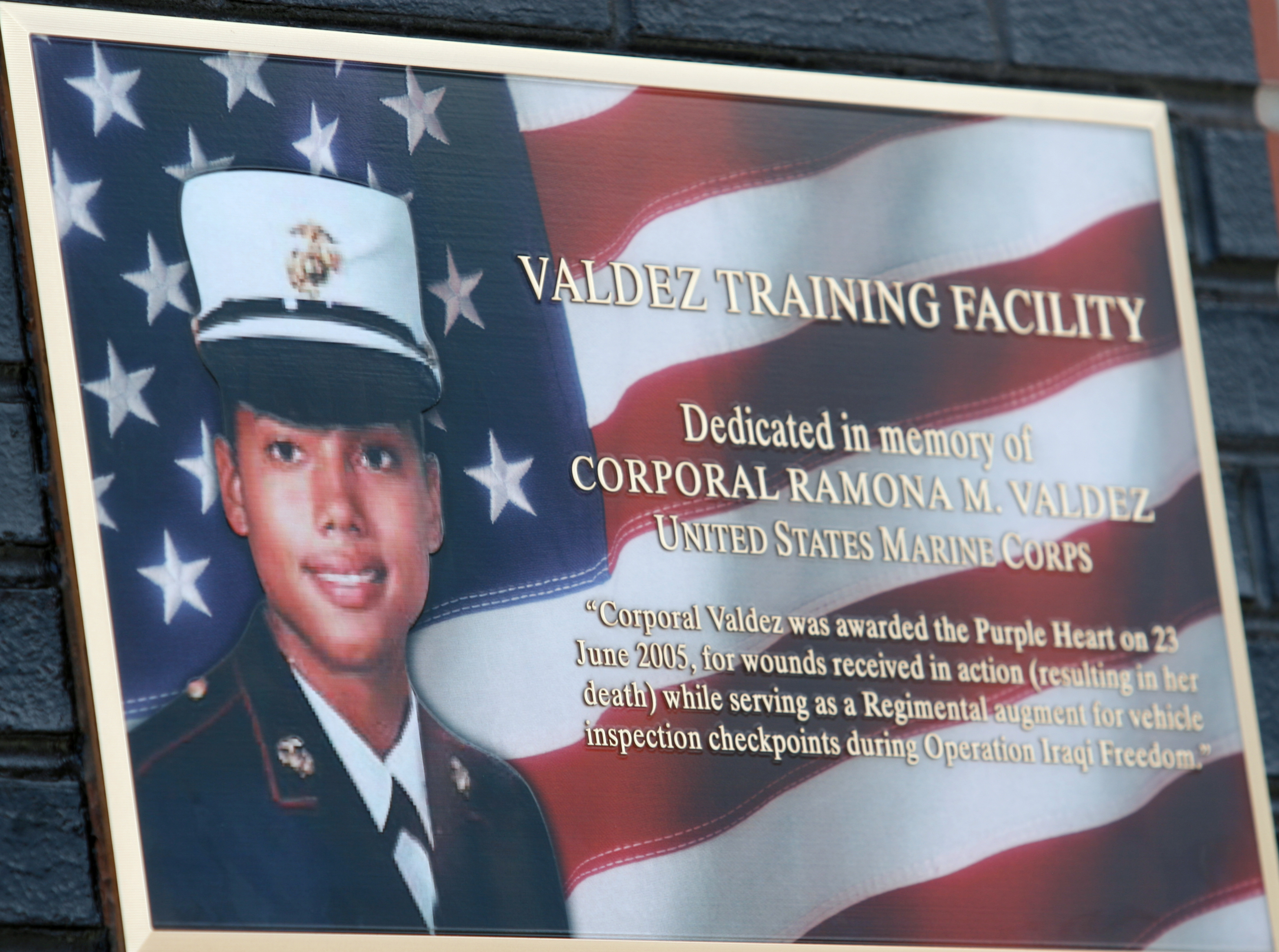
A memorial plaque to Valdez in June 2007.

== Awards and decorations ==

1st row		Purple Heart	
2nd row	National Defense Service Medal	Global War on Terrorism Service Medal	Iraq Campaign Medal

== See also ==
- Hispanics in the United States Marine Corps
