= Timeline of women in warfare in the United States from 1900 to 1949 =

This is a timeline of women in warfare in the United States from 1900 until 1949.

== 1900s ==
- 1901: The United States establishes the Army Nurse Corps as a permanent part of the Army. The Corps remains all-female until 1955.
- 1908: The United States establishes the Navy Nurse Corps on 13 May. The Corps remains all-female until 1965. The first 20 nurses (the first women in the Navy) report to Washington, D.C. in October 1908. By the end of World War I, their numbers increase to 1,386. During the war, the nurses serve on transport duty overseas in England, Ireland, and Scotland.

== 1910s ==
- 1913: U.S. Navy nurses (all women) serve on the transports USS Mayflower and USS Dolphin.
- World War I:

During the course of the war, 21,498 U.S. Army nurses (American military nurses were all women then) served in military hospitals in the United States and overseas. Many of these women were positioned near to battlefields, and they tended to over a million soldiers who had been wounded or were unwell. 272 U.S. Army nurses died of disease (mainly tuberculosis, influenza, and pneumonia). In 1917 U.S. Army nurses Clara Ayres and Helen Wood became the first female members of the U.S. military killed in the line of duty. They were killed on May 20, 1917, while with Base Hospital #12 aboard USS Mongolia en route to France. The ship's crew fired the deck guns during a practice drill, and one of the guns exploded, spewing shell fragments across the deck and killing Nurses Ayres and Wood. Eighteen African-American Army nurses served stateside caring for German prisoners of war (POWs) and African-American soldiers. They were assigned to Camp Grant, IL, and Camp Sherman, OH, and lived in segregated quarters.

Hello Girls was the colloquial name for American female switchboard operators in World War I, formally known as the Signal Corps Female Telephone Operators Unit. During World War I, these switchboard operators were sworn into the Army Signal Corps. This corps was formed in 1917 from a call by General John J. Pershing to improve the worsening state of communications on the Western front. Applicants for the Signal Corps Female Telephone Operators Unit had to be bilingual in English and French to ensure that orders would be heard by anyone. Over 7,000 women applied, but only 450 women were accepted. Many of these women were former switchboard operators or employees at telecommunications companies. Despite the fact that they wore Army Uniforms and were subject to Army Regulations (and Chief Operator Grace Banker received the Distinguished Service Medal), they were not given honorable discharges but were considered "civilians" employed by the military, because Army Regulations specified the male gender. Not until 1978, the 60th anniversary of the end of World War I, did Congress approve veteran status and honorable discharges for the remaining women who had served in the Signal Corps Female Telephone Operators Unit.

The first American women enlisted into the regular armed forces were 13,000 women admitted into active duty in the U.S. Navy during the war. They served stateside in jobs and received the same benefits and responsibilities as men, including identical pay (US$28.75 per month), and were treated as veterans after the war.

The U.S. Marine Corps enlisted 305 female Marine Reservists (F) to "free men to fight" by filling positions such as clerks and telephone operators on the home front.

In January 1918, Myrtle Hazard enlisted in the Coast Guard, served as a telegraph operator, and was discharged as an Electrician 1st Class. She was the only woman to serve in the Coast Guard during the war and she is the namesake of USCGC Myrtle Hazard. Wartime newspapers erroneously reported that twin sisters Genevieve and Lucille Baker were the first women to serve in the Coast Guard. While they tried to enlist, they were not accepted.

These women were demobilized when hostilities ceased, and aside from the Nurse Corps the uniformed military became once again exclusively male. In 1942, women were brought into the military again, largely following the British model.

== 1920s ==
- 1920: The Army Reorganization Act grants Army nurses relative rank, with their relative standing in the army corresponding to the standing of commissioned officers, although the nurses themselves are not commissioned officers. The “assimilated ranks” of major, lieutenant, and captain are authorized. Staff nurses are appointed as second lieutenants, the superintendent is appointed as a major, the assistant superintendent and directors are captains, and chief nurses are first lieutenants. The nurses are also authorized to wear insignia by the Act.

== 1930s ==
- 1938: The (U.S.) Naval Reserve Act permits the enlistment of qualified women as nurses.

== 1940s ==
=== 1942 ===
- 1942: The Women's Reserve of the U. S. Coast Guard Reserve program (officially nicknamed the "SPARs"), was first established in 1942.
- 1942: YN3 Dorothy Tuttle became the first SPAR enlistee when she enlisted in the Coast Guard Women's Reserve on the 7th of December, 1942.
- 1942: The Marine Corps Women's Reserve (MCWR) was authorized by the U.S Congress in July 1942 to relieve male Marines for combat duty in World War II.
- 1942: U.S. President Franklin D. Roosevelt signed the Public Law 689 creating the Navy's women reserve program on 30 July 1942.
- 1942: The U.S. Women's Army Auxiliary Corps (WAAC) was founded.
- 1942: The name of the U.S. Women's Army Auxiliary Corps (WAAC) is officially changed to Women's Army Corps (WAC).

=== 1943 ===
- 1943: The U.S. Women's Army Corps recruited a unit of Chinese-American women to serve with the Army Air Forces as "Air WACs."

=== 1944 ===
- 1944: Public Law 238 granted full military rank to members of the U.S. Navy Nurse Corps, who were then all women.
- 1944: Aleda Lutz became the first American servicewoman to be killed in combat during World War II.
- 1944: On December 28, 1944, Aleda Lutz became the first military woman to receive the Distinguished Flying Cross, which she received posthumously.

=== 1945 ===
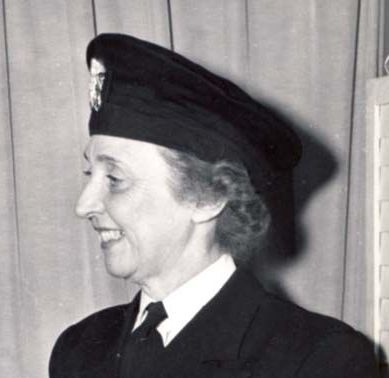
CAPT Nellie Jane DeWitt, USN

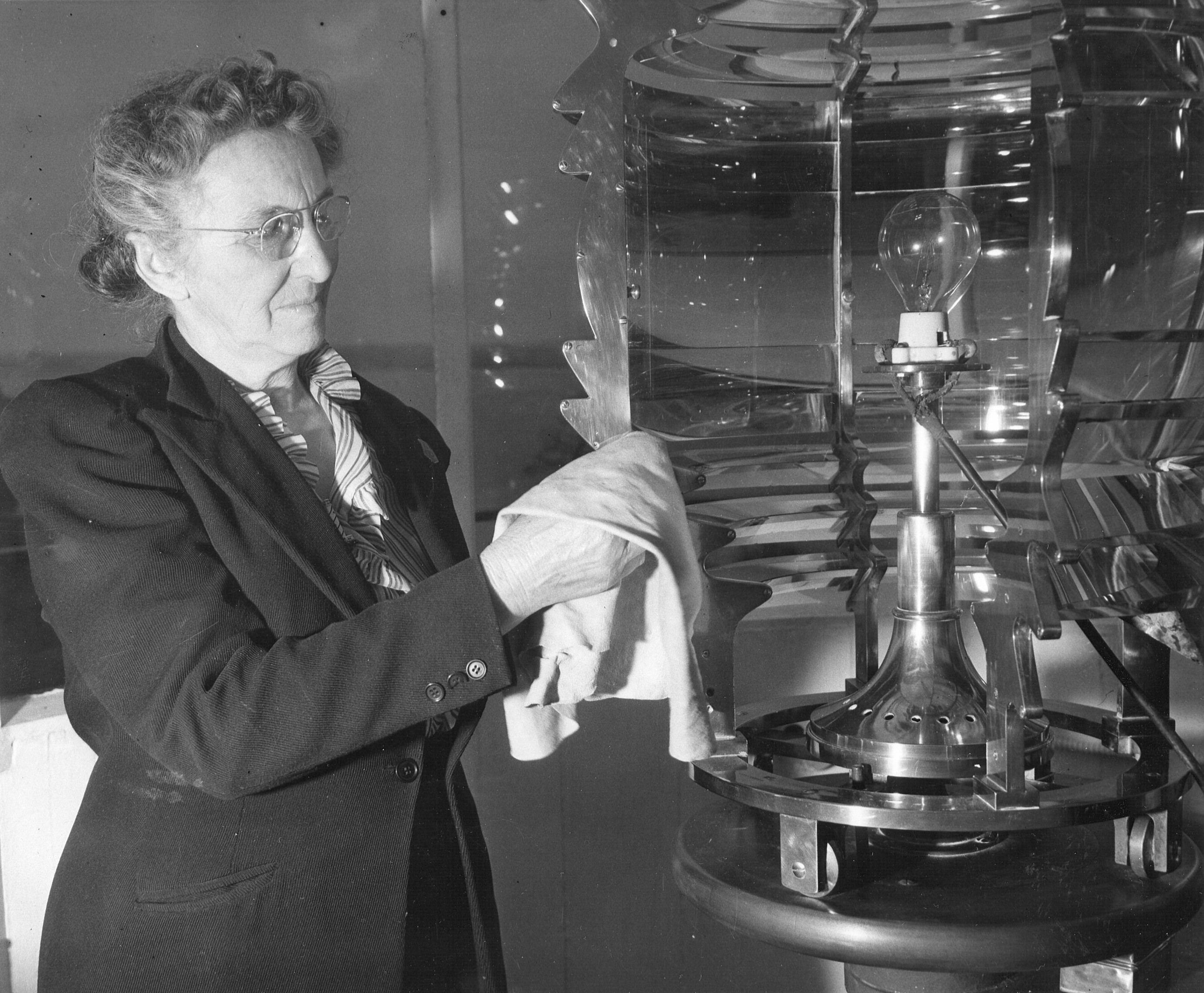
Fannie Salter, USCG

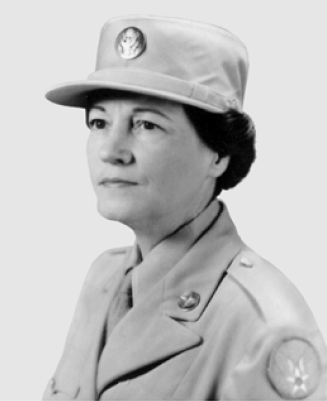
SSgt Esther Blake, USAF

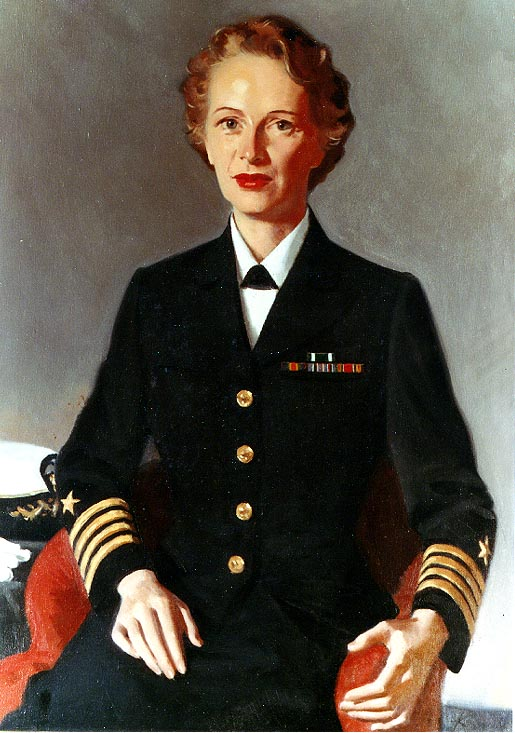
Captain Joy Bright Hancock, USN

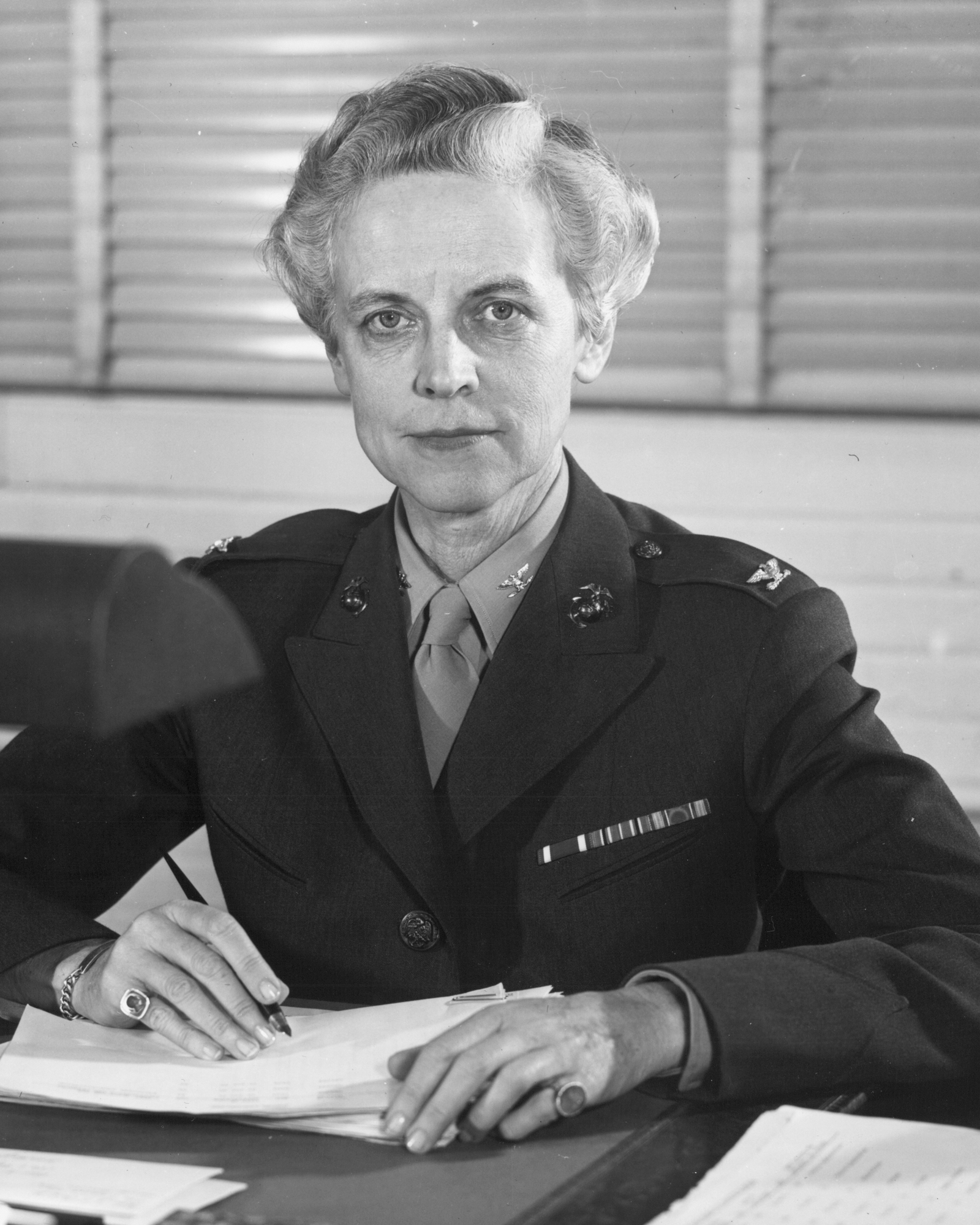
Colonel Katherine Amelia Towle, USMC

- The first African-American woman sworn into the Navy Nurse Corps was Phyllis Mae Dailey, a Columbia University student from New York, on March 8, 1945. She was the first of only four African-American women to serve as a Navy nurse during World War II.
- The first five African-American women entered the Coast Guard Women's Reserve (SPARs). Olivia Hooker was the very first African-American woman to enter the Coast Guard.
- 1945: SPAR Marjorie Bell Stewart was awarded the Silver Lifesaving Medal by CAPT Dorothy Stratton, becoming the first SPAR to receive the award.
- 1945: Jane Kendeigh became the first Navy flight nurse in an active combat zone, serving at Iwo Jima.
- 1945: Jane Kendeigh became the first flight nurse to arrive in Okinawa.
- 1945: Mildred H. McAfee became the first woman to receive the Navy Distinguished Service Medal.

=== 1946 ===
- Nellie Jane DeWitt becomes Superintendent/Director of the United States Navy Nurse Corps.

=== 1947 ===
- 25 July The SPARs was inactivated.
- Lotus Mort becomes the first female warrant officer in the U.S. Marine Corps.
- The Army-Navy Nurse Act of 1947 (Public Law 36-80C) creates the Army Nurse Corps and Women's Medical Specialist Corps into part of the Regular Army and Navy and ensures that all nurses are classed as commissioned officers.

=== 1948 ===
- 31 January: Turkey Point Lighthouse keeper, Fannie Salter, retired from active service and was the last woman to retire as a lighthouse keeper.
- March: Nancy Leftenant-Colon became the first African American in the regular United States Army Nurse Corps after it was desegregated.
- 12 June: President Harry Truman signed Public Law 625, (Pub. L. 80–625, 62 Stat. 356, enacted June 12, 1948), also known as the Women's Armed Services Integration Act, the law that enabled women to serve as permanent, regular members of the armed forces in the Navy, as well as the Army, Marine Corps, and the recently formed Air Force. Prior to this act, women, with the exception of nurses, served in the military only in times of war. During World War II, over 150,000 women had served in the WAVES (the Navy) and the Women's Auxiliary Army Corps and were still serving when the act was enacted. However, Section 502 of the act limited service of women by excluding them from aircraft and vessels of the Navy that might engage in combat.
- 7 July 1948: Six women became the first enlisted women to be sworn into in the regular Navy: Chief Yeoman Wilma J. Marchal, Hospital Corpsman First Class Ruth Flora, Aviation Storekeeper First Class Kay L. Langen, Yeoman Second Class Edna Young, Storekeeper Second Class Frances T. Devaney, and Teleman Doris R. Robertson. Edna Young was the only Black woman out of those six, and thus the first Black woman to be enlisted in the regular Navy.
- 8 July: Esther Blake became the first woman to enlist in the regular U.S. Air Force; she enlisted in the first minute of the first hour of the first day regular Air Force duty was authorized for women on July 8, 1948.
- October 15, 1948: The first eight women officers were commissioned in the regular Navy: Joy Bright Hancock, Winifred Quick Collins, Ann King, Frances Willoughby, Ellen Ford, Doris Cranmore, Doris Defenderfer, and Betty Rae Tennant took their oaths as naval officers.

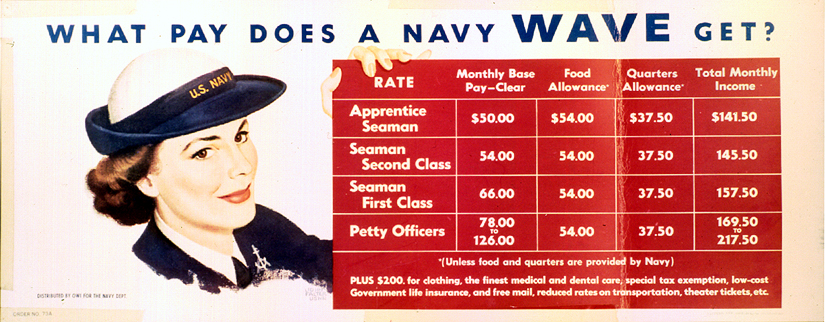
WAVES recruitment poster

- The position Assistant Chief of Naval Personnel for Women (ACNP(W)) was created from the original WAVES leadership position. This was the first notion of the Office of Women's Policy. The woman officer who held the position was an 0-6 for as long as she filled the billet. No flag rank was allowed per Title 10 USC 6015.
- Colonel Katherine A. Towle becomes the first Director of Women Marines.

=== 1949 ===
- On 6 January 1948, Edith DeVoe was transferred to the Navy Nurse Corps and assigned to the Navy Communication Annex Dispensary in Washington, D. C., which made her the first black nurse in the regular navy.
- The Women's Reserve of the Coast Guard Reserves (SPARs) is re-established by the President on 4 August 1949, and becomes effective on 1 November 1949.
- The U.S. Air Force Nurse Corps was established.
- The first African-American women enlisted in the U.S. Marine Corps.
- The U.S. Air Force Nurse Corps was established.

== See also ==
- American women in World War I
- American women in World War II
- Timeline of women in war in the United States, pre-1945
- Timeline of women in warfare in the United States from 1950 to 1999
- Timeline of women in warfare and the military in the United States, 2000–2010
- Timeline of women in warfare and the military in the United States, 2011–present
