= American women in World War II =

American women participating in WWII

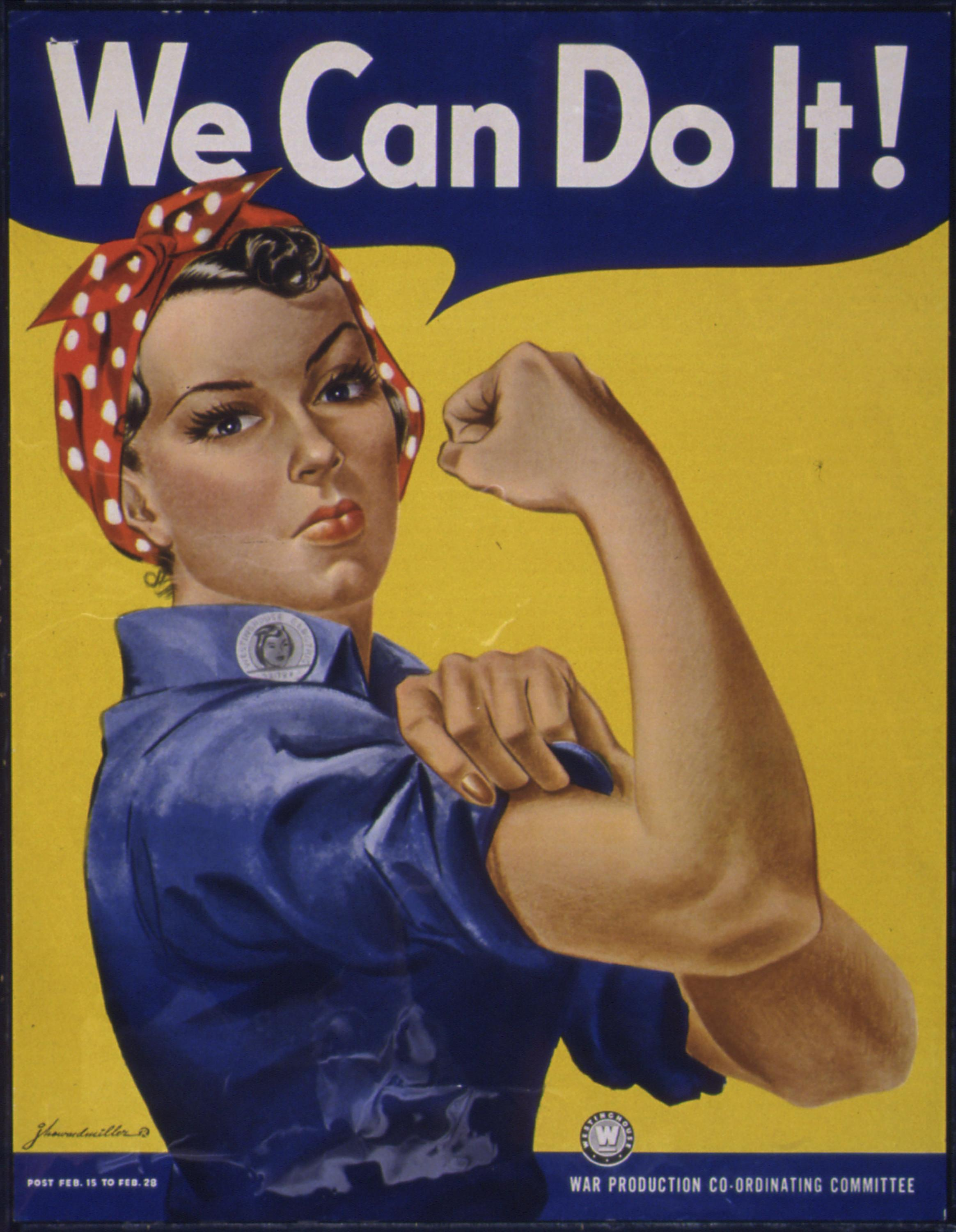
Rosie the Riveter (Westinghouse poster, 1942). The image became iconic in the 1980s.

American women in World War II became involved in many tasks they rarely had before; as the war involved global conflict on an unprecedented scale, the absolute urgency of mobilizing the entire population made the expansion of the role of women inevitable. Their services were recruited through a variety of methods, including posters and other print advertising, as well as popular songs. Among the most iconic images were those depicting "Rosie the Riveter", a woman factory laborer performing what was previously considered men's work.

With this added skill base channeled to paid employment opportunities, the presence of women in the American workforce continued to expand from what had occurred during World War I. Many sought and secured jobs in the war industry, building ships, aircraft, vehicles, and munitions or other weaponry. Others drove trucks, worked as mechanics and radio operators, as well as providing vital logistical support for the soldiers. Still, others worked on farms. Women also enlisted in significantly greater numbers in the military, some of whom served as nurses near the front lines.

During World War II, approximately 350,000 U.S. women served with the armed forces. As many as 543 died in war-related incidents, including 16 nurses who were killed from enemy fire - even though U.S. political and military leaders had decided not to use women in combat because they feared public opinion. By 1948, however, women were finally recognized as a permanent part of the U.S. armed forces with the passage of the Women's Armed Services Integration Act of 1948.

== Civilians aiding the military ==
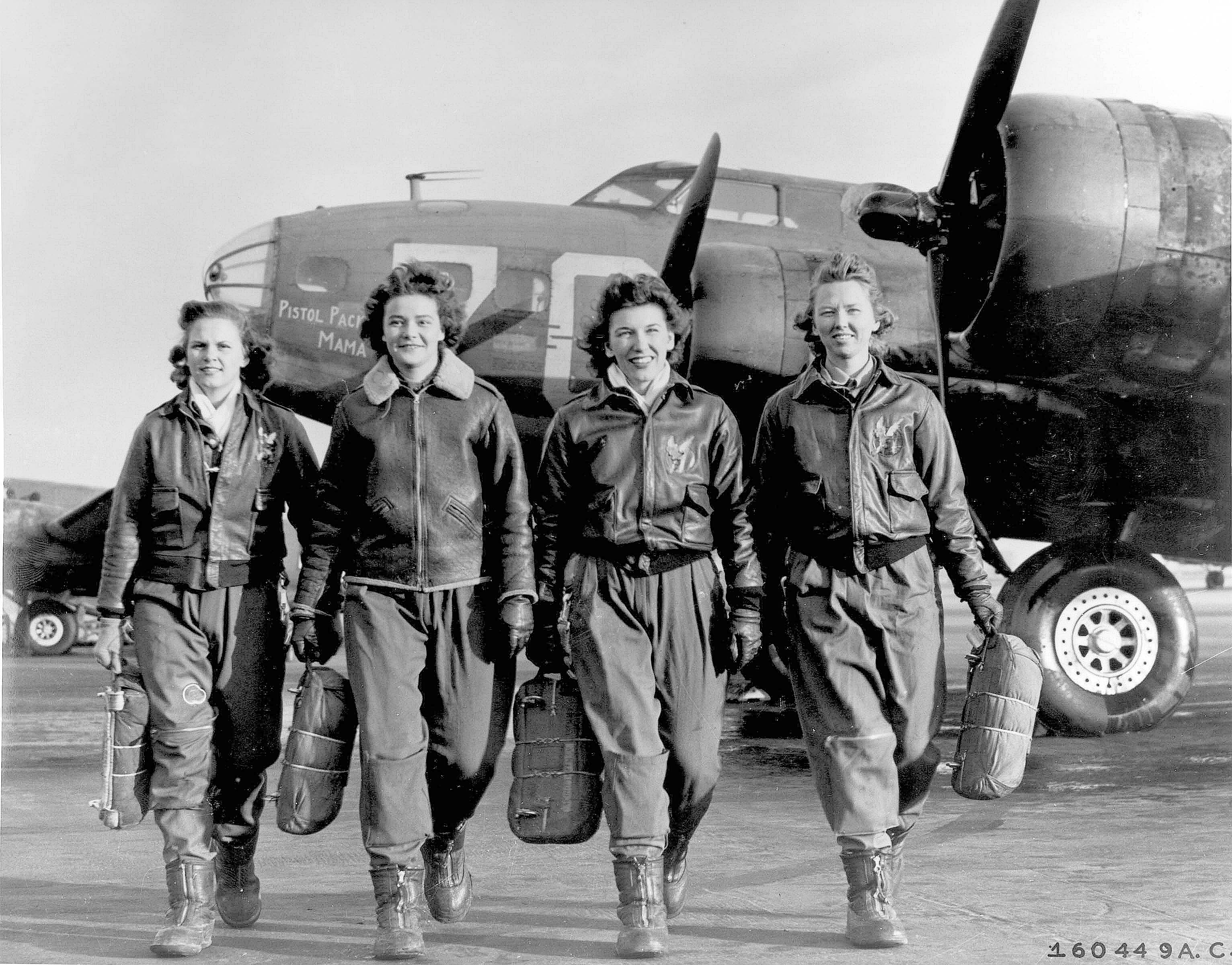
WASP pilots flew warplanes from factories to U.S. bases.

The Women Airforce Service Pilots (WASPs) were civilians who flew stateside missions, chiefly ferrying planes from one location to another when male pilots were needed for combat roles. In September 1942, General Henry H. Arnold agreed to form two units of women who would help fly aircraft in the United States. They were The Women's Auxiliary Ferry Squadron (WAFS), led by Nancy Harkness Love, and The Women's Flying Training Detachment (WFTD), led by Jacqueline Cochran. These two groups merged in 1943 to create WASP. More than 1,074 of these skilled pilots became the first women to fly American military aircraft, taking off from airfields at 126 bases across the United States to logistically relocate fifty percent of the combat aircraft during the war. The WASP was disbanded in 1944 when returning combat pilots took over ferrying tasks; 38 WASPs died in accidents. The WAP was granted veteran status in 1977, and given the Congressional Gold Medal in 2009. The Women's Air Raid Defense was a similar group that operated in Hawaii.

Women also served as spies for the Office of Strategic Services, a United States intelligence agency. Of the 4,500 women employed by the OSS as clerks, operations agents, codebreakers, and undercover agents (out of the 13,000 people employed in total by the OSS), 1,500 worked overseas. One, Portland, Oregon's Claire Phillips, an untrained spy, operated a clandestine ring under the cover of Club Tsubaki, a cabaret popular with Japanese officers stationed in Manila. Earning the nickname "high-pockets" because she smuggled information in her brassiere, she also funneled food, medicine, and other supplies to prisoners in the Philippines. Another, Elizabeth Thorpe Pack, used seduction to extract information, and was best known for helping to acquire the first Enigma machine from Polish intelligence and for securing Italian and Vichy French codebooks. Virginia Hall, who was labeled by the Gestapo as "the most dangerous of all alien spies", disguised herself as a milkmaid in France in order to spy on German forces.

In 2017, Sadie O. Horton, who spent World War II working aboard a U.S. Merchant Marine barge, posthumously received official veteran's status for her wartime service, becoming the first recorded female Merchant Marine veteran of World War II.

== Home front ==
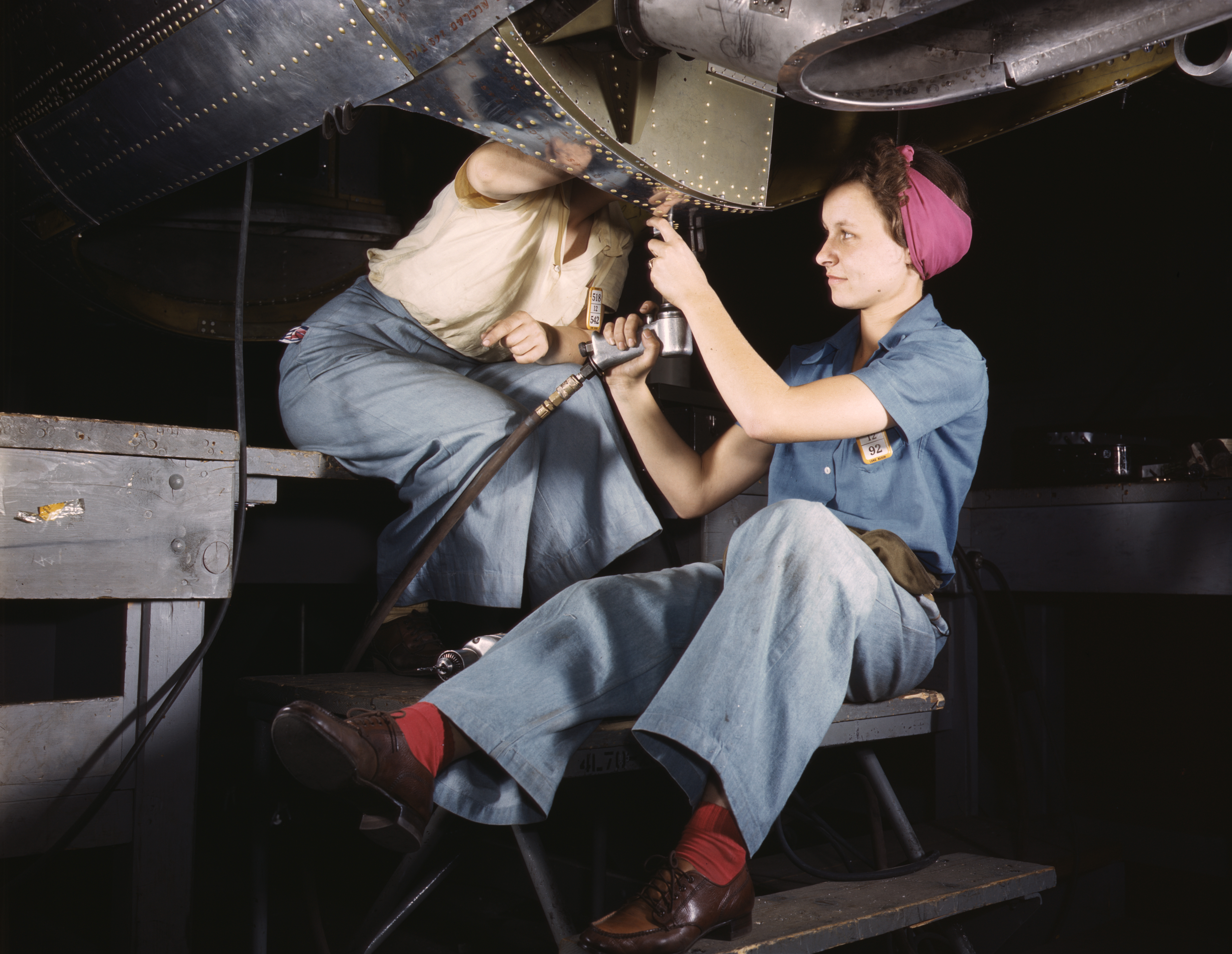
Female factory workers in 1942, Long Beach, California.

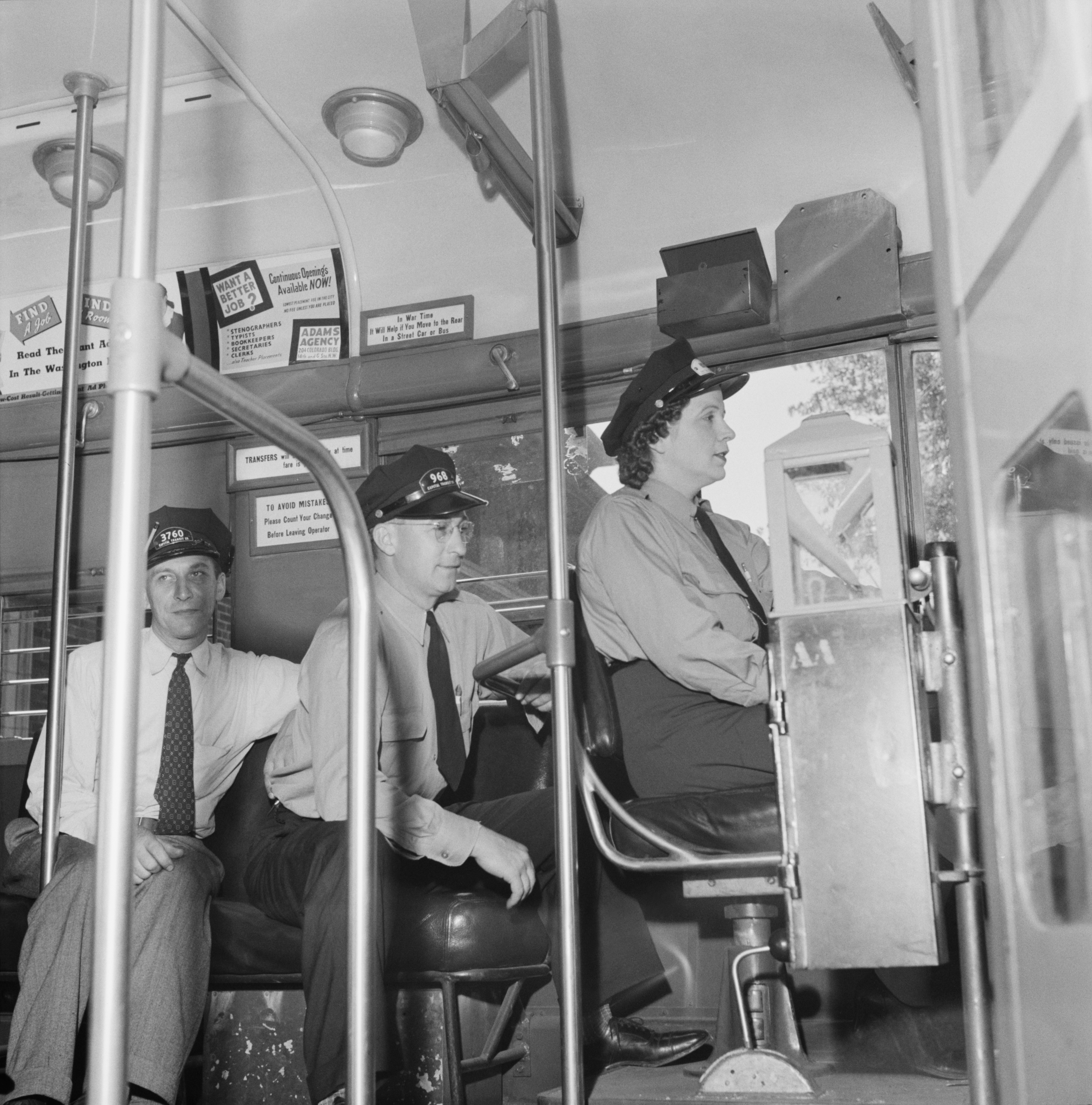
Esther Bubley's documentary photograph of a woman being taught to drive a streetcar for the Capitol Transit Company in Washington, D. C.

U.S. women also performed many kinds of non-military service in organizations such as the American Red Cross and the United Service Organizations (USO). Nineteen million American women filled out the home front labor force, not only as "Rosie the Riveters" in war factory jobs, but in transportation, agricultural, and office work of every variety. Women joined the federal government in massive numbers during World War II. Nearly a million "government girls" were recruited for war work. In addition, women volunteers aided the war effort by planting victory gardens, canning produce, selling war bonds, donating blood, salvaging needed commodities, and sending care packages.

By the end of World War I, twenty-four percent of workers in aviation plants, mainly located along the coasts of the United States were women, and yet this percentage was easily surpassed by the beginning of World War II. Mary Anderson, director of the Women's Bureau, reported in January 1943 that about 2,800,000 women "are now engaged in war work and that their numbers are expected to double by the end of this year."

The skills women had acquired through their daily chores proved to be very useful in helping them acquire new skill sets towards the war effort. Since men that usually did certain jobs were out at war, women tried to replace them. For example, the pop culture phenomenon of "Rosie the Riveter" made riveting one of the most widely known jobs. Experts speculate women were so successful at riveting because it so closely resembled sewing (assembling and seaming together a garment). However, riveting was only one of many jobs that women were learning and mastering as the aviation industry was developing. As Glenn Martin, a co-founder of Martin Marietta, told a reporter: "We have women helping design our planes in the Engineering Departments, building them on the production line, [and] operating almost every conceivable type of machinery, from rivet guns to giant stamp presses".

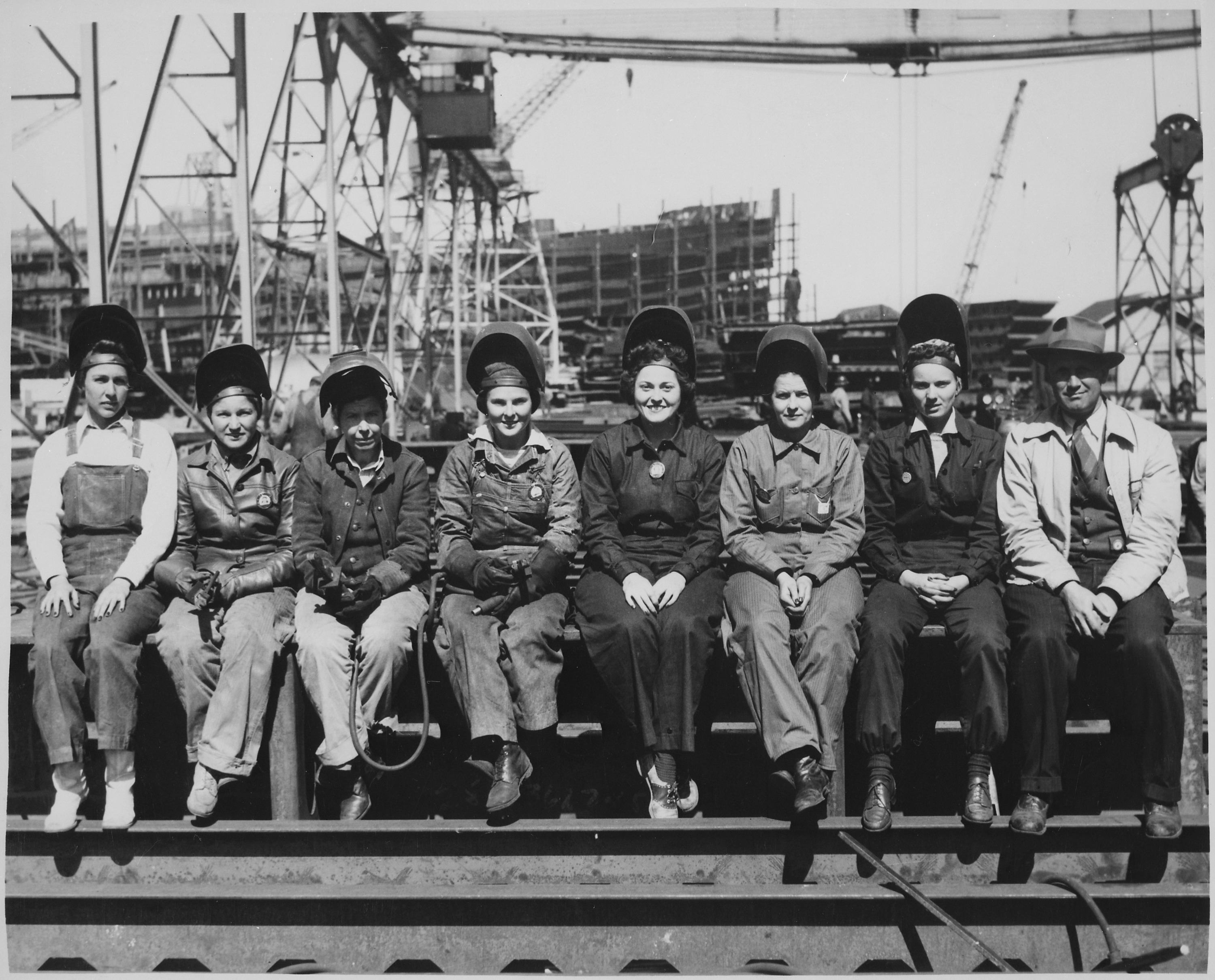
Female welders in Pascagoula, Mississippi, 1943

Some women indeed chose more traditional female jobs such as sewing aircraft upholstery or painting radium on tiny measurements so that pilots could see the instrument panel in the dark. And yet many others, maybe more adventurous, chose to run massive hydraulic presses that cut metal parts while others used cranes to move bulky plane parts from one end of the factory to the other. They even had women inspectors to ensure any necessary adjustments were made before the planes were flown out to war often by female pilots. The majority of the planes they built were either large bombers or small fighters.

Although most Americans were reluctant to allow women into traditionally male jobs, women proved that they could not only do the job but in some instances, they did it better than their male counterparts. For example, women in general paid more attention to detail. As the foreman of California Consolidated Aircraft once told the Saturday Evening Post, "Nothing gets by them unless it's right." The United States Department of Labor even states that when examining the number of holes drilled per day in the aircraft manufacturing industry, a man drilled 650 holes per day while a woman drilled 1,000 holes per day.

Two years after Pearl Harbor, some 475,000 women were working in aircraft factories - which, by comparison, was almost five times as many as ever joined the Women's Army Corps.

Other industries that women entered were the metal industry, steel industry, shipbuilding industry, and automobile industry. Women also worked in plants where bombs, weaponry, and aircraft were made.

=== Mothers in the workforce ===
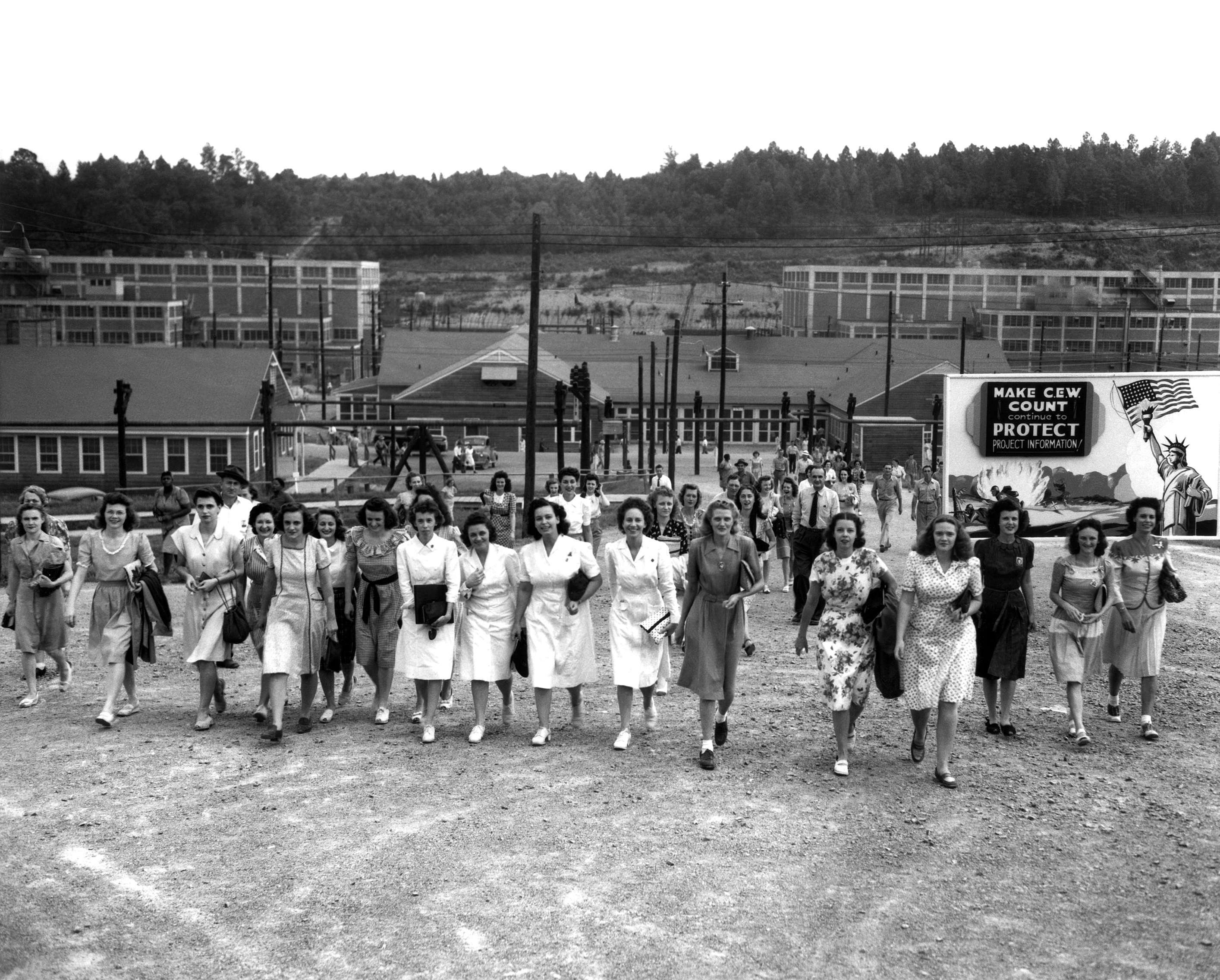
A shift change at the Y-12 Manhattan Project site, Oak Ridge, Tennessee, August 11, 1945

Many of the women called upon to fill the labor gap following the draft were mothers. They had to face the challenges of balancing both duties to the household as well as the need to contribute to the war effort. Despite some widespread disagreement, mothers began to seek out employment since they were financially vulnerable. Eventually, government encouragement and assistance with childcare saw more and more women entering the workforce.

The draft, which began in 1940, saw about ten million actually serve out of the fifty million that had initially registered. Initially, men classified as having dependents in their households, such as spouses and children (excluding common law spouses), were exempt from the draft. This left only 10% of men eligible to be drafted and go to war. By 1941, many exemptions were revoked, leaving many families without their primary breadwinners, and many employers had an urgent need for workers to fill their spots. Early on, popular media pushed back against mothers entering the workforce, reinforcing traditional gender roles. Despite negative attitudes, many mothers were compelled to join the workforce as the war progressed. Come 1943, with so many men deployed, mothers had little choice but to seek work to provide.

With the number of women entering the workforce growing, the government began encouraging employers to hire these women to fill any labor gaps that they needed. The War Manpower Commission, a government agency, was at the frontlines and was one of the main sources of encouragement to hire women and mothers. Between 1940 and 1944, the number of employed women rose by 50%, and married women by 76%.

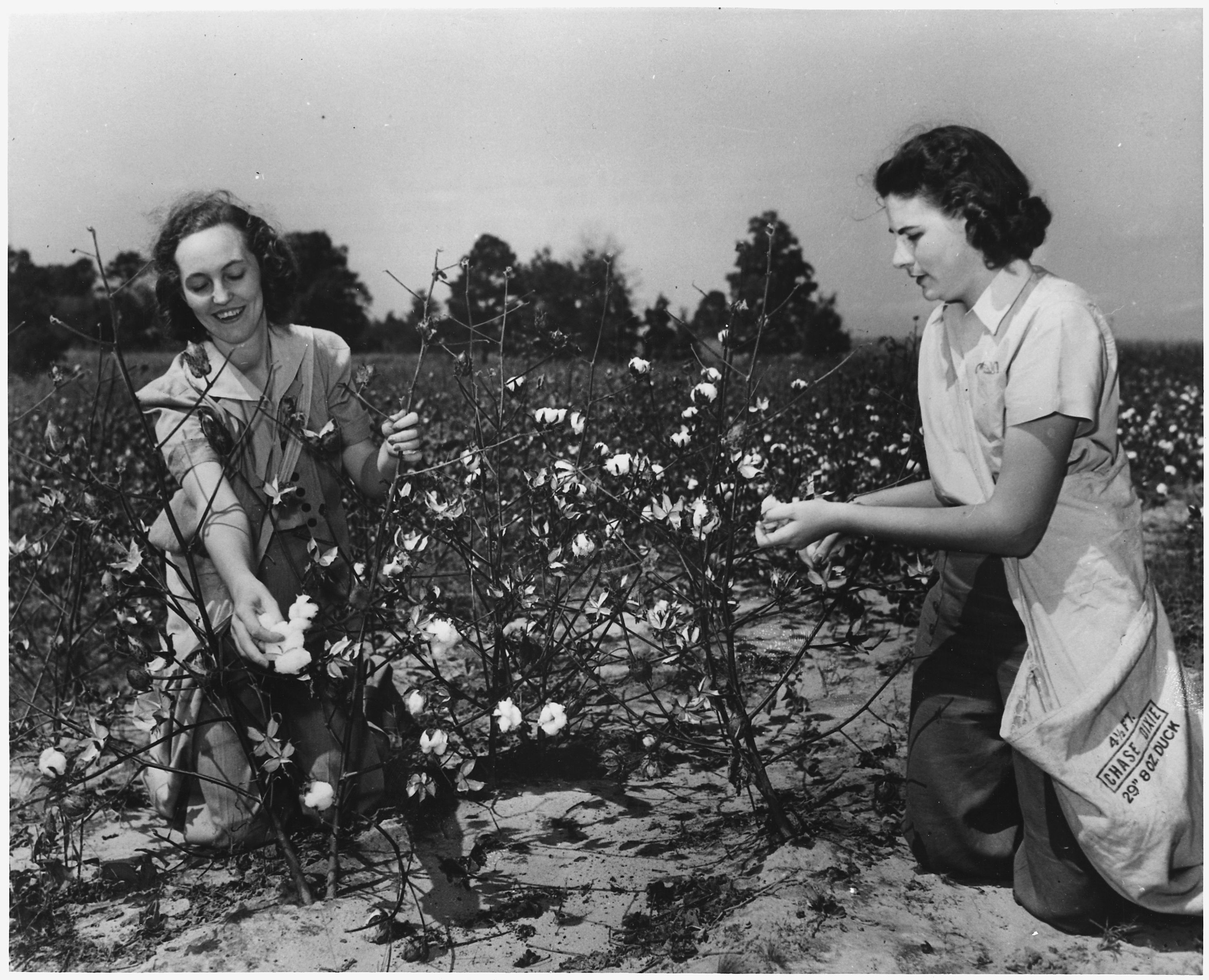
Women picking cotton for the U.S. Crop Corps, c. 1943

This influx of working mothers created a large demand for childcare resources. Several women struggled to balance the responsibilities of the workplace as well as the home, often facing exhaustion and burnout. Absenteeism among working women was often caused by domestic and family obligations. Eventually, a call for increased support in childcare arose, with many arguing that mothers needed assistance with maintaining their households as well as their jobs.

Preceding World War II, options for childcare were quite scarce. Programs such as the Works Project Administration and the Emergency Nursery School program existed, however, the conditions of the facilities that emerged from these programs were less than adequate. Many children became "latchkey kids", who were left to care for themselves or to be supervised by older siblings, which brought up many other concerns regarding safety. In response, the government worked to increase solutions to the issue of childcare.

An impactful development to the growth of childcare options was the Lanham Act of 1940, which directed federal funds towards essential war-related programs, which included childcare. The funding from the Lanham Act helped to establish daycare centers that were located near places of work and were staffed with trained professionals. By the middle of 1944, well over 3,000 centers were in operation, with over 129,000 children enrolled. These daycare centers eased the challenges of working mothers and contributed to the war effort by ensuring a stable workforce.

== In the military ==
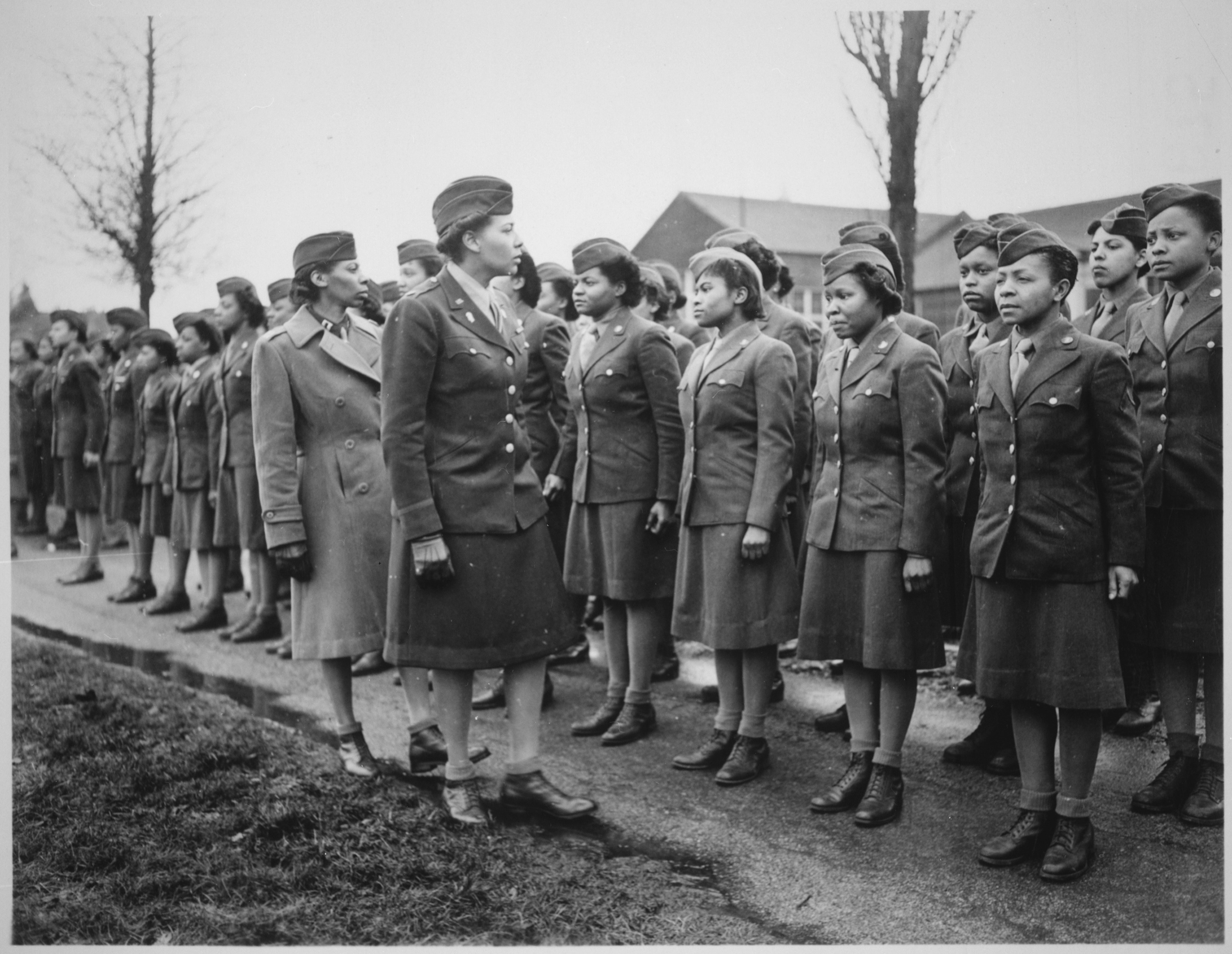
Maj. Charity E. Adams and Capt. Abbie N. Campbell inspect the 6888th Central Postal Directory Battalion while stationed in England, February 15, 1945 (U.S. Department of Defense).

After the Coast Guard hired its first group of civilian women to serve in secretarial and clerical positions in 1941, it then established a Women's Reserve known as the SPARs (after the motto Semper Paratus - Always Ready) in 1942. YN3 Dorothy Tuttle became the first SPAR enlistee when she enlisted in the Coast Guard Women's Reserve on December 7, 1942. LCDR Dorothy Stratton transferred from the Navy to serve as the director of the SPARs. The first five African-American women entered the SPARs in 1945: Olivia Hooker, D. Winifred Byrd, Julia Mosley, Yvonne Cumberbatch, and Aileen Cooke. Also in 1945, SPAR Marjorie Bell Stewart was awarded the Silver Lifesaving Medal by CAPT Dorothy Stratton, becoming the first SPAR to receive the award. SPARs were assigned stateside and served as storekeepers, clerks, photographers, pharmacist's mates, cooks, and in numerous other jobs during World War II. More than 11,000 SPARs served during World War II.

The Army established the Women's Army Auxiliary Corps (WAAC) in 1942, a noteworthy year because WAACs served overseas in North Africa, and because Charity Adams Earley also became the WAAC's first African-American female commissioned officer that year. The organization never accomplished its goal of making available to "the national defense the knowledge, skill, and special training of the women of the nation"; however, as a result, the WAAC was converted to the Women's Army Corps (WAC) in 1943. Recognized as an official part of the regular army, more than 150,000 women served as WACs during the war with thousands were sent to the European and Pacific theaters. In 1944, WACs landed in Normandy after D-Day and served in Australia, New Guinea, and the Philippines in the Pacific. In 1945, the 6888th Central Postal Directory Battalion (the only all African-American, all-female battalion during World War II) worked in England and France, making them the first black female battalion to travel overseas. Commanded by Major Early, the battalion was composed of 30 officers and 800 enlisted women. At the time, African-American recruitment was limited to 10 percent for the WAAC/WAC—matching the demographics of the U.S. population with a total of 6,520 African-American women enrolled for duty. Enlisted basic training was segregated for living, dining, and training, but while living quarters remained segregated at officer training and specialist schools, dining and training facilities there were integrated.

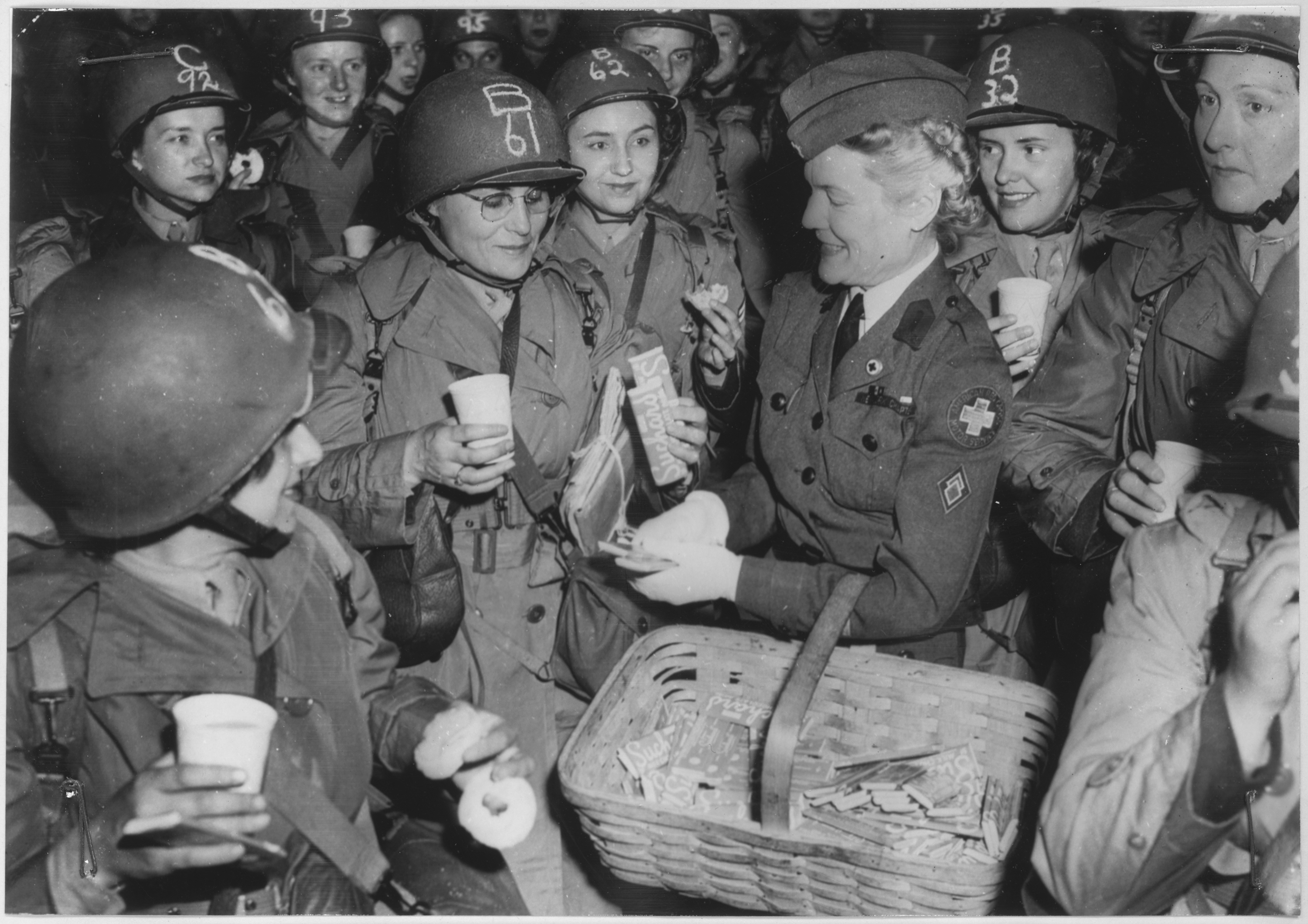
Members of the Women's Army Corps wait to board a ship for Europe in May 1945

In 1942, Carmen Contreras-Bozak, became the first Hispanic to join the WAAC, serving in Algiers under General Dwight D. Eisenhower. She was also the first of approximately 200 Puerto Rican women who would serve in the Women's Army Corps during World War II.

The Women's Army Corps (WAC) also recruited 50 Japanese-American and Chinese-American women and sent them to the Military Intelligence Service Language School at Fort Snelling, Minnesota, for training as military translators. Of these women, 21 were assigned to the Pacific Military Intelligence Research Section at Camp Ritchie, Maryland, where they worked with captured Japanese documents, extracting information about military plans, as well as political and economic information that impacted Japan's ability to conduct the war. Other WAC translators were assigned jobs helping the U.S. Army interface with the United States' Chinese allies. In 1943, the Women's Army Corps recruited a unit of Chinese-American women to serve with the Army Air Forces as "Air WACs". The Army lowered the height and weight requirements for the women of this particular unit referred to as the "Madame Chiang Kai-Shek Air WAC unit". The first two women to enlist in the unit were Hazel (Toy) Nakashima and Jit Wong, both of California. Air WACs served in a large variety of jobs, including aerial photo interpretation, air traffic control, and weather forecasting. Susan Ahn Cuddy became the first Asian-American woman to join the U.S. Navy, in 1942. The Navy however, refused to accept Japanese-American women throughout World War II.

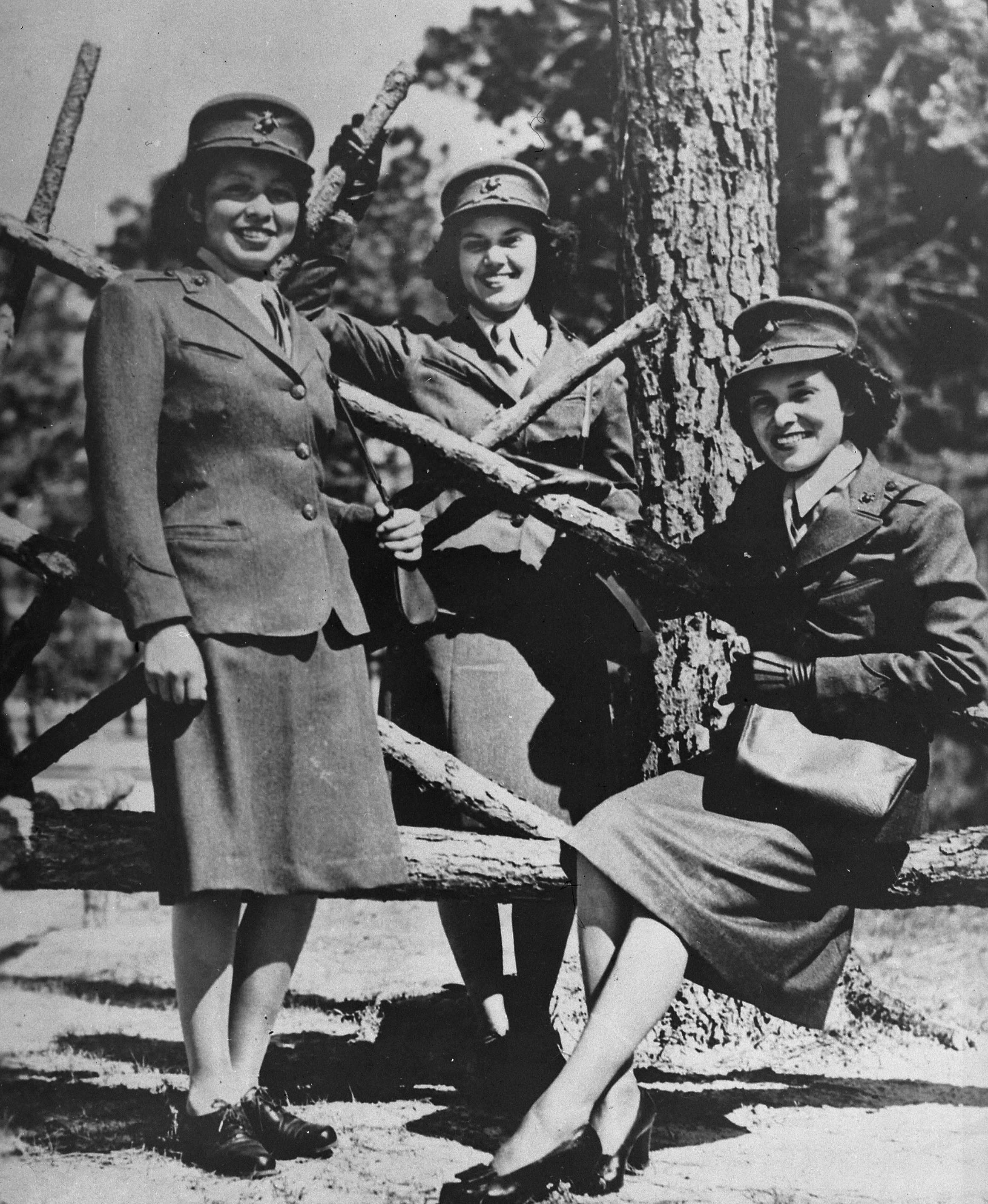
Three Marine Corps reservists at Camp Lejeune, N.C. (from left): Minnie Spotted Wolf (Blackfoot), Celia Mix (Potawatomi), and Viola Eastman (Chippewa), October 16, 1943 (the U.S. Marine Corps, American Indian Select List.

In 1943, the Marine Corps created the Marine Corps Women's Reserve. The first female officer of the United States Marine Corps was also commissioned that year with the first female detachment of marines sent to duty in Hawaii in 1945. The first director of the Marine Corps Women's Reserve was Mrs. Ruth Cheney Streeter from Morristown, New Jersey. Captain Anne Lentz was its first commissioned officer and Private Lucille McClarren its first enlisted woman. Both joined in 1943, as did Minnie Spotted-Wolf, the first Native American woman to enlist in the United States Marines. Many of these Marines served stateside as clerks, cooks, mechanics, and drivers, as well as in other positions. By the end of World War II, 85 percent of the enlisted personnel assigned to the Corps' U.S. headquarters were women.

American women also took part in assuming the defense of the home front. Apart from the number of women who served in the federal military, several women joined the various state guards, organized by individual U.S. states and partially supplied by the War Department, to replace the federally-deployed National Guard. In September 1942, the Idaho State Guard became the first state-level military organization in the United States to induct women into its command structure when Governor Chase A. Clark administered the oath of enlistment to a group of women from the Idaho volunteer auxiliary reserves. In Iowa, a unit composed solely of women and girls was organized in 1943 in Davenport and consisted of roughly 150 members who received training in infantry drill, equitation, first aid, radio code, self-defense, scouting, and patrolling from a captain in the Iowa State Guard.

=== The Manhattan Project ===
Several hundred women were recruited from colleges to take part in the Manhattan Project that built the atomic bomb. They worked as engineers, technicians, and mathematicians throughout the whole project. Moreover, women were not given opportunities to advance to leadership positions and existed as subordinate counterparts to the male scientists involved. A few of these women were Leona Woods, Maria Goeppert Mayer, Chien-Shiung Wu, Isabella Karle, Naomi Livesay, Lilli Hornig, Floy Agnes Lee, and many more unnamed women. Leona Woods was the only woman working at the Hanford site and assisted John Wheeler in determining the cause of the reactor shutdown to be xenon poisoning. Woods also worked under Enrico Fermi on the Chicago Pile, the first self-sustaining nuclear reaction. Along with Leona Woods, Chien-Shiung Wu helped in determining the cause of the Hanford reactor poisoning. Maria Goeppert Mayer investigated the thermodynamic properties of uranium that allowed its isotopes, U-238 and U-235, to be separated via the gaseous diffusion process. Isabella Karle was a chemist in Hanford who was able to synthesize plutonium chloride from plutonium oxide; this work was crucial, as plutonium isotopes were isolated alongside uranium. Naomi Livesay was a mathematician who ran the IBM machines and worked with Richard Feynman to calculate the shock wave that would be produced by an implosion-type bomb. Lilli Hornig studied the solubility of plutonium salts and later on, explosives with her husband. She was present for the Trinity, the first detonation of the nuclear bomb in New Mexico. Floy Agnes Lee was a hematology technician and tested the blood of scientists who had been exposed to radiation. There were many more women, including the "Calutron Girls", who worked at Y-12 at the Oak Ridge National Laboratory operating the Calutrons.

=== Medical personnel ===
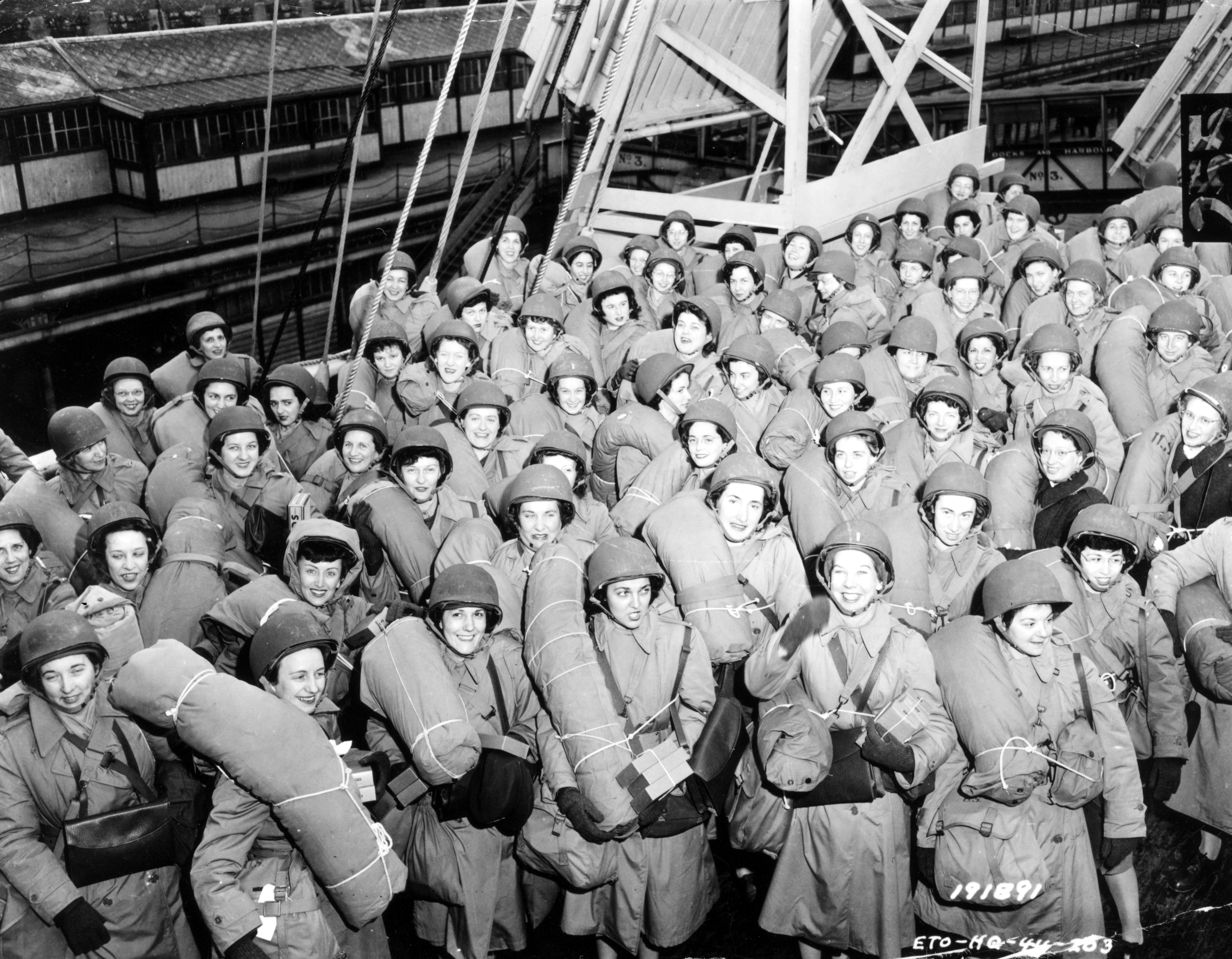
U.S. Army nurses preparing to disembark in Liverpool, England, January 11, 1944

More than 60,000 Army nurses (all military nurses were women at the time) served stateside and overseas during World War II. Although most were kept far from combat, 67 were captured by the Japanese in the Philippines in 1942 and were held as POWs for over two and a half years. Another, an Army flight nurse who had been aboard an aircraft that was shot down behind enemy lines in Germany in 1944, was held as a POW for four months.

In addition, more than 14,000 Navy nurses served stateside, overseas on hospital ships, and as flight nurses. Five were captured by the Japanese on the island of Guam and held as POWs for five months before being exchanged. The second group of eleven were captured in the Philippines and held for 37 months. (During the Japanese occupation of the Philippines, some Filipino-American women smuggled food and medicine to American prisoners of war (POWs) and carried information on Japanese deployments to Filipino and American forces working to sabotage the Japanese Army.) In 1945 Jane Kendeigh became the first Navy flight nurse in an active combat zone, serving at Iwo Jima. Later that year she was the first flight nurse to arrive in Okinawa.

The Navy also recruited women into its Navy Women's Reserve, called Women Accepted for Volunteer Emergency Service (WAVES), starting in 1942. Before the war was over, 84,000 WAVES filled shore billets in a large variety of jobs in communications, intelligence, supply, medicine, and administration.

In 1943, Dr. Margaret Craighill became the first female doctor to become a commissioned officer in the United States Army Medical Corps.

That same year, the U.S. Public Health Service established the Cadet Nurse Corps which trained some 125,000 women for possible military service. Eight percent ultimately provided nursing care in American hospitals.

In 1944, the contributions made by nurses were celebrated when the USS Higbee (DD-806), a GEARING-class destroyer, was launched on November 13. The first warship named for a woman to take part in combat operation, it was named after Lenah S. Higbee, Superintendent of the Navy Nurse Corps from 1911 until 1922.

== Internment ==
Many other women were excluded from war-support efforts. Roughly 120,000 Japanese-Americans and resident Japanese aliens on the West Coast were relocated to Manzanar, Heart Mountain and similar internment camps while at least 10,905 German citizens were held at more than 50 sites across the United States and Hawaii.

By 1942, 695,000 Italian nationals residing in the United States had also been classified as "enemy aliens" with roughly 1,881 detained by the Department of Justice under the Alien and Sedition Act.

== Partial timeline ==
- 1938: The (U.S.) Naval Reserve Act permitted the enlistment of qualified women as nurses.
- 1942: The Women's Reserve of the U. S. Coast Guard Reserve program (officially nicknamed the "SPARS"), was first established in 1942.
- 1942: YN3 Dorothy Tuttle became the first SPAR enlistee when she enlisted in the Coast Guard Women's Reserve on December 7, 1942.
- 1942: The Marine Corps Women's Reserve (MCWR) was authorized by the U.S. Congress in July 1942 to relieve male Marines for combat duty in World War II.
- 1942: U.S. President Franklin D. Roosevelt signed the Public Law 689 creating the Navy's women reserve program on July 30, 1942.
- 1942: The U.S. Women's Army Auxiliary Corps (WAAC) was founded.
- 1942: The name of the U.S. Women's Army Auxiliary Corps (WAAC) was officially changed to Women's Army Corps (WAC).
- 1943: The U.S. Women's Army Corps recruited a unit of Chinese-American women to serve with the Army Air Forces as "Air WACs".
- 1944: Public Law 238 granted full military rank to members of the U.S. Navy Nurse Corps, who were then all women.

== See also ==
- American women in World War I
- Asian American women in World War II
- Timeline of women in warfare in the United States from 1900 to 1949
- Timeline of women in war in the United States, pre-1945
- Timeline of women in warfare in the United States from 1950 to 1999
- Timeline of women in warfare and the military in the United States, 2000–2010
- Timeline of women in warfare and the military in the United States from 2011–present
- Women on the Manhattan Project
