= American women in World War I =

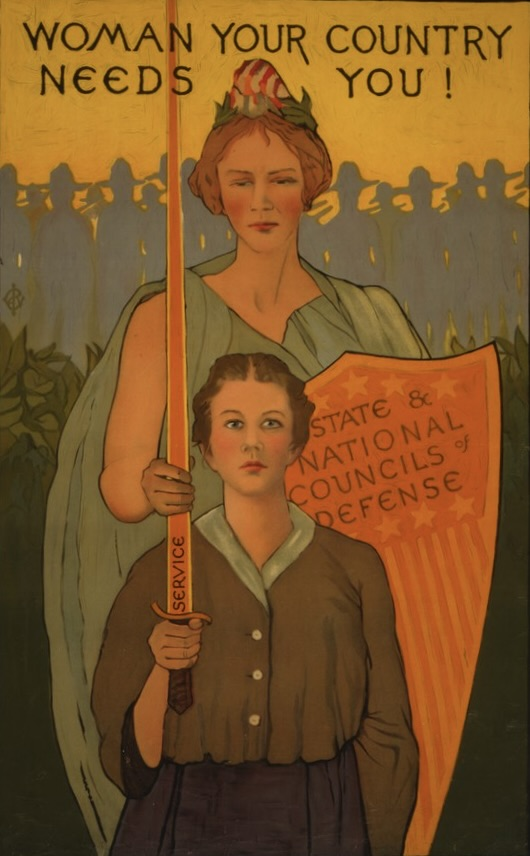
1917 poster encouraging American women to participate in the war effort

World War I marked the first war in which American women were allowed to enlist in the armed forces. While thousands of women did join branches of the army in an official capacity, receiving veterans status and benefits after the war's close, the majority of female involvement was done through voluntary organizations of the war effort or through becoming a nurse for the military. Additionally, women made an impact on the war indirectly by filling the workforce, becoming employed in the jobs left behind by male soldiers.

== U.S. Navy, Marine Corps, and Coast Guard ==
More than 1,476 U.S. Navy nurses (American military nurses were all women then) served in military hospitals stateside and overseas. Over 400 U.S. military nurses died in service, almost all from the Spanish flu epidemic which swept through crowded military camps, hospitals, and ports of embarkation.

The first American women enlisted into the regular armed forces were 13,500 women admitted into active duty in the U.S. Navy. They served stateside in jobs and received the same benefits and responsibilities as men, including identical pay (US$28.75 per month), and were treated as veterans after the war.

The U.S. Marine Corps enlisted 305 female Marine Reservists (F) to "free men to fight" by filling positions such as clerks and telephone operators on the home front.

During World War I, in January 1918, Myrtle Hazard became the first woman to enlist in the U.S. Coast Guard. She was the only woman to serve in the Coast Guard during World War I. As there was no official women's uniform at the time, she chose her own ensemble, a middy blouse and a blue pleated skirt. She is the namesake of USCGC Myrtle Hazard. Wartime newspapers erroneously reported that twin sisters Genevieve and Lucille Baker were the first women to serve in the Coast Guard. While they tried to enlist, they were not accepted.

Many women were demobilized when hostilities ceased, and aside from the Nurse Corps, the uniformed military once again became exclusively male. In 1942, women were brought into the military again, largely following the British model.

== U.S. Army ==
During the course of the war, 21,498 U.S. Army nurses (American military nurses were all women then) served in military hospitals in the United States and overseas. Many of these women were positioned near to battlefields, and they tended to over a million soldiers who had been wounded or were unwell. 272 U.S. Army nurses died of disease (mainly tuberculosis, influenza, and pneumonia). Eighteen African-American Army nurses served stateside caring for German prisoners of war (POWs) and African-American soldiers. They were assigned to Camp Grant, IL, and Camp Sherman, OH, and lived in segregated quarters.

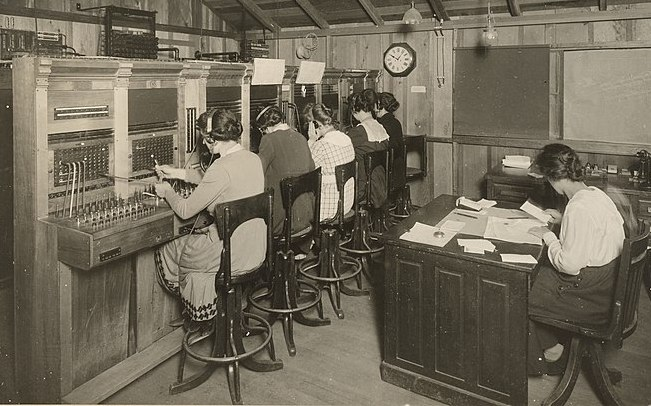
Switchboard operators in the Army Signal Corps

Hello Girls was the colloquial name for American female switchboard operators in World War I, formally known as the Signal Corps Female Telephone Operators Unit. During World War I, these switchboard operators were sworn into the Army Signal Corps. This corps was formed in 1917 from a call by General John J. Pershing to improve the worsening state of communications on the Western front. Applicants for the Signal Corps Female Telephone Operators Unit had to be bilingual in English and French to ensure that orders would be heard by anyone. Over 7,000 women applied, but only 450 women were accepted. Many of these women were former switchboard operators or employees at telecommunications companies. Despite the fact that they wore Army Uniforms and were subject to Army Regulations (and Chief Operator Grace Banker received the Distinguished Service Medal), they were not given honorable discharges but were considered "civilians" employed by the military, because Army Regulations specified the male gender. Not until 1978, the 60th anniversary of the end of World War I, did Congress approve veteran status and honorable discharges for the surviving women who had served in the Signal Corps Female Telephone Operators Unit.

== Labor movement and working women ==
During WWI, large numbers of women were recruited into jobs that had either been vacated by men who had gone to fight in the war, or had been created as part of the war effort. The high demand for weapons and the overall wartime situation resulted in munitions factories collectively becoming the largest employer of American women by 1918. While there was initial resistance to hiring women for jobs traditionally held by men, the war made the need for labor so urgent that women were hired in large numbers and the government even actively promoted the employment of women in war-related industries through recruitment drives. As a result, women not only began working in heavy industry, but also took other jobs traditionally reserved solely for men, such as railway guards, ticket collectors, bus and tram conductors, postal workers, police officers, firefighters, and clerks.

World War I saw women taking traditionally men's jobs in large numbers for the first time in American history. Many women worked on the assembly lines of factories, producing trucks and munitions, while department stores employed African American women as elevator operators and cafeteria waitresses for the first time. The Food Administration helped housewives prepare more nutritious meals with less waste and with optimum use of the foods available. Most important, the morale of the women remained high, as millions joined the Red Cross as volunteers to help soldiers and their families, and with rare exceptions, the women did not protest the draft.

The Department of Labor created a Women in Industry group, headed by prominent labor researcher and social scientist Mary van Kleeck. This group helped develop standards for women who were working in industries connected to the war alongside the War Labor Policies Board, of which van Kleeck was also a member. After the war, the Women in Industry Service group developed into the U.S. Women's Bureau, headed by Mary Anderson.

== Voluntary and third party organizations ==
Social status often dictated the way in which a woman was involved in the war effort. Working-class women were generally the ones enlisting in the armed forces or taking over jobs left behind, while middle and upper-class women generally participated in voluntary organizations. These were the women with more free time, whose living standards did not necessitate that they earn a salary. One prominent issue at the outset of the war was how to organize and coordinate female support and service, which led for female leaders to push for the creation of the Woman's Committee of the Council of National Defense (WCND), established by the Wilson administration to serve as an advisory committee. The Committee appropriated projects to voluntary organizations such as the Red Cross, Women's Temperance Union and others, in order to drum up support for the war and mobilize the female half of the population amidst rising manpower concerns.

== Women and the anti-war movement ==
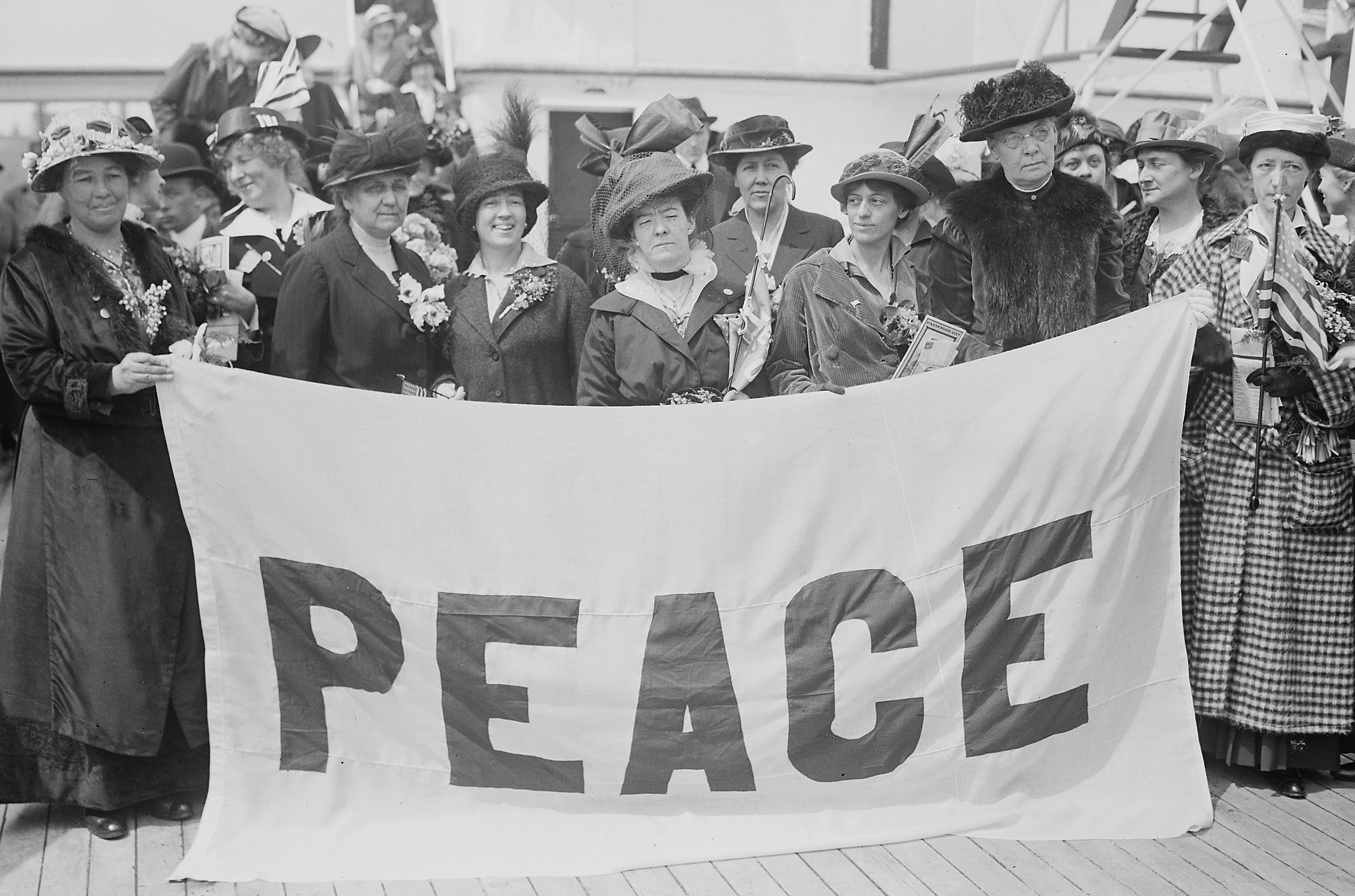
Delegates to the April 1915 Women's International Congress for Peace and Freedom aboard the MS Noordam with a "PEACE" banner

While women were lauded for their patriotism and support in the Great War, many were also involved in protesting the war and encouraging an internationally agreed upon framework for a return to peace. Alice Paul, the famed advocate for women's suffrage, led the National Women's Party in multiple protests at the White House. One argument commonly made was that the United States should not have been intervening abroad, when they were still not providing equal rights and assurances to its own citizens, including still not allowing women to vote. The Woman's Peace Party, led by President Jane Addams, was another strong voice that came out in opposition to the war. By 1915, the organization had over 40,000 members. Jane Addams met with President Woodrow Wilson six times to discuss the war.

== Prominent women in World War I ==
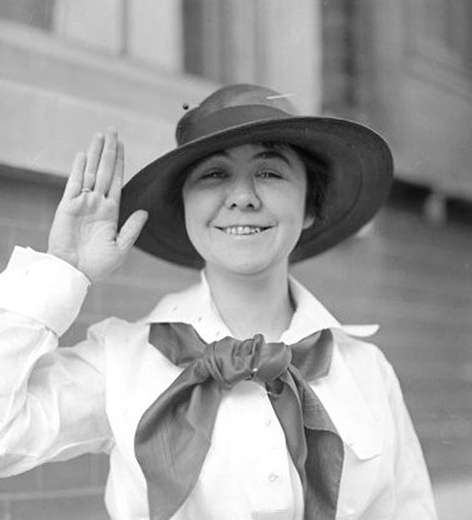
- Portrait of Loretta Walsh, 1917
  1908: Lenah H. Sutcliffe Higbee: was a Canadian-born US Army nurse, and the first woman for which a US Naval Ship was named. Lenah was one of the first twenty women to join the Navy Nurse Corps in 1908. She rose through the ranks and served as the second Superintendent of the US Navy Nurse Corps during World War I. She was one of four women to be awarded the Navy Cross, and the only one out of the four to be alive at the time of receiving the award. After her death in 1941, the USS Higbee, a US Naval warship, was commissioned in 1945.
- 1917: Loretta Perfectus Walsh became the first active-duty U.S. Navy woman, and the first woman to serve in any of the U.S. armed forces in a non-nurse occupation on enlisting in the U.S. Naval Reserve on March 17, 1917. Walsh subsequently became the first woman U.S. Navy petty officer when she was sworn in as Chief Yeoman on March 21, 1917.
- 1917: Julia Catherine Stimson volunteered for the military service as a nurse. She was the first woman to become a Major in the U.S. military, and she was awarded the Distinguished Service Medal and the Royal Red Cross. Stimson was promoted to Colonel just before her death in 1948. Prior to her death, Stimson also returned as the chief of the Nursing Council on National Defense during WWII.
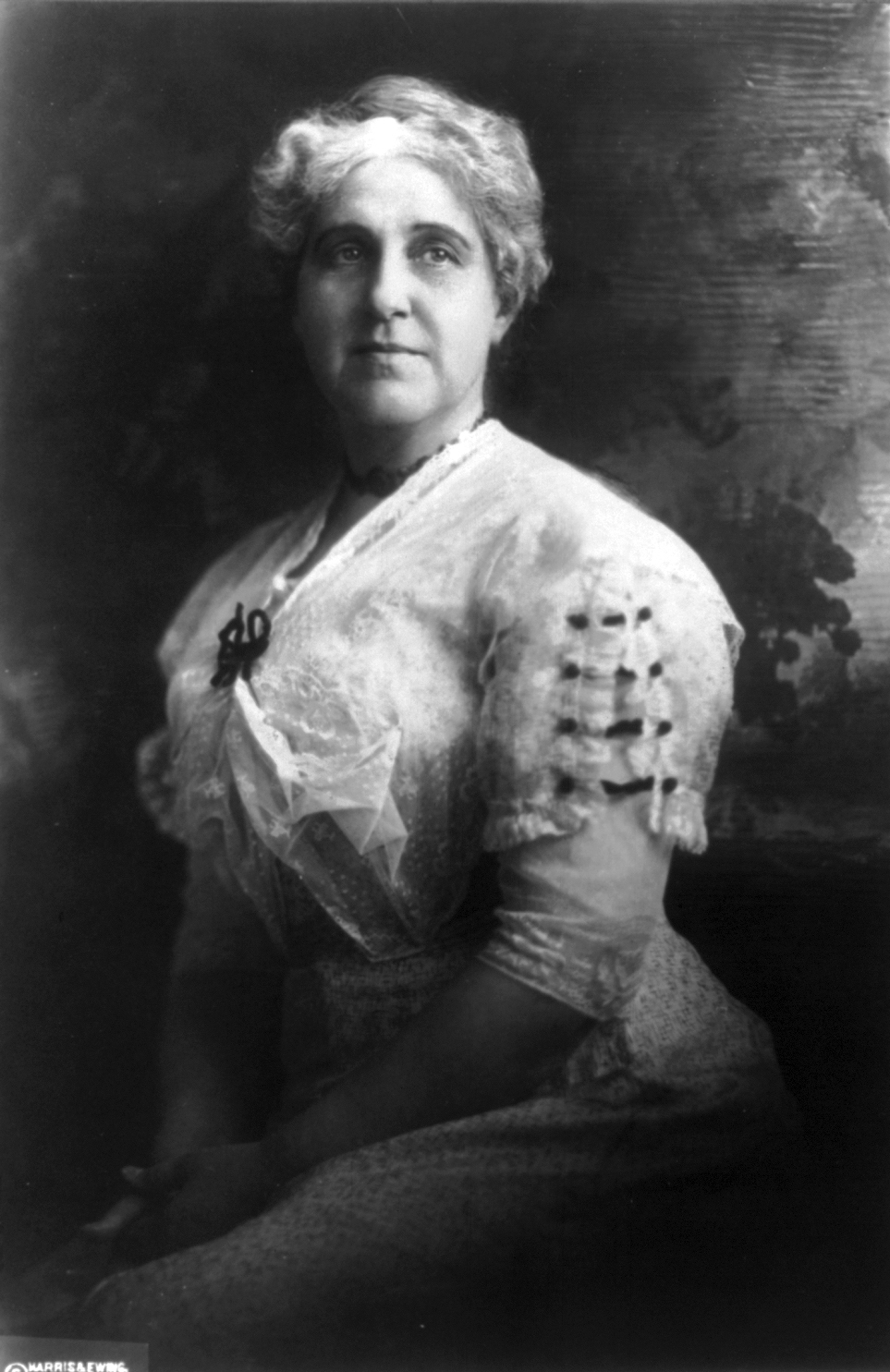
  Portrait of Jane Arminda Delano, 1914
- 1917: Julia Hunt Catlin Park DePew Taufflieb was the first American woman to be awarded the French Croix de Guerre and Legion d’honneur, because she had transformed her mansion into a hospital near the front lines of battle in France. The hospital held 300 beds, and its location was prime for aiding wounded troops. She inspired many other Americans to join the war effort by opening up their own hospitals.
- 1917: In 1917 World War I Army nurses Edith Ayres and Helen Wood (nurses held no rank during World War I) became the first female members of the U.S. military killed in the line of duty. They were killed on May 20, 1917, while with Base Hospital #12 aboard the USS Mongolia en route to France. The ship's crew fired the deck guns during a practice drill, and one of the guns exploded, spewing shell fragments across the deck and killing Nurse Ayres and her friend Nurse Helen Wood.
- 1918: Jane Arminda Delano worked as an Army nurse during the Spanish–American War, and continued her work with the Red Cross after that time. During World War I, Jane stayed on the home front and organized nurses to go overseas and work with wounded soldiers. She was in charge of over 20,000 nurses, who all worked in vital roles overseas in the war. In 1918, Jane went to Europe to attend a nursing conference and to continue her work. However, she fell ill there and died in 1919. Because of her illnesses, she could not work as much as she liked, and her last words were "I must get back to my work". She was awarded the Distinguished Service Medal by the Secretary of the US Army.
- May 30, 1918: Frances Gulick was a US Y.M.C.A. welfare worker who was awarded a United States Army citation for valor and courage on the field during the aerial bombardment of Varmaise, Oise, France.
- July, 1918: Due to activism by Ada Belle Thoms and the National Association of Colored Graduate Nurses (NACGN) of which Thoms was president, the Surgeon General agreed to limited enrollment of African American nurses in the U.S. Army Nurse Corps. Thoms also played a critical role in lobbying the American Red Cross to permit the enrollment of black nurses during World War I.
- August 13, 1918: Opha May Johnson became the first woman to enlist in the United States Marine Corps as part of the United States Marine Corps Women's Reserve.
- 1918: Twin sisters Genevieve and Lucille Baker of the Naval Coastal Defense Reserve became the first uniformed women to serve in the U.S. Coast Guard.
- 2007: The last U.S. female veteran of World War I died, a former yeoman (F) named Charlotte Winters.
- During her time in France, Mildred Aldrich wrote 3 books, (A Hilltop on the Marne (1915), On the Edge of the War Zone (1917), and When Johnny Comes Marching Home (1919)).The French believed these books helped convince the American government to declare war on Germany. Aldrich was awarded the Legion of Honour by the French Government for this.

== See also ==
- Timeline of women in war in the United States, pre-1945
- Timeline of women in warfare in the United States from 1900 to 1949
- United States home front during World War I
