= Chief petty officer (United States) =

Military rank of the United States

- The collar and cap device for the U.S. Navy and Coast Guard

- Service dress insignia for the U.S. Navy and Coast Guard
- Country: United States
- Service branch: United States Navy; United States Coast Guard
- Abbreviation: CPO
- NATO rank code: OR-7
- Pay grade: E-7
- Formation: 1 April 1893
- Next higher rank: Senior chief petty officer
- Next lower rank: Petty officer first class
- Equivalent ranks: Gunnery sergeant (USMC); Sergeant First Class (Army); Master sergeant (USAF & USSF)

Chief petty officer (CPO) is the seventh enlisted rank (with the pay grade E-7) in the United States Navy and U.S. Coast Guard, is above petty officer first class and below senior chief petty officer.

Enlisted personnel are divided into three subdivisions or levels, the lowest level being non-rated members without a designated occupation (E-1 through E-3) who are in training, known as an apprenticeship, to become rated; becoming a rated sailor and advancing to E-4 is dependent on graduating from a specialty school that define what the enlisted is rated for.

The second level is rated sailors who are petty officers (E-4 through E-6) who are NCOs or non-commissioned officers.

Finally, the third level are Chief Petty Officers (E-7 through E-9) that are SNCOs or senior non-commissioned officers and part of the rated force and considered extremely knowledgeable about their particular rating.

The term "rating" is used to identify the career field of a chief petty officer. For example, the title of a chief petty officer in the Master-at-Arms rating would be spoken or spelled out as Chief Master-at-Arms. The title would be abbreviated MAC. The grade of chief petty officer was established on 1 April 1893 in the United States Navy. The United States Congress first authorized the Coast Guard to use the promotion to chief petty officer on 18 May 1920. Chief petty officer is also the final cadet grade in the United States Naval Sea Cadet Corps.

Prior to 1958, chief petty officer was the highest enlisted grade in both the U.S. Navy and U.S. Coast Guard. This changed with the passage of Pub. L. 85–422, the Military Pay Act of 1958, which established two new pay grades of E-8 and E-9 in all five branches of the U.S. Armed Forces. In the U.S. Navy and U.S. Coast Guard, the new E-8 pay grade was called senior chief petty officer (SCPO) and the new E-9 pay grade master chief petty officer (MCPO), with the first selectees promoting to their respective grades in 1959 and 1960.

Prior to establishment of the E-8 and E-9 grades, chief petty officers could typically serve in uniform for 30 or more years.

== Role ==
Video about chiefs

Navy chief petty officers serve a dual role as both technical experts and as leaders, with an increasing emphasis on leadership as they progress through the CPO pay grades. Like petty officers, every chief petty officer has both a rate (unlike the land and air services, rank only refers to commissioned officers in the U.S. Navy and U.S. Coast Guard) and a rating (i.e., job specialty, similar to an MOS in the U.S. Army and U.S. Marine Corps, or an AFSC in U.S. Air Force). A chief petty officer's full title is a combination of the two. Thus, a chief petty officer who has the rating of gunner's mate would be referred to as a chief gunner's mate (GMC).

Each rating has an official abbreviation, such as QM for quartermaster, BM for boatswain's mate, and FC for fire controlman. When combined with the Petty Officer level, this gives the short-hand for the Chief's rate, such as BMC for Chief Boatswain's Mate. It is not uncommon practice to refer to the Chief by this shorthand in all but the most formal correspondence (such as printing and inscription on awards). Usually, Chief Petty Officers are referred to in conversation as "Chief", regardless of their rating.

In the U.S. Navy, both commissioned officers and chief petty officers are often colloquially referred to as "Khakis". In the past, commissioned officers and chief petty officers wore khaki-colored uniforms both while on board seagoing vessels and ashore, as opposed to petty officers and seamen, who were referred to as deckplate sailors, or blueshirts. However, since 2009, while the khaki service uniform is still occasionally worn ashore, the U.S. Navy has progressed to utilizing a green/tan/black camouflage working uniform (NWU Type IIIs); replacing the daily wear of khaki service uniforms while on board vessels and ashore. During this time, a newly adopted Service Uniform for sailors in pay grades E-6 and below, consisting of a khaki shirt and black trousers was implemented. The latter has caused some discontent among some chief petty officers and commissioned officers as a result. In the U.S. Coast Guard, petty officers, chief petty officers, warrant officers, and commissioned officers all wear similar uniforms.

Uniquely among the U.S. uniformed services, a Coast Guard chief petty officer may also serve as officer-in-charge of a unit. Such units may include small boat stations or detachments or a Marine Protector-class patrol boat.

== Initiation ==
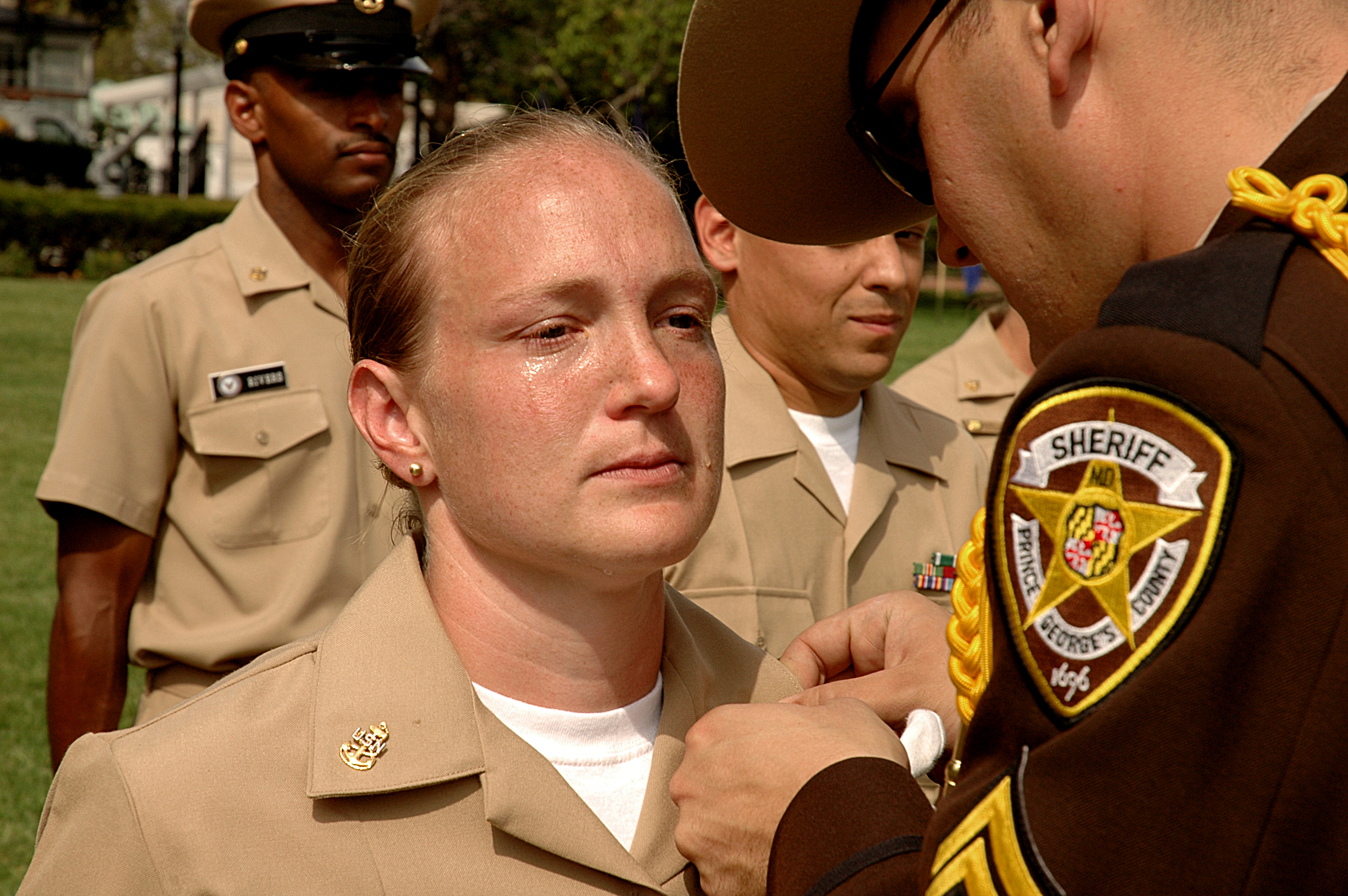
A sailor has her chief anchor device pinned on her collar by a deputy sheriff during a "pinning" ceremony signifying her advancement to CPO.

The Navy and Coast Guard are distinct among the U.S. Armed Forces in that promotion to the pay grade of E-7 traditionally has involved a set of specialized activities known collectively as "Initiation". The terms "Orientation", "Induction", and "CPO 365 Phase II" have been used in the past with several differences in the evolutions and training involved as part of the season.

On May 30, 2017, Master Chief Petty Officer of the Navy Steven Giordano announced:

"The process creating Chief Petty Officers should once again be referred to as "Initiation". We are Initiating new Chief Petty Officers, and providing a roadmap for people to be successful in life — whatever the course."

== Advancement ==
Unlike petty officer first class and lower grades, advancement to chief petty officer not only carries requirements of time in rate (TIR), superior evaluation scores, and specialty examinations, but also carries an added requirement of peer review. A chief petty officer can only advance after review by a selection board of serving senior and master chief petty officers, in effect "choosing their own".

Advancement into the chief petty officer grades is the most significant promotion within the enlisted naval grades. At the grade of chief petty officer, the sailor takes on more administrative duties. Personnel in the three chief petty officer rates also have conspicuous privileges such as separate dining and living areas. Any naval vessel of sufficient size has a room or rooms that are off-limits to anyone not a chief (including commissioned officers), except by specific invitation. In naval jargon, this room is called the Chief's Mess.

== Deckplate leaders ==
In naval terminology, the deckplate can roughly refer to the deck ("flooring"), or the area of the deck of a ship or boat (submarine). It can also refer to the division officer and chief petty officer leadership. The term deckplate leaders is a colloquial term referring to the senior enlisted personnel of the grade of chief petty officer and higher. They are generally charged with keeping good order and discipline within the lower enlisted grades.

== Insignia and emblem ==
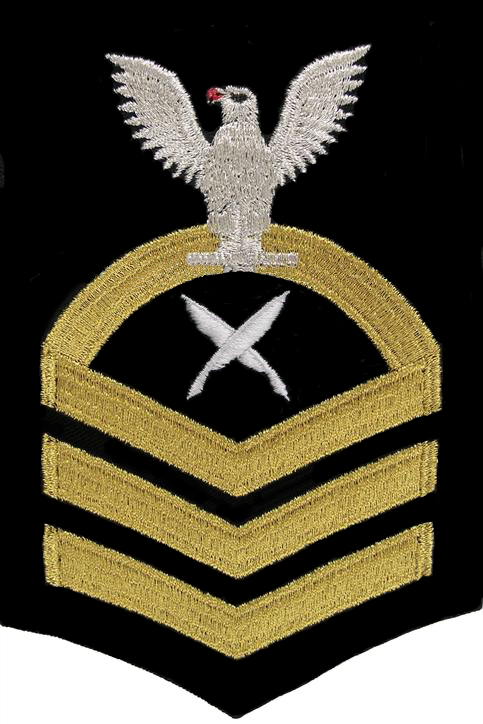
U.S. Navy left sleeve insignia for a Chief Yeoman on Service Dress Blue/Full Dress Blue or Dinner Dress Blue Jacket

Rate insignia in the Navy and Coast Guard are mostly identical. A chief petty officer's rate insignia is a perched eagle with spread wings (often affectionately referred to as a "crow") above three chevrons topped by a rocker. The rating emblem is displayed below the crow, within the area bordered by the rocker and the uppermost chevron. The chevrons and rocker are either red or gold. In the Navy enlisted members with at least 12 consecutive years of service in the armed forces wear gold chevrons. (Until 2019 the color would only change to gold if a sailor had a non-disciplinary record for this length of time.) The Coast Guard never had such rules; a Coast Guard chief petty officer's sleeve insignia is always gold, and rates below chief petty officer are always red.

On the dress blue uniform (and variants such as mess whites), the insignia is worn on the left arm of the uniform blouse (or "suit coat" in civilian terminology). On all other uniforms other than the Type III Navy Working Uniform, the insignia used is worn on the collar and has become universally accepted as the symbol of the chief petty officer, which is a fouled (i.e., entwined in the anchor chain) gold anchor superimposed with the letters "USN" in silver in the Navy, or a silver shield in the Coast Guard.

A U.S. Navy chief petty officer's rate emblem is symbolized by a fouled anchor with the letters "USN" centered on the anchor.

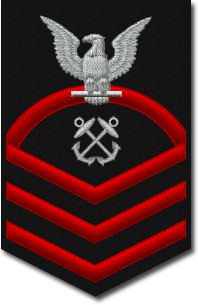
The shoulder sleeve insignia of a U.S. Navy Chief boatswain's mate, with three red chevrons and one rocker, denoting less than 12 years of service.

A U.S. Coast Guard chief petty officer's rate emblem is symbolized by a fouled anchor with a shield superimposed on its shank. The anchor is emblematic of "the chief" and represents stability and security. It serves to remind the chief petty officer of their responsibility to keep those they serve safe from harm's way. The significance of the shield date to the days of the Revenue Cutter Service when Congress added the shield to the ensign of the Cutter Service to distinguish cutters from other naval vessels. The chain is symbolic of flexibility and strength and serves to remind the chief petty officer that the chain of life is forged day-by-day, link-by-link. The chain also represents the reliance of one chief petty officer on another to get the job done and reminds him not to be the weak link in the chain. The chain fouled around the anchor represents "the sailor's disgrace" and serves to remind chief petty officers that there may be times when circumstances are beyond their control in the performance of their duty, but a chief petty officer must complete the task.

== See also ==
- List of United States Navy enlisted rates
- List of United States Coast Guard enlisted ranks
- List of United States Navy ratings
- Edna Young, first woman to be appointed Chief petty officer in United States Navy history
