= Myrtle Hazard =

American Coast Guard technician

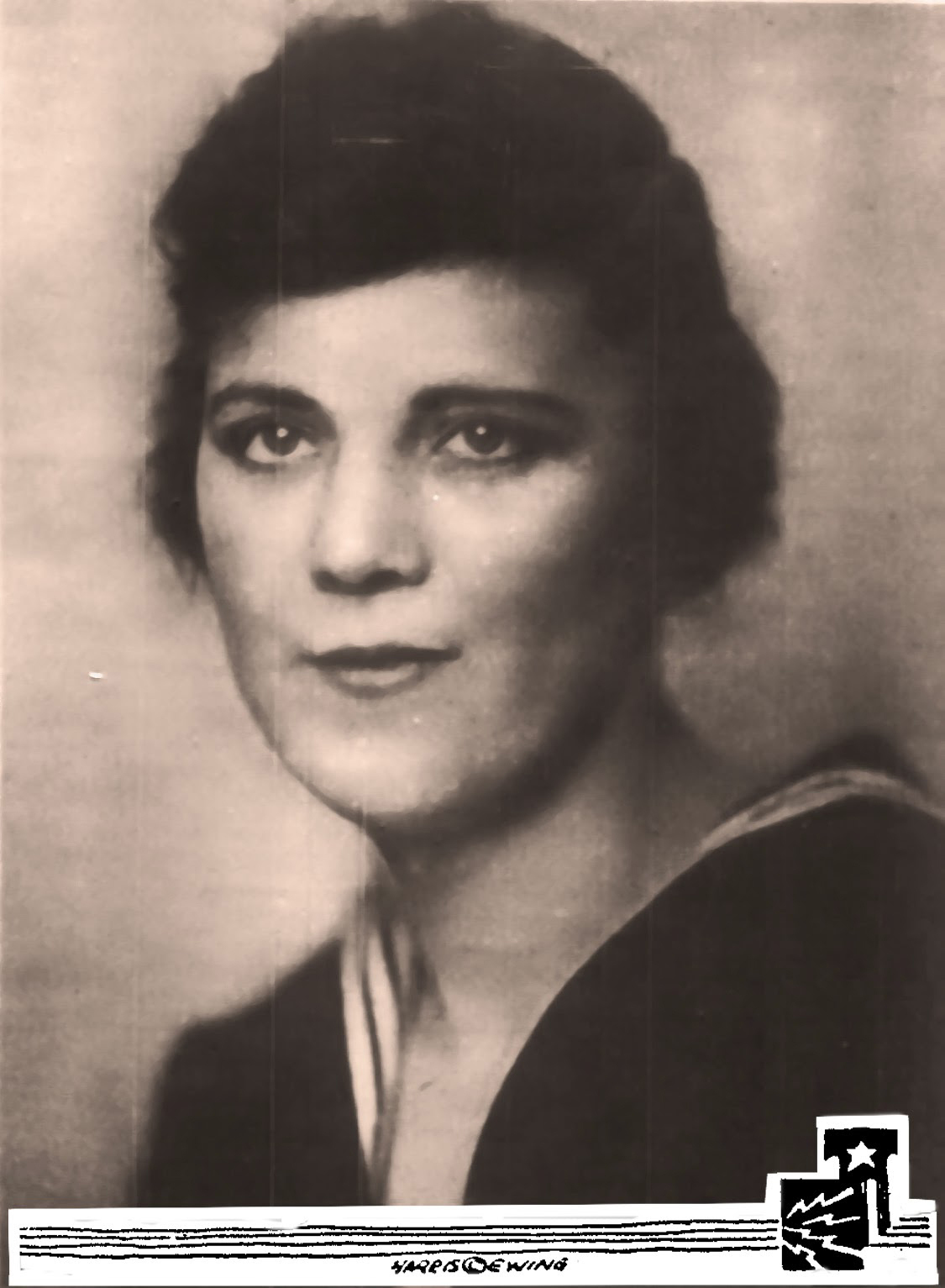
- Myrtle Hazard in her Coast Guard uniform, 1918.
- Born: Myrtle Rae Holthaus; 1892; Baltimore
- Died: May 19, 1951 (aged 58–59); Baltimore
- Other name: Myrtle Gambrill (after second marriage)
- Occupation: Electrician's Mate
- Known for: First woman to enlist in the U. S. Coast Guard (1918)

Myrtle Rae Holthaus Hazard (1892 – May 19, 1951), later Myrtle Gambrill, was an American electrician and radio operator in the United States Coast Guard during World War I. She was the first woman to enlist in the Coast Guard, and the only woman to serve in the Coast Guard during World War I.

== Early life ==
Myrtle Rae Holthaus was from Baltimore, the daughter of Charles H. Holthaus and Lillian (Lillie) Otto Holthaus. Hazard, who survived polio as a girl, learned radio and telegraph skills in an evening course offered at the YMCA in Baltimore.

== Career ==
In January 1918, during World War I, Hazard enlisted and became a radio operator for the Coast Guard. As there was no official women's uniform, she chose her own ensemble, a middy blouse and a blue pleated skirt. Hazard lived with her parents and son in Baltimore, and worked in Washington, D.C. until the end of the war. She concluded her service in November 1919 as an Electrician's Mate 1st Class. She was the first woman to enlist in the Coast Guard, the only woman to serve in the Coast Guard during World War I, and the first woman to hold electrician status in the Coast Guard. (Wartime newspapers erroneously reported that twin sisters Genevieve and Lucille Baker were the first women to serve in the Coast Guard; in fact, while they tried to enlist during the war, they were not accepted.) For her service, she received the Order of St. Sava from the government of Serbia. "I like to think I helped prove that women can contribute more to national defense than just waiting for the war to end," she told an interviewer in 1950.

== Personal life and legacy ==
In 1910, at age 18, Myrtle Holthaus married Claude A. Hazard, who worked in the Panama Canal Zone. They had a son, Claude Jack Hazard. She later remarried, to Henry Webster "Harry" Gambrill. She died in 1951.

In 2019, her name was included in J. Luis Correa's address in Congress, honoring the Coast Guard on its 229th year.

In 2010, Charles "Skip" W. Bowen, who was then the Coast Guard's most senior non-commissioned officer, proposed that all the cutters in the Sentinel class should be named after enlisted sailors in the Coast Guard, or one of its precursor services, who particularly distinguished themselves. In May, 2020, the Coast Guard accepted the 39th cutter in the class, named USCGC Myrtle Hazard, in Hazard's honor.
