= USCGC Myrtle Hazard =

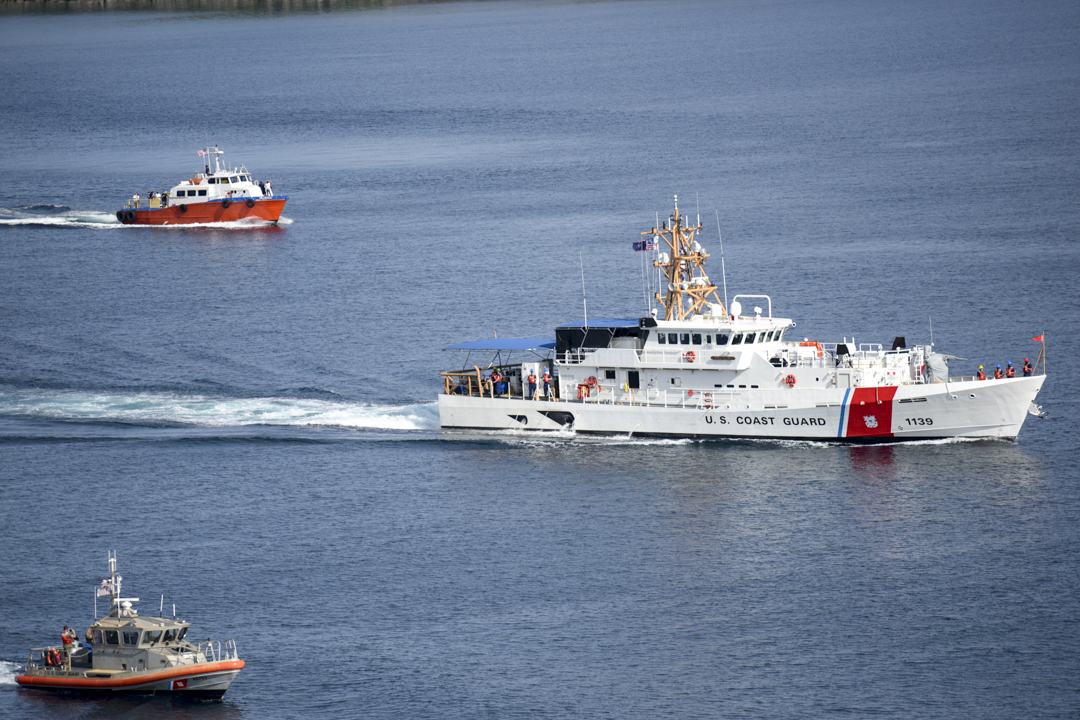
- USCGC Myrtle Hazard arrives at Guam

History

United States
- Name: Myrtle Hazard
- Namesake: Myrtle Hazard
- Operator: United States Coast Guard
- Builder: Bollinger Shipyards, Lockport, Louisiana
- Acquired: May 28, 2020
- Commissioned: July 29, 2021
- Home port: Santa Rita, Guam
- Identification: Hull number: WPC-1139
- Motto: First to Serve
- Status: in active service
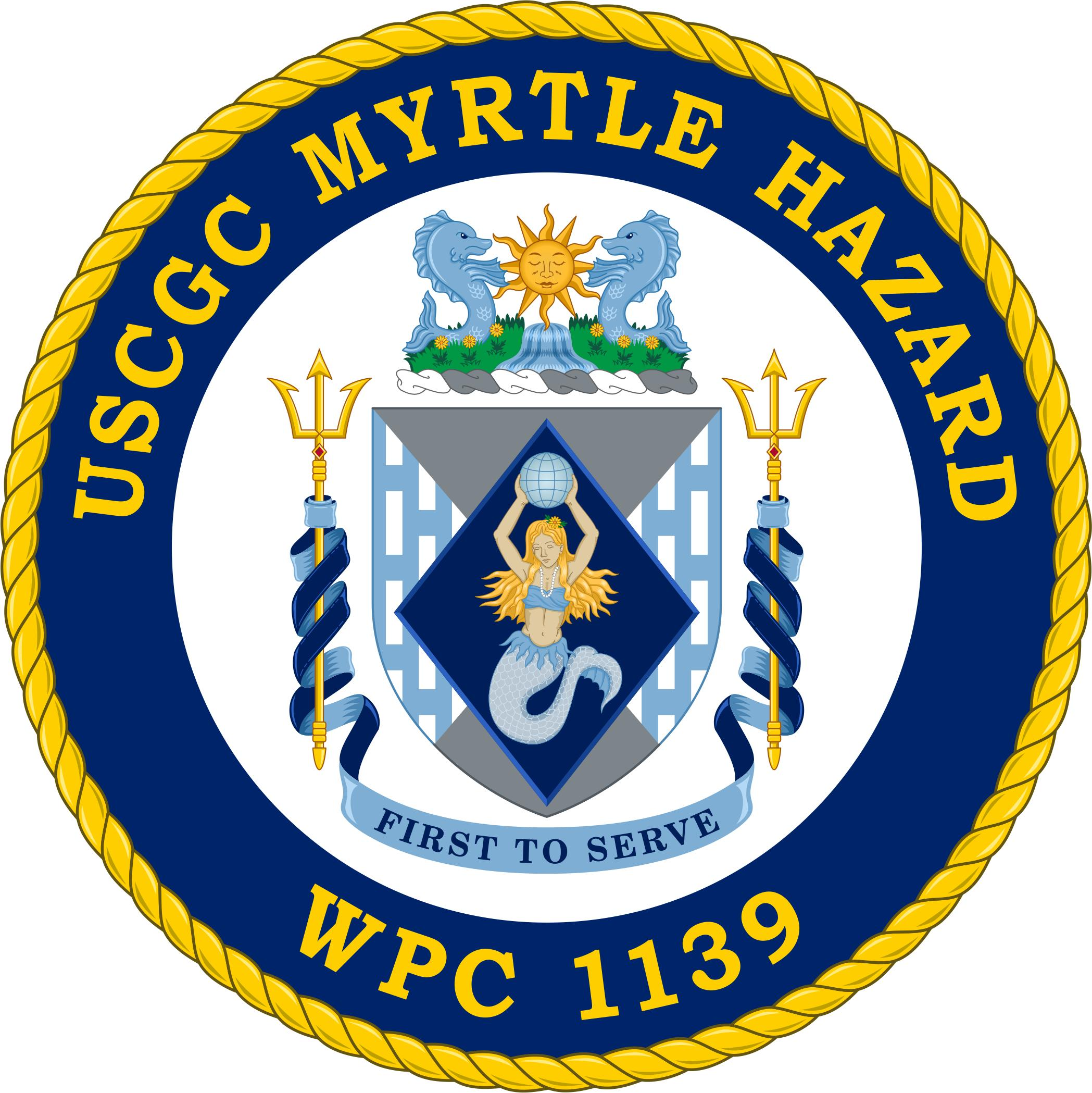
- Badge

General characteristics
- Class & type: Sentinel-class cutter
- Displacement: 353 long tons (359 t)
- Length: 46.8 m (154 ft)
- Beam: 8.11 m (26.6 ft)
- Depth: 2.9 m (9.5 ft)
- Propulsion: 2 × 4,300 kW (5,800 shp); 1 × 75 kW (101 shp) bow thruster
- Speed: 28 knots (52 km/h; 32 mph)
- Range: 2,500 nautical miles (4,600 km; 2,900 mi)
- Endurance: 5 days
- Boats & landing craft carried: 1 × Cutter Boat - Over the Horizon Interceptor
- Complement: 4 officers, 20 crew
- Sensors & processing systems: L-3 C4ISR suite
- Armament: 1 × Mk 38 Mod 2 25 mm automatic gun; 4 × crew-served Browning M2 machine guns
- Notes: First Commanding Officer LT Tony Seleznick

USCGC Myrtle Hazard (WPC-1139) is the United States Coast Guard's 39th Sentinel-class cutter.

Like her sister ships she was built in the Bollinger Shipyards, in Lockport, Louisiana.

== Design ==
Like her sister ships, Myrtle Hazard is designed and created to perform search and rescue missions, port security, and the interception of smugglers. She is armed with a remotely-controlled, gyro-stabilized 25 mm autocannon, four crew served M2 Browning machine guns, and light arms. She is equipped with a stern launching ramp, that allows her to launch or retrieve a water-jet propelled high-speed auxiliary boat, without first coming to a stop. Her high-speed boat has over-the-horizon capability, and is useful for inspecting and checking out other vessels, and deploying boarding parties.

The crew's drinking water needs are met through a desalination unit. The crew mess is equipped with a television with satellite reception.

== Operational career ==
The vessel was given to the Coast Guard base in Key West for her acceptance trials on May 28, 2020. It took the Myrtle Hazard two months to sail from Key West, where she completed her acceptance trials, to her homeport of Santa Rita, Guam. She was formally commissioned in Guam along with her sister ships Oliver Henry and Frederick Hatch on July 29, 2021. In 2022, the Myrtle Hazard took part in Operation Blue Pacific, conducting sovereignty and fisheries patrols in five Pacific island nations. In late May 2022, the Myrtle Hazard was diverted from Operation Blue Pacific to the Solomon Islands to patrol its Exclusive Economic Zone while the Royal Solomon Islands Police Vessel Taro was undergoing maintenance.

== Namesake ==
In 2010, Charles "Skip" W. Bowen, who was formerly the United States Coast Guard's most senior non-commissioned officer, proposed that all 58 cutters in the Sentinel class should be named after enlisted sailors in the Coast Guard, or one of its precursor services, who were recognized for their heroism. The Coast Guard chose Myrtle Hazard, their first female sailor, as the namesake of the 39th cutter. Hazard worked as a radio operator and electrician.
