= Jane Kendeigh =

American flight nurse

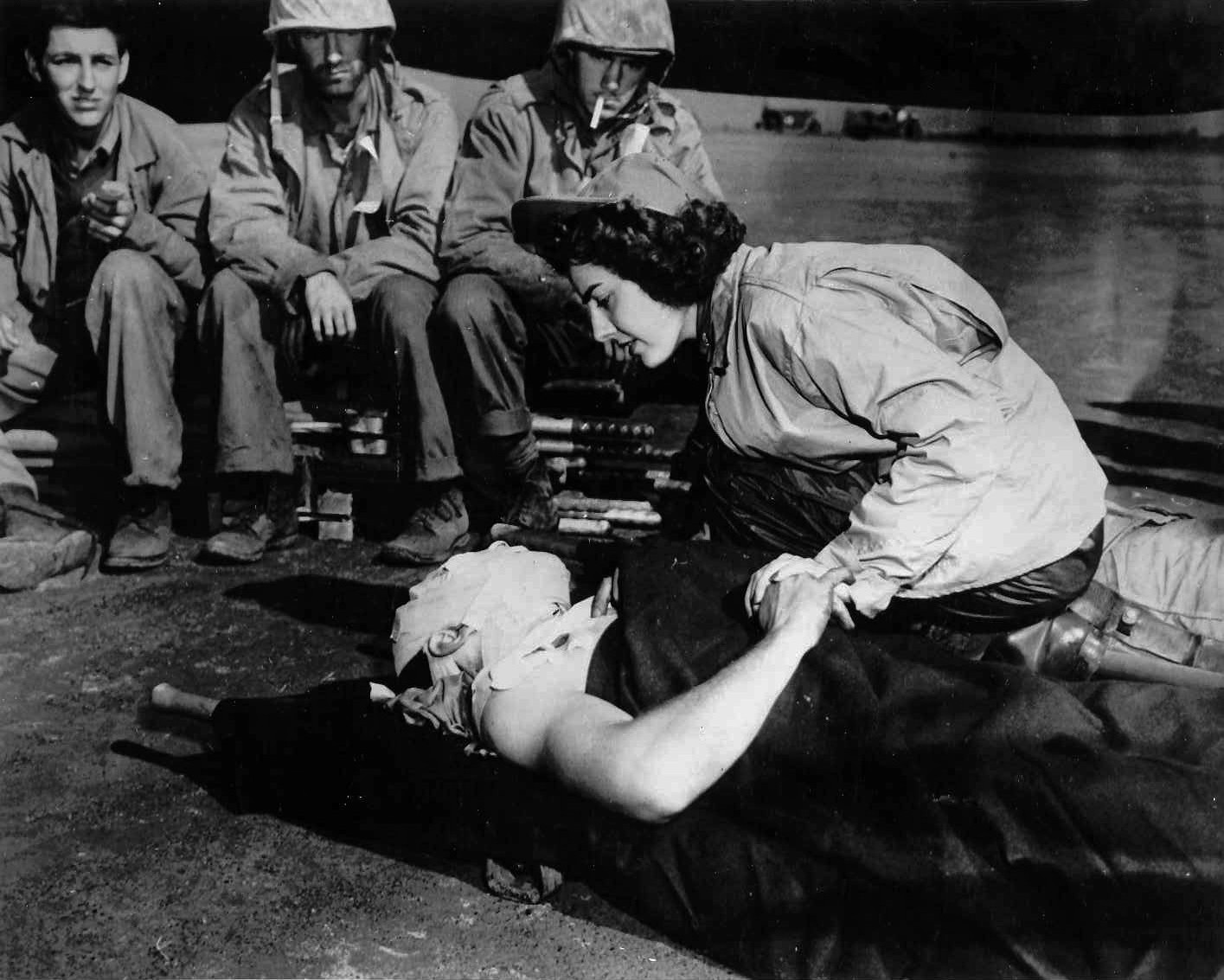
- Born: March 30, 1922; Ohio, US
- Died: July 19, 1987 (aged 65); San Diego, California, US

Jane Kendeigh (March 30, 1922 – July 19, 1987) was a US Navy flight nurse. In 1945 she became the first Navy flight nurse in an active combat zone, serving at Iwo Jima in the Pacific.

Kendeigh was born and raised in Ohio. She attended a nursing school in Cleveland.

== World War II ==
After graduating, Kendeigh joined the first class of US Navy's School of Air Evacuation. It was composed of 24 pharmacist's mates and 24 nurses. They were trained for crash procedures and field survival, particularly in the face of simulated attacks. They were also trained in treating patients in high altitudes. The program included aeromedical physiology, physical conditioning and calisthenics. The program made it possible to rescue wounded soldiers sent to distant lands during the war.

Kendeigh joined the evacuation mission to an active combat zone in the Pacific. She was on board in Naval Air Transport Service R4D with other flight nurses. On March 6, 1945, at 22 years old, Kendeigh was the first flight nurse to land at Iwo Jima. She recalled that some men whistled after witnessing a woman in the combat area. The evacuation mission lasted until March 21, 1945. 2,393 Marines and sailors were rescued and attended to.

When Kendeigh returned to the US, she participated in a war bond drive. Shortly after, she was requested to return to the Pacific. On April 7, 1945, she landed and served at the Battle of Okinawa. She was the first flight nurse to arrive in Okinawa. Kendeigh also served at battlefronts in Marianas and Hawaii.

Flight nurses tended and evacuated 1,176,048 military patients during the war; only 46 died on the journey.

== Death ==
Kendeigh died from cancer on July 19, 1987, in San Diego, California. She was 65 years old.
