= Edna Young =

United States Navy female sailor

Edna E. Young
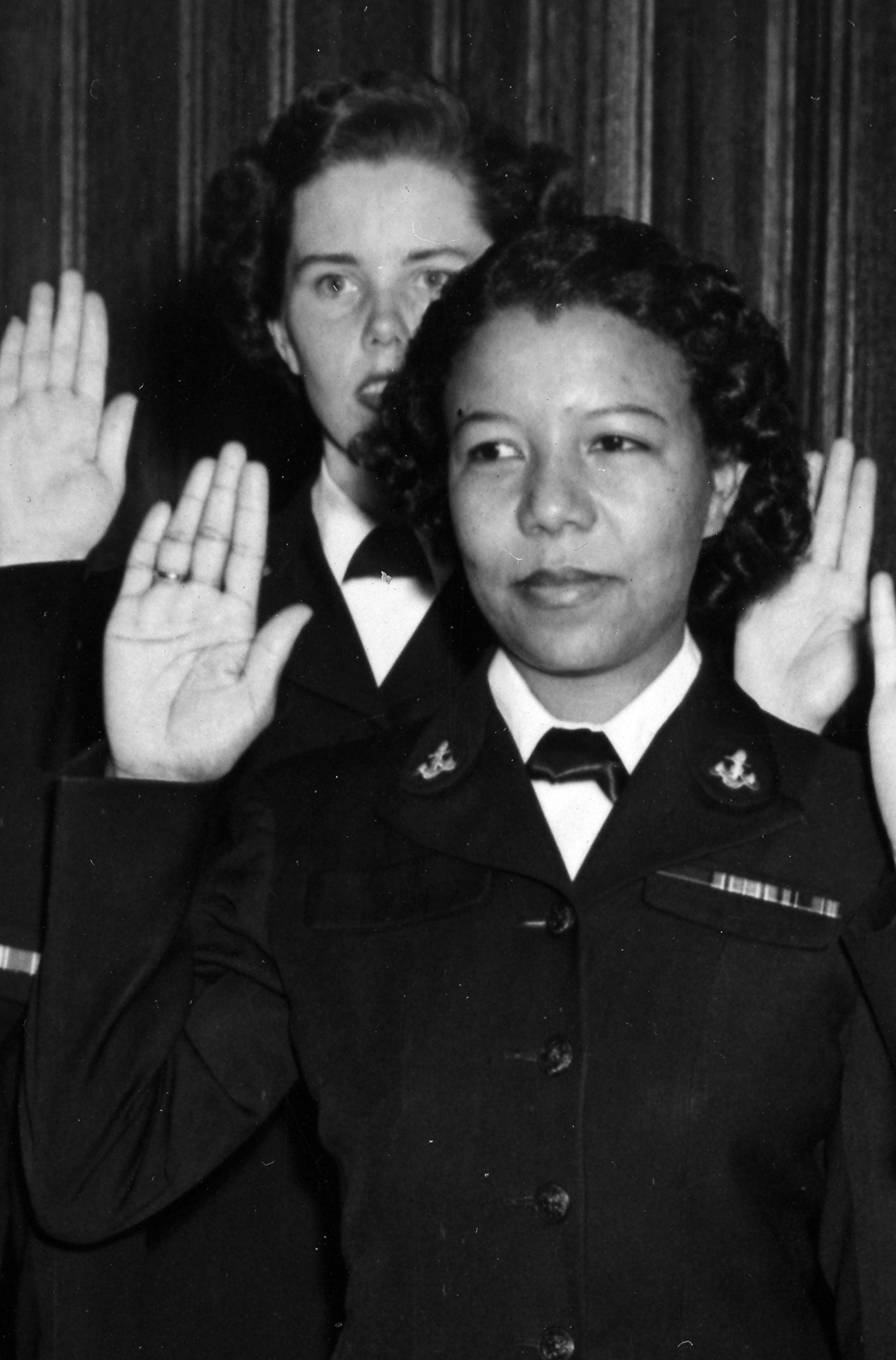
- Edna Young (foreground) at her swearing in, 1948.
- Died: 2012
- Allegiance: United States
- Branch: Navy
- Rank: Chief Petty officer
- Known for: First black woman sworn into the regular US Navy in 1948

Edna Earle Young (reportedly died 2012) was a United States Navy sailor. In 1948, she became one of the first enlisted women, and the first black woman, to be sworn in the Navy. Young later became the first woman in United States Navy history to be promoted to chief petty officer.

== Biography ==
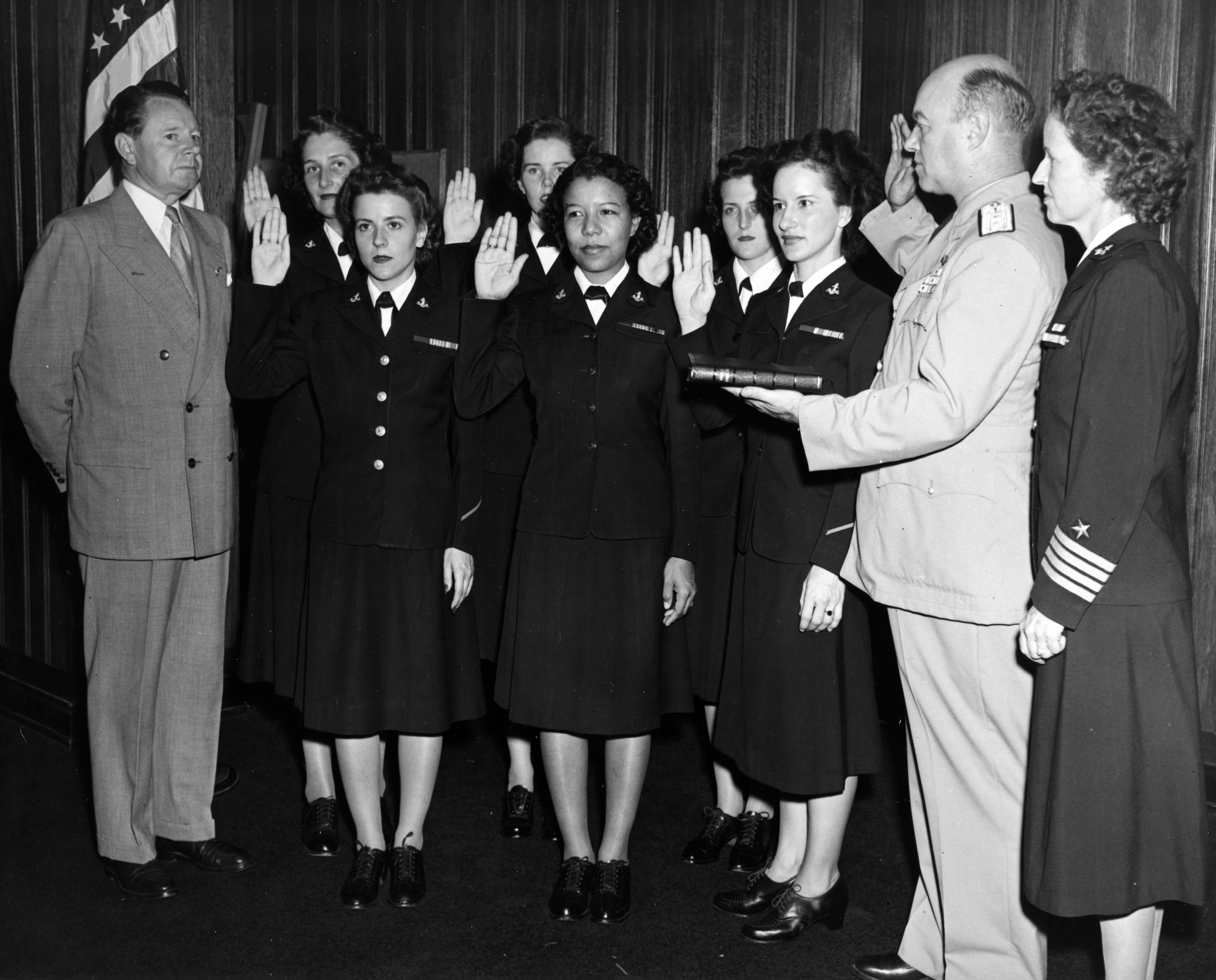
The first six woman to be enlisted in the regular Navy are sworn in on July 7, 1948.

By September 2, 1945, Edna Young enlisted in the Women's Naval Reserve. There, she was a clerical worker, working in dependent benefits.

On July 7, 1948, Yeoman Second Class Young became one of the first six women, and the only black woman out of those six, to be sworn into the regular Navy. She was sworn by Rear Admiral George L. Russell alongside Chief Yeoman Wilma J. Marchal, Hospital Corpsman First Class Ruth Flora, Aviation Storekeeper First Class Kay L. Langen, Storekeeper Second Class Frances T. Devaney, and Teleman Doris R. Robertson. The enlistments marked a new era for the Navy.

Later, Chief Yeoman Young became the first enlisted woman, and first black woman to become chief petty officer.

Young reportedly died in 2012.
