= Women's Overseas Service League =

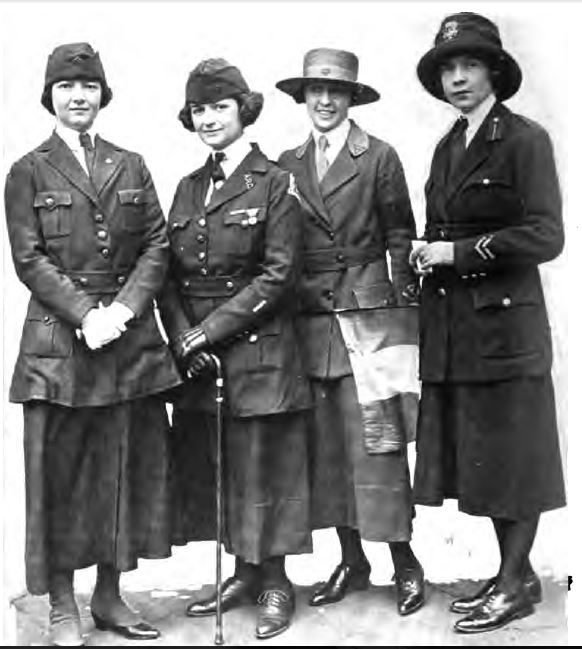
Four members of the American Women Overseas League, Mrs. Douglas Brookman, Mrs Sarah Young, Miss Marion Crocker, Mrs Eugene K. Sturgis, Who's who among the women of California

The Women's Overseas Service League (WOSL) is a non-governmental organization based in the United States. It was founded in May 1921 to provide financial support and relationships for and between servicewomen who returned from World War I to no benefits, unlike their male counterparts.

== History ==
WOSL formed in 1921 when the American Legion expelled female veterans. It applied to Congress for a federal charter, but was denied by the Senate. Members were women who served with the Army, YMCA, YWCA, Red Cross, Salvation Army, Jewish Welfare and other agencies. The women had served in France during World War I as nurses, Signal Corps telephone operators, canteen workers, librarians, and entertainers. Their activities after the war included visiting soldiers in the hospital, supplying them with flowers, books and phonographs as well as arranging occasional entertainment activities.

It started as local groups and then became national. Its first convention was also in 1921 and has been held every single year since, except during World War II (1942–1945). However, women that served in World War II were later added to the WOSL membership in 1946. Membership for the WOSL continued to extend to veterans of other wars into the 1990s. They have a magazine called Carry On. It was the first women's organization to donate to UNICEF and the first to be acknowledged as an accredited observer by the United Nations.

The WOSL has continued to extend their benefits for women that are interested in or currently enlisted in the military, including instating a scholarship program in 1994 that draws in applicants from all over the country. Over the years the WOSL has collected and developed an oral history database complete with interviews that were conducted with women that served overseas. This oral history database is extensive and collection began in San Antonio, Texas.

== Notable members ==
- Kate Brousseau
- Grace Banker
- Merle Egan Anderson
- Amy Robbins Ware
- Helen Douglas Mankin
- Beatrice MacCue Cosgrove
- Faustine Dennis
