= Suresnes American Cemetery and Memorial =

Military cemetery in France

Suresnes American Cemetery
- United States
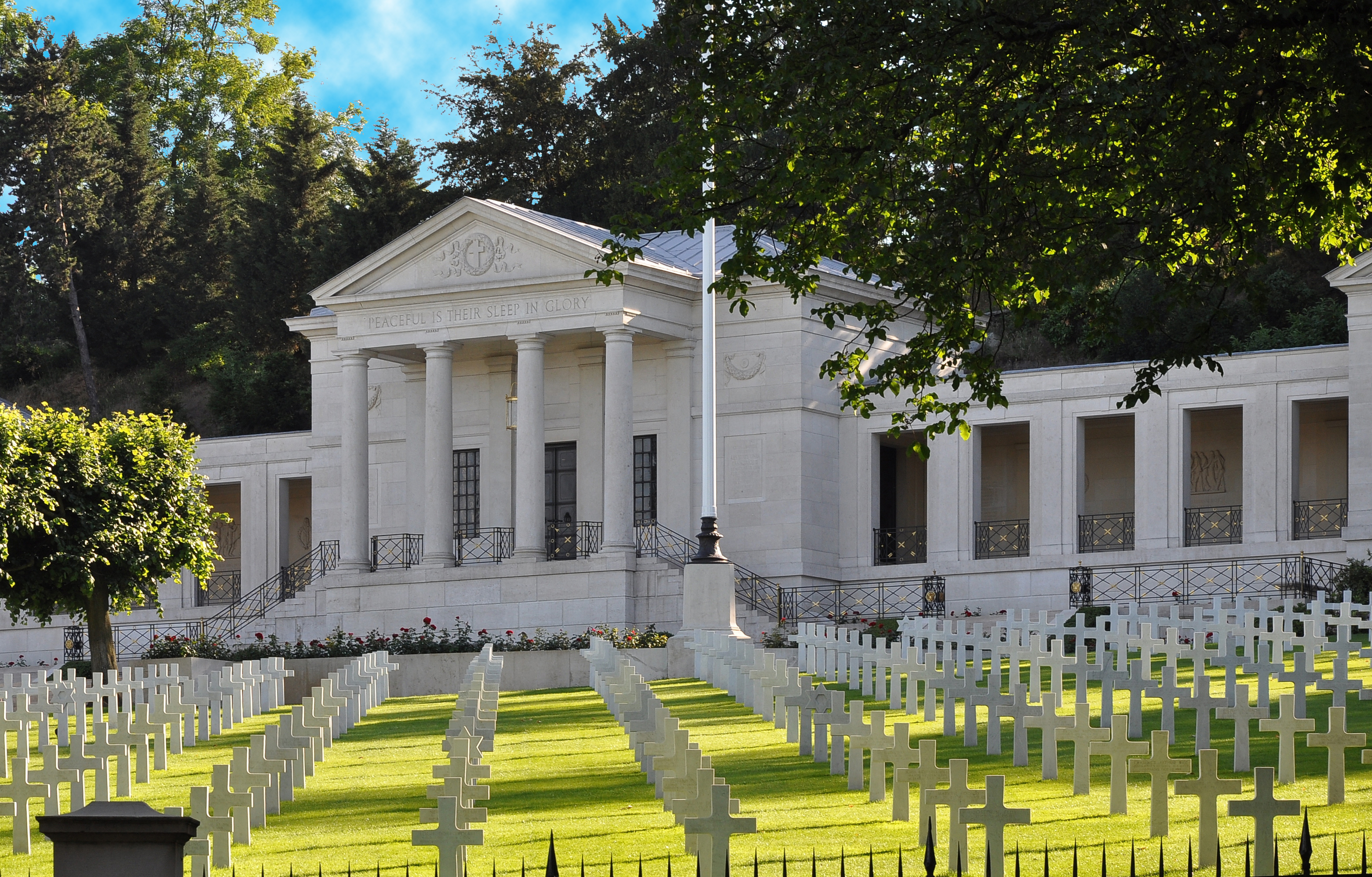
- For the American dead of both World Wars
- Location: 48°52′19″N 02°13′05″E; Suresnes, France
- Designed by: Jacques Gréber (architect); Charles A. Platt (main entrance gate and chapel); Barry Faulkner (mosaics)

The Suresnes American Cemetery (French: Cimetière américain de Suresnes) is a United States military cemetery in Suresnes, Hauts-de-Seine, France. It is the resting place of 1,559 American soldiers killed in World War I and 24 unknown soldiers of World War II. A panoramic view of Paris can be seen from the site, which is located high on the slopes of Mont-Valérien.

== History ==
=== Cemetery ===
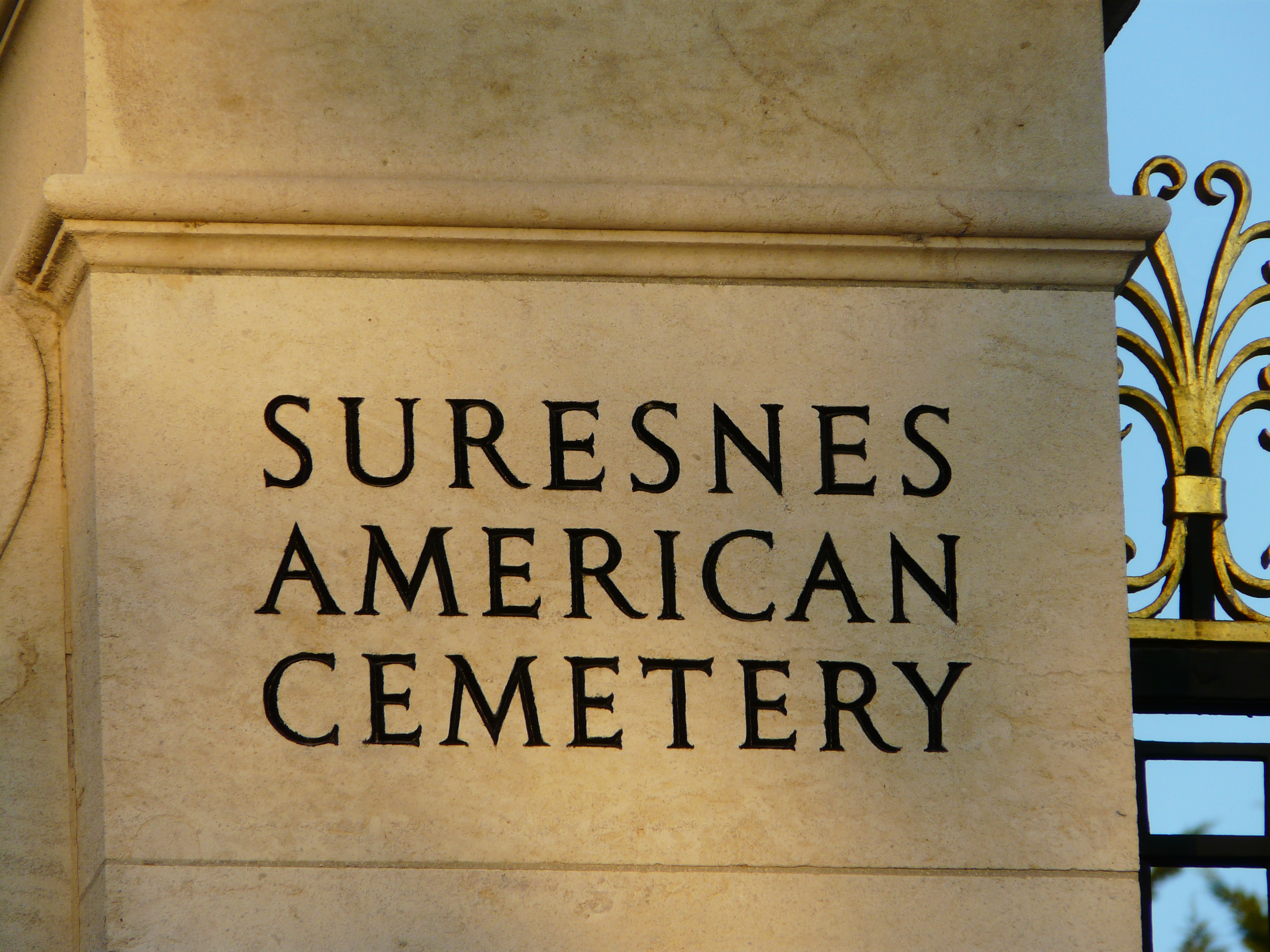
Entrance board

Originally a World War I cemetery, designed in 1922 on Boulevard Washington by French architect Jacques Gréber, Suresnes American Cemetery now shelters the remains of U.S. dead of both World Wars. The 3-hectare (7.4-acre) cemetery contains the remains of 1,559 Americans who died in World War I and 24 unknown dead of World War II. Bronze tablets on the walls of the chapel record the names of 974 World War I missing. Rosettes mark the names of those since recovered and identified.

=== Memorial ===
The World War I memorial chapel was enlarged by the addition of two loggias dedicated to the dead of World Wars I and II, respectively. The expanded memorial was dedicated on September 13, 1952 with Chairman of the American Battle Monuments Commission, George C. Marshall, in attendance. In the rooms at the ends of the loggias are white marble figures in memory of those who lost their lives in the two wars. Inscribed on the loggia walls is a summary of the loss of life in the Armed forces of the United States in each war, together with the location of the overseas commemorative cemeteries where American war dead are buried.

== Notable burials ==
- Inez Crittenden (1887–1918), a leader of the Signal Corps Female Telephone Operators Unit in France in World War I
- Willard Dickerman Straight (1880–1918), U.S. diplomat, investment banker, publisher, reporter and United States Army major

== Gallery ==
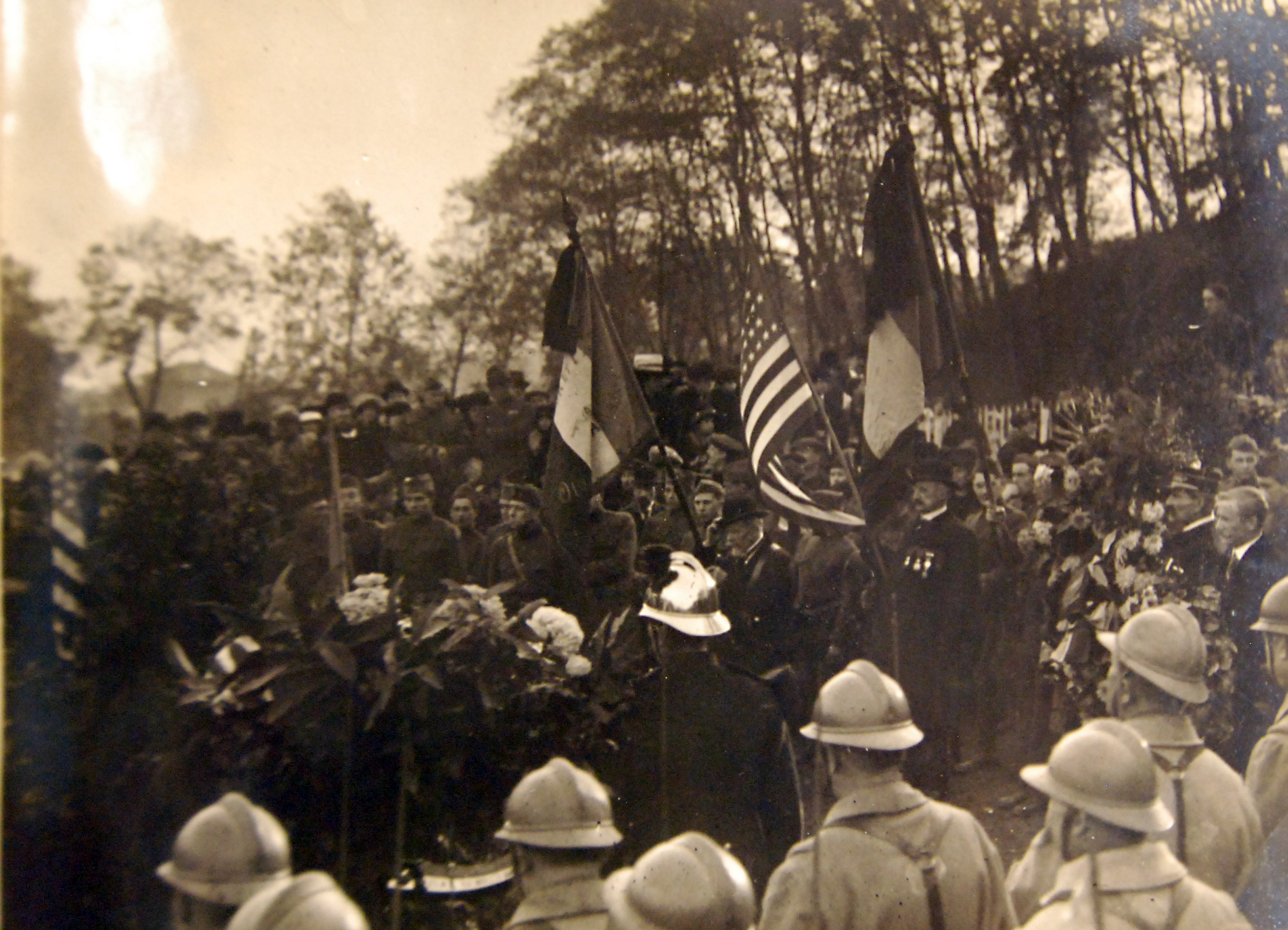
November 1, 1918

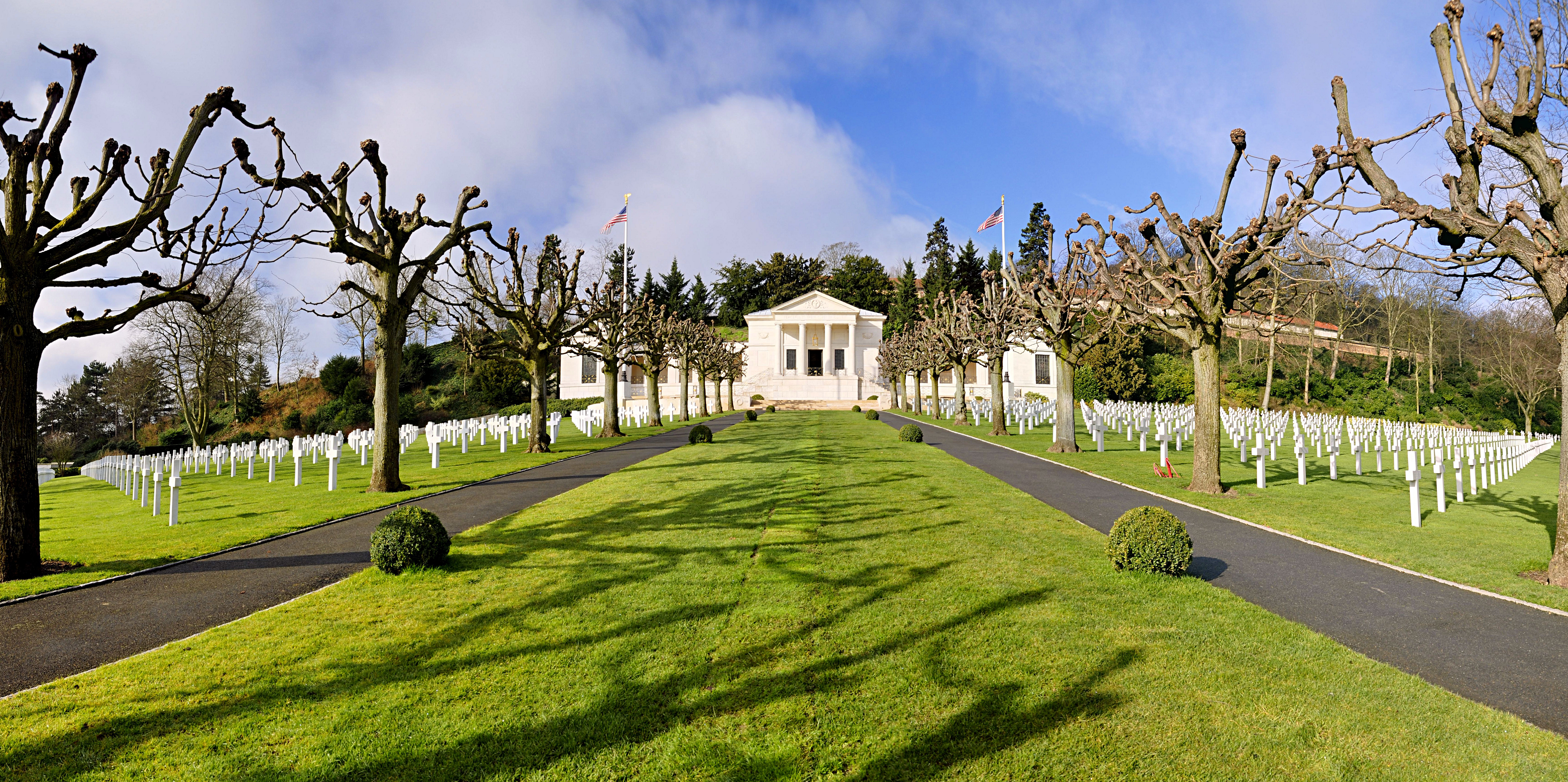
Main avenue

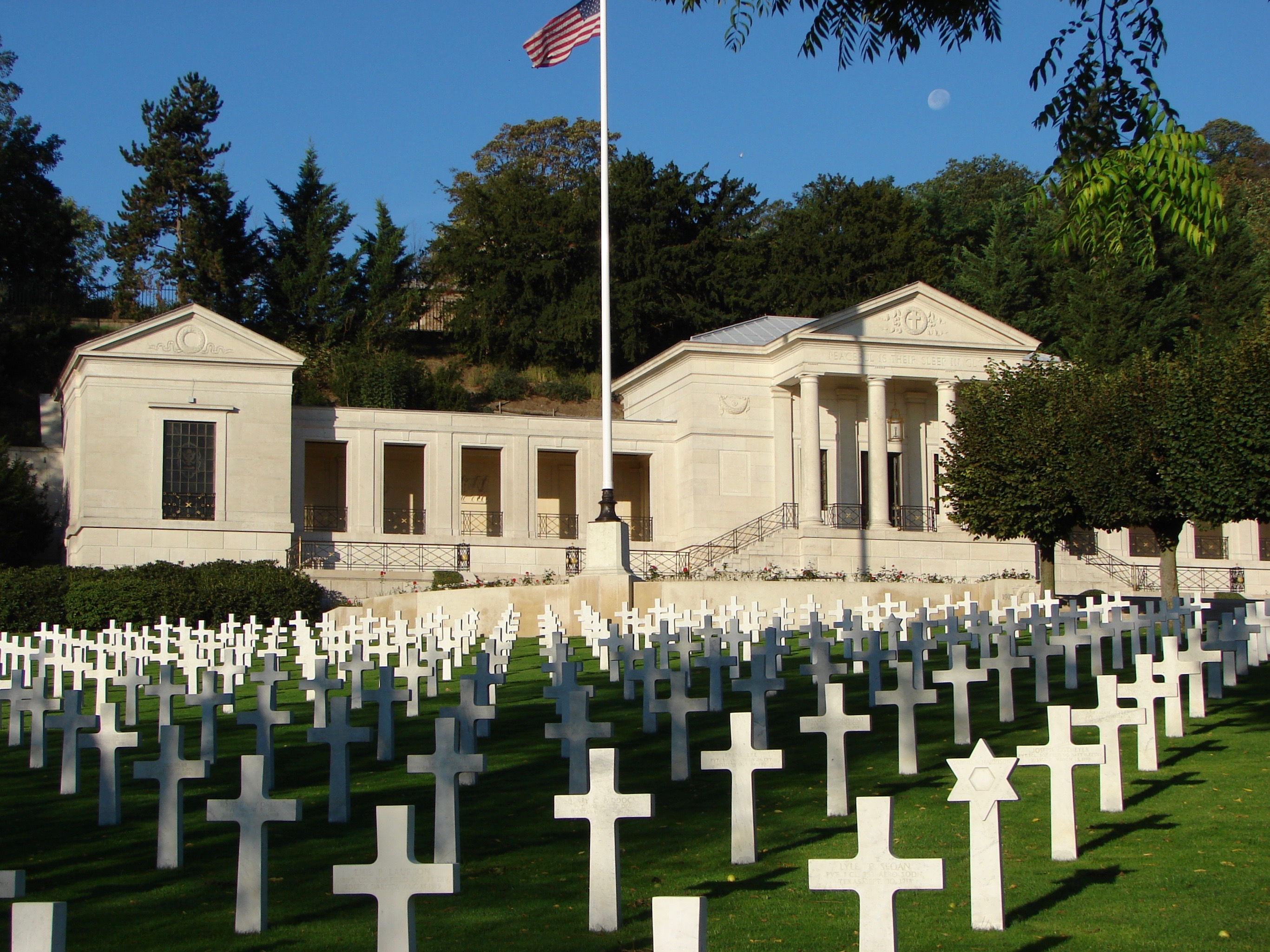
Memorial

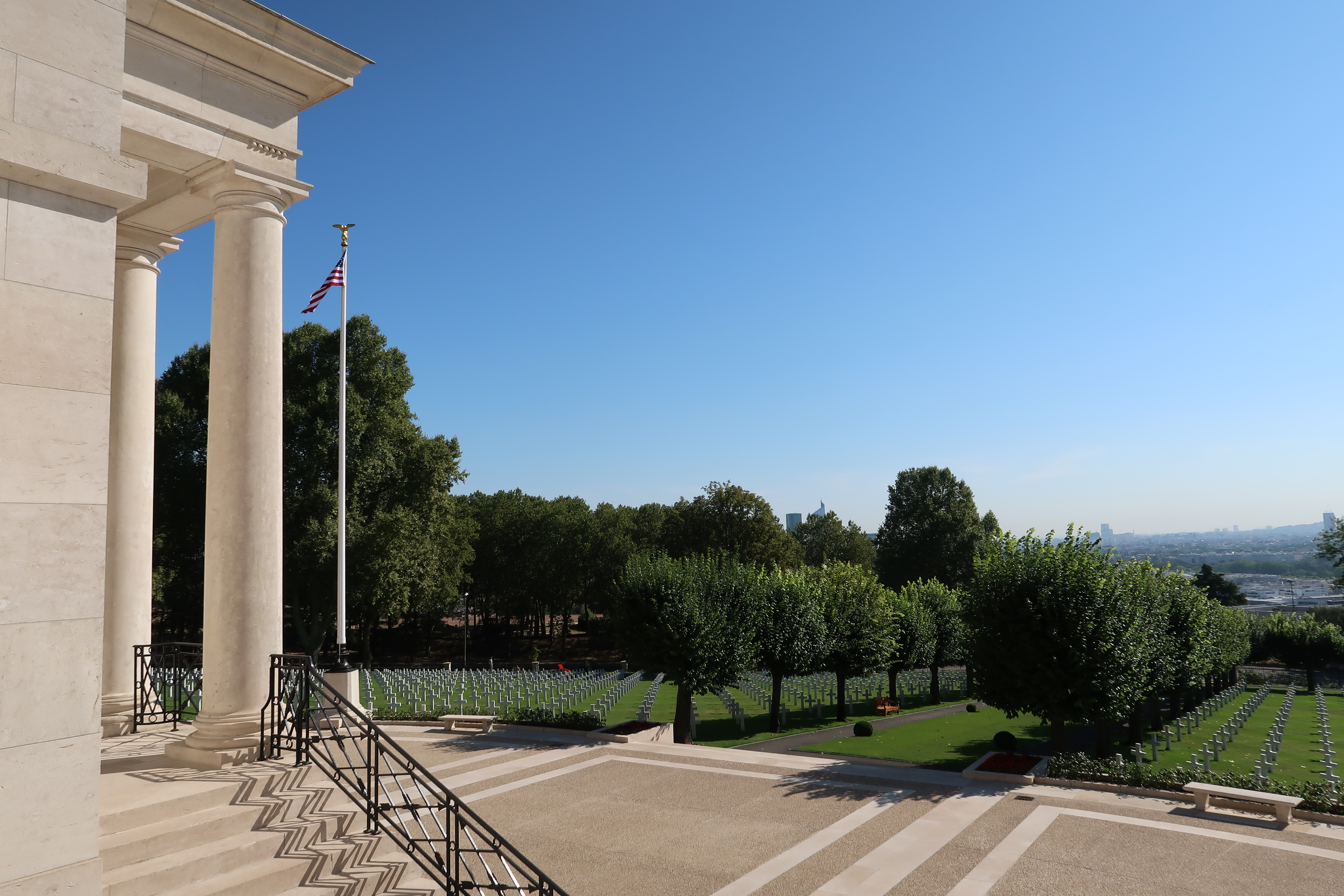
View from the memorial

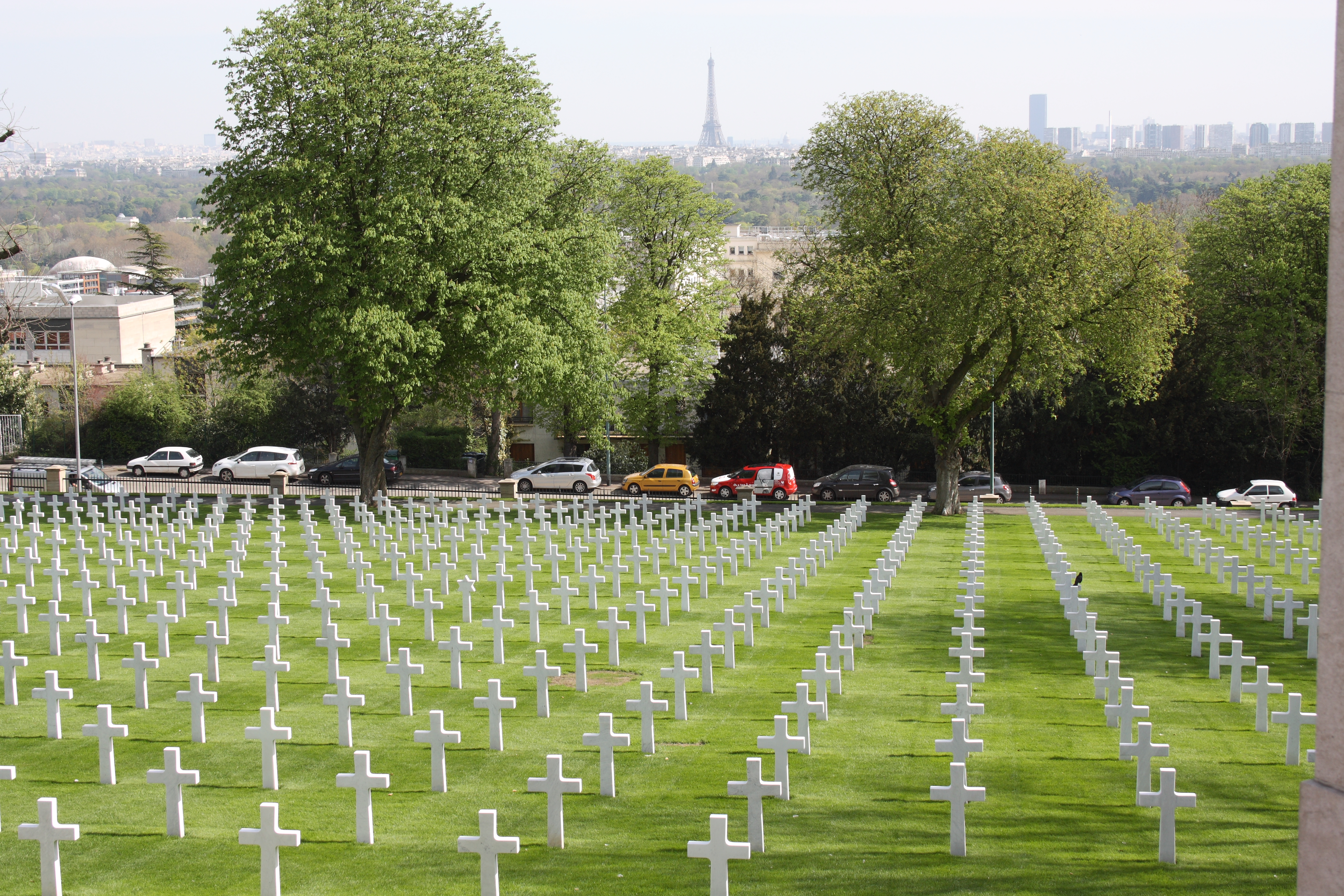
Graves

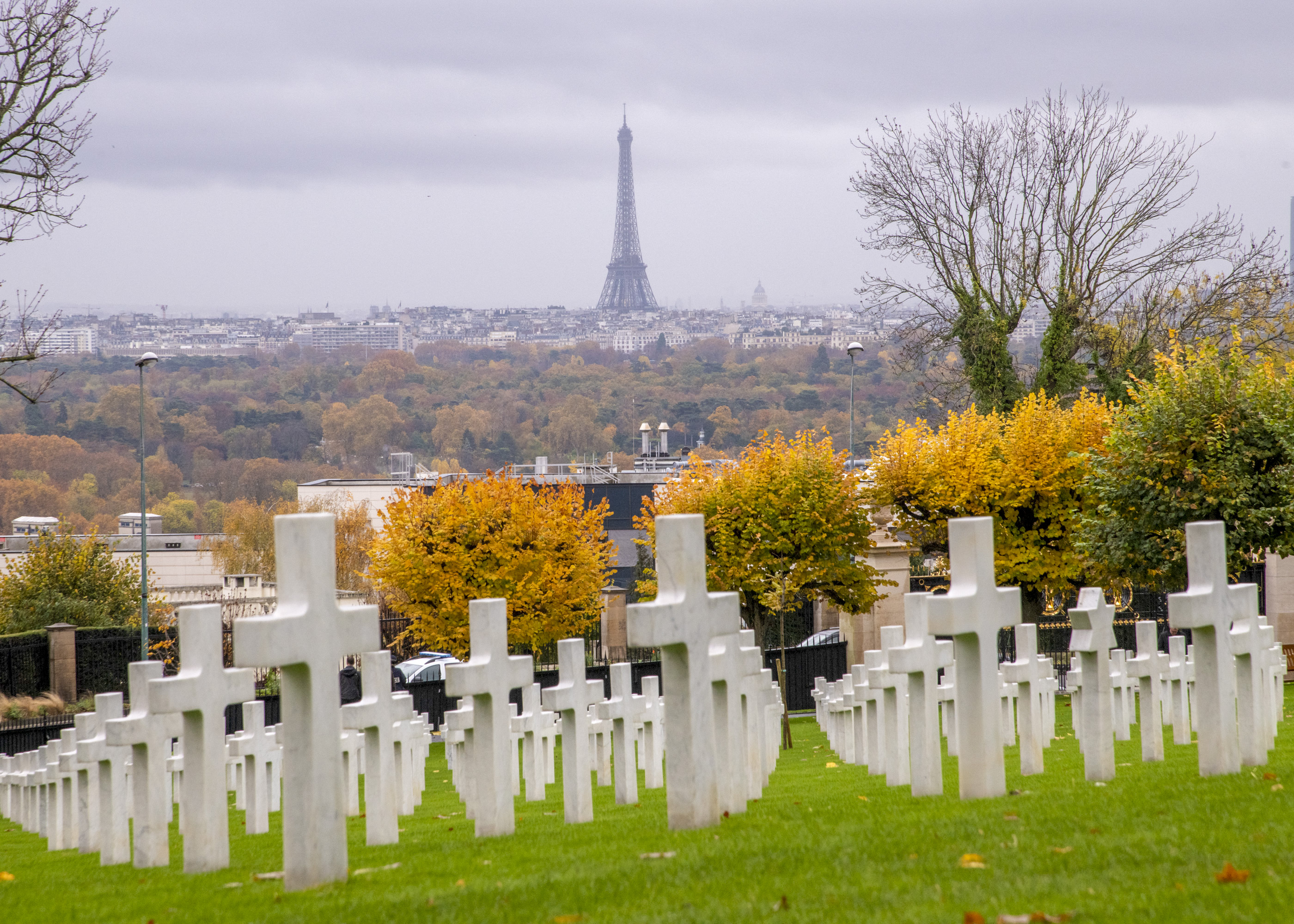
View of Paris

== See also ==
- American Battle Monuments Commission
- World War I memorials
- History of Suresnes
