= Faustine (name) =

Faustine is a personal name, usually but not always feminine. Notable people with the name include:

== Given name ==
- Faustine Bollaert (b. 1979), French journalist
- Faustine Clapier (b. 2001), French fencer
- Faustine Dennis (1888-1975), American librarian
- Faustine Fotso (b. 1965), Cameroonian computer scientist
- Faustine Merret (b. 1978), French windsurfer
- Faustine Mussa (b. 1981), Tanzanian long-distance runner
- Faustine Ndugulile (b. 1969), Tanzanian politician
- Faustine Noël (b. 1993), French para badminton player
- Faustine Pochon, half of the Swiss musical duo BARON.E
- Faustine Robert (b. 1994), French footballer

== Surname ==
- Nona Faustine (b. 1977), American artist

== Other uses ==
- Faustine et le Bel Été (1972 film)
- Faustine, a character in The Invention of Morel (1940 science fiction novel by Adolfo Bioy Casares)

== See also ==
- Faustino
- Faustina
