= Beatrice MacCue =

American singer (1886 – 1955)

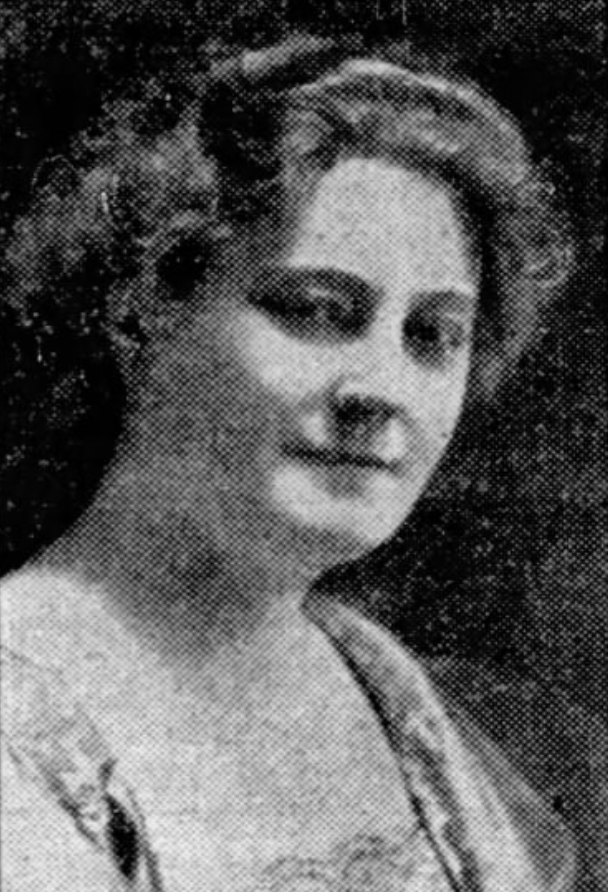
- Beatrice MacCue, from a 1925 publication
- Born: December 18, 1886; Akron, Ohio
- Died: After 1955
- Other names: Beatrice McCue, Beatrice Clifton, Beatrice Cosgrove
- Occupation: Singer

Beatrice A. MacCue Cosgrove (December 18, 1886 – died after 1955), sometimes seen as Beatrice McCue, was an American singer, clubwoman, and voice teacher, most active in the 1920s and 1930s.

== Early life and education ==
Beatrice MacCue was from Akron, Ohio, the daughter of Thomas W. McCue. Her father and older brother were coal dealers; her father was also an inventor. She attended Mount Notre Dame convent school in Cincinnati. Herbert Witherspoon was one of her voice teachers.

== Career ==
MacCue was a contralto. She moved to New York in 1901. She sang at benefit concerts for the American Red Cross during World War I, and toured in France with the YMCA to entertain the troops. She performed at New York's Aeolian Hall in 1920. She taught singing from a studio on Broadway, and performed for radio audiences, sometimes with her students.

MacCue owned a large working farm. In 1917, she donated over 100 jars of currant jelly to the American Red Cross. She was president of the entertainment unit of the Women's Overseas Service League. She was active in the New York chapter of Mu Phi Epsilon. In winters, she taught and performed in Miami.

During World War II, as Beatrice MacCue Cosgrove, she was again active in the Women's Overseas Service League, organizing fundraisers, directing "Bundles for America", a sewing workroom, and sending relief supplies to servicemen and their families. She was also active in the Daughters of Ohio in New York, into the 1950s.

== Publications ==
- "Music in New York City" (1925)

== Personal life ==
MacCue was rescued from an undertow in the ocean off Miami in 1923. She married attorney Hugh Cosgrove in 1935. She died after 1955.
