= Elizabeth Cobbs =

American historian and author (born 1956)

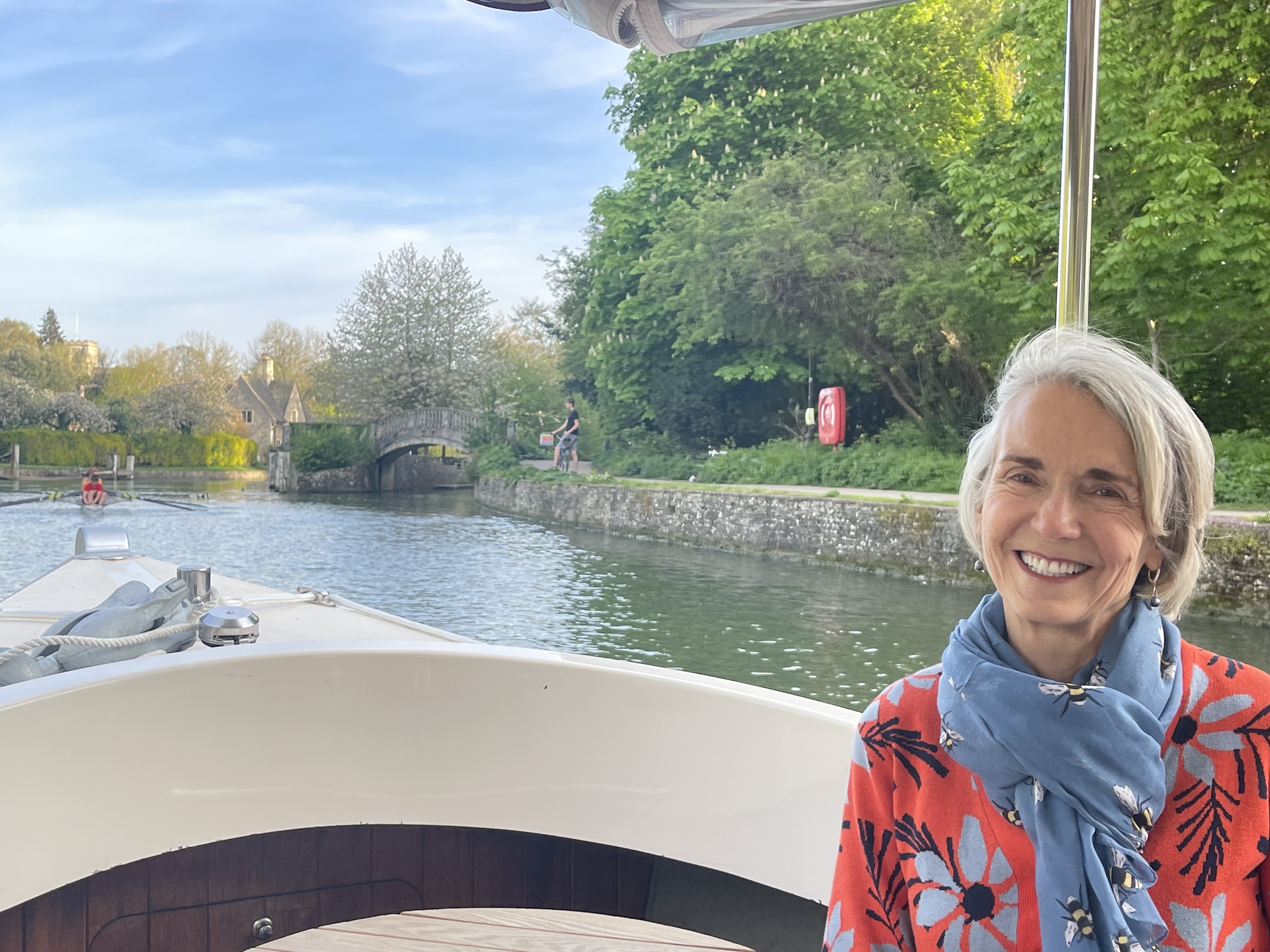
- Cobbs in Oxford in 2023
- Born: July 28, 1956 (age 70); Gardena, California
- Citizenship: American
- Education: University of California, San Diego
- Occupations: Writer, lecturer, historian, professor, producer
- Spouse: James Shelley
- Children: Gregory Shelby and Victoria Shelby
- Writing career
- Language: English
- Years active: 1971–present
- Period: 18th through 21st centuries
- Genres: U.S. and Modern World History
- Subjects: History, Literature/Writing
- Notable works: Fearless Women, The Tubman Command, The Hello Girls, The Hamilton Affair, American Umpire, Broken Promises, The Rich Neighbor Policy, All You Need Is Love, Major Problems in American History
- Notable awards: Allan Nevins Prize, Telly Award, Emmy Award, San Diego Book Award Start Bernath Prize
- Website: elizabethcobbs.com

Elizabeth Cobbs (born July 28, 1956) is an American historian, commentator and author of nine books including three novels, a history textbook and five non-fiction works. She retired from Melbern G. Glasscock Chair in American History at Texas A&M University (2015-2023), following upon a four-decade career in California where she began working for the Center for Women's Studies and Services as a teenager. She writes on the subjects of feminism and human rights, and the history of U.S. foreign relations. She is known for advancing the controversial theory that the United States is not an empire, challenging a common scholarly assumption. She asserts instead that the federal government has played the role of “umpire” at home and abroad since 1776.

She is also credited as a screenwriter on the film adaptation of her book American Umpire, as a producer on the film adaptation of her book The Hello Girls, and as a screenwriter and producer of the public television documentary CyberWork and the American Dream: The History and Future of Work in the Age of Artificial Intelligence.

== Biography ==
Cobbs was born on July 28, 1956 in Gardena, California. Cobbs studied literature at the University of California, San Diego and graduated summa cum laude in 1983. She earned her M.A. and PhD in American History from Stanford University in 1988. While at Stanford, she won the David Potter Award for Outstanding History Graduate Student. Following graduation, she won the Allan Nevins Prize from the Society of American Historians for the Best Dissertation on U.S. History.

She taught nine years at the University of San Diego, becoming chair of the History Department, and then accepted the Dwight E. Stanford Chair in American Foreign Relations at San Diego State University. She has been a Fulbright scholar in Ireland and a Fellow at the Woodrow Wilson International Center for Scholars in Washington D.C and a Senior Fellow of Stanford's Hoover Institution.

Cobbs served on the jury for the Pulitzer Prize in History in 2008. She also served two terms on the Historical Advisory Committee of the US State Department from 1999 to 2006, advising on transparency in government and the declassification of top secret documents and transparency in government.

== Professional background ==
Cobbs started her writing career at the age of 15 as a community organizer and publications coordinator for the Center for Women's Studies and Services in Southern California. During this period, she founded and headed several innovative projects for adults and young people supported partly by the Robert F. Kennedy Memorial. She received the international John D. Rockefeller Youth Award in 1979, at the age of 23 for her services to humanity.

== Books and publications ==
Cobbs has written over 40 articles for media such as The Jerusalem Post, Chicago Tribune, The New York Times, Reuters, China Daily News, National Public Radio, Washington Independent, San Diego Union Tribune, The Washington Post, and several other publications. Her first nonfiction book was The Rich Neighbor Policy; she has since written five more books about American history and politics.

Cobbs also wrote and co-produced the PBS documentary American Umpire which is based on her book of the same name. It explores America's foreign policy "grand strategy" for the next 50 years.

Her first non-fiction book, The Rich Neighbor Policy, claimed the Allan Nevins Prize from the Society of American Historians and also the Bernath Prize from the Society for Historians of American Foreign Relations.

=== The Rich Neighbor Policy: Rockefeller and Kaiser in Brazil ===
Yale University Press published The Rich Neighbor Policy in 1992. The book focuses on the activities of the manufacturing and financial magnates, Henry Kaiser and Nelson Rockefeller, in Brazil. The pair transferred American technology and techniques to enhance the development of Brazil.

=== All You Need Is Love: The Peace Corps and the Spirit of the 1960s ===
Cobbs' second book is based on the people and politics behind the Peace Corps, and discusses themes of American idealism at work during the difficult realities of the second half of the twentieth century. All You Need is Love was published in October 1998.

=== Major Problems in American History, Volumes I and II ===
Major Problems in American History, in two volumes, introduces college undergraduates to the major events and phases of American history. As co-editor with Jon Gjerde and later Edward Blum, Cobbs has edited four editions of the book 2002 (Houghton-Mifflin, Cengage).

=== Broken Promises: A Novel of the Civil War ===
Broken Promises: A Novel of the Civil War was published by Ballantine Books on March 29, 2011, the 150th anniversary of the firing on Fort Sumter. The book won the San Diego Book Award and also Director's Mention for the Langum Prize in American Historical Fiction.

=== American Umpire ===
American Umpire, a reinterpretation of the United States' role in global affairs from 1776 to 2012, was published by Harvard University Press in March 2013.

=== The Hamilton Affair ===
Cobbs' novel The Hamilton Affair was published by Skyhorse Publishing in August 2016. The Hamilton Affair is based on the remarkable lives of Alexander Hamilton and his wife Eliza Schuyler, who survived him following his infamous duel with US vice-president Aaron Burr and raised their surviving seven children alone while helping other impoverished families.

=== The Hello Girls: America's First Women Soldiers ===
Cobbs's The Hello Girls: America's First Women Soldiers was published by Harvard University Press in 2017, the 100th anniversary of the U.S. entry into World War I. The book chronicles the Hello Girls' service in France during World War I with the United States Army Signal Corps and their later battle to receive veterans' benefits for their military service.

=== The Tubman Command ===
Arcade/Skyhorse Publishing released Cobbs' historical novel The Tubman Command in May 2019. The work is a fictional retelling of the 1863 Combahee River Raid on Confederate positions during the Civil War and the role of abolitionist Harriet Tubman in that military operation.

=== Fearless Women: Feminist Patriots from Abigail Adams to Beyoncé ===
Cobbs' Fearless Women: Feminist Patriots from Abigail Adams to Beyoncé was published by Harvard University Press in 2023. It argues that feminism was born in the American Revolution and has driven U.S. history since, influencing not only the global expansion of women's rights, but also the abolition of slavery, the spread of industrialization, the creation of a social safety net, and the doubling of the U.S. economy.

== Awards, grants, and fellowships ==
Elizabeth Cobbs has received two literary prizes for American History and two for fiction. She is the recipient of Director's Mention for the 2009 Langum Prize in American Historical Fiction, the 2009 San Diego Book Award for Broken Promise: A Novel of the Civil War Best Historical Fiction (Winner), the 1993 Stuart L. Bernath Book Prize, SHAFR, for the best first book on the history of U.S. foreign relations (winner).

Cobbs was a Fellow at Stanford's Hoover Institution from 2010 to 2020, held the 2003–2004 Fulbright Distinguished Professorship at University College Dublin, Ireland, the 1997 Bernath Lecture Prize from the Society for Historians of American Foreign Relations (SHAFR), a 1993 Fellowship at the Woodrow Wilson International Center for Scholars, Washington, D.C., and the 1989 Allan Nevins Prize from the Society of American Historians for Best Dissertation on U.S. History: The Rich Neighbor Policy.

=== Film awards ===
Elizabeth Cobbs has received film awards for co-producing or screenwriting three documentaries for public television, including a 2020 Los Angeles Regional Emmy Award for CyberWork and the American Dream, a 2020 Telly Award, Silver Medal, for CyberWork and the American Dream, a 2018 prize in the PBS competition “About Women and Girls Film Festival” for The Hello Girls, a 2018 Best Documentary Feature for CyberWork and the American Dream in the Los Angeles Film Award, Platinum for Best Documentary, and Best Short Documentary for American Umpire in the 2016 San Diego GI Film Festival.

== Op-eds, journal articles, book chapters, and encyclopedia entries ==
- 2018: "Why the Pulitzer Prize committee keeps ignoring women's history," The Washington Post, April 13
- 2017: "'Hello Girls' answered our nation's call," Houston Chronicle, May 27
- 2017: "International Women's Day - American women behind, as usual," The Hill, March 7
- 2017; "Can History Prepare Us for the Trump Presidency?" Politico, January 22
- 2017: "Woodrow Wilson's woman problem, a case study for the Trump era," Los Angeles Times, January 18
- 2016: "Why today's victors don't want the spoils," San Diego Union, September 21
- 2016: "For U.S. foreign policy, it's time to look again at the founding fathers' 'Great Rule'," Los Angeles Times, July 4
- 2016: "Kuwait Showed the Value of Limited Intervention," The New York Times, February 28
- 2016: "Brexit vote has global consequences," San Diego Union, June 11
- 2015: "Why the U.S. Officially 'Believes' Pakistan's bin Laden Story," Reuters, May 20
- 2015: "Why the Letter to Iran Won't End Well for Republicans," Reuters, March 11
- 2015: "Why Boehner's Invite to Netanyahu is Unconstitutional," Reuters, March 2
- 2014: "Metaphor Meets Reality: U.S. and China Are Clearing the Air," Reuters, November 17
- 2014: "Avoid a Classic Blunder: Stay Out of Religious Wars in the Middle East," Reuters, September 16
- 2014: "The Sincerest Form of Flattery: The Peace Corps, The Helsinki Accords, and the Internationalization of Social Values," in Bruce J. Schulman. Making the American Century: Essays on the Political Culture of Twentieth Century America (New York: Oxford, 2014)
- 2014: "Court of Arbitration Could Help Solve Russia-Ukraine Crisis," San Diego Union, (March 26 )
- 2014: "Obama Must Escape the Cold War Syndrome," Chicago Tribune (Reuters). February 21
- 2014: "America's Long Search for Mr. Right," Reuters, February 12
- 2013: "Best Frenemies," Hoover Digest, January, reprinted from "Making Frenemies with Putin," Reuters, September 10
- 2013: "Room for Debate: For U.S., There's An Easy Distinction," The New York Times, September 4
- 2013: "Patriotism: Revolutionaries Were Original Patriots," San Diego Union, June 29
- 2013: "George Washington's Benghazi Blues," Jerusalem Post, May 26
- 2013: "Terrorism: Is American Imperialism Inviting It?" San Jose Mercury, May 3
- 2013: "China as Peacemaker," Reuters, March 27
- 2013: "Room for Debate: China, Japan, and South Korea's Turn," The New York Times, Op-Ed, March 13
- 2013: "Come Home, America," The New York Times, Op-Ed, March 5
- 2013: April 10, Elizabeth Cobbs debate Andrew Bacevich "Umpire or Empire"
- 2011: "Saddle Up for A Wild Western Ride, L'Amour Style," National Public Radio Website, "All Things Considered," May 16
- 2013:' "America's Civil War—and Syria's," San Diego Union, April 10
- 20101: "A Dangerous Neutrality," DisUnion Blog, The New York Times, The Opinion Pages, 12 May
- 2010: "How I Became a Novelist and Lived (Learned) to Tell the Tale," Passport, SHAFR, April 2010: 22–23
- 2008: "The Ties That Bind: Personal Diplomacy in International Relations," Washington Independent, August 29
- 2008: "Spying: A US Psychic Dilemma" Washington Independent, June 20
- 2008: "When Did Talking Go Out of Style?" Washington Independent, June 4
- 2008: "The New Frontier" and "The Peace Corps," in Encyclopedia of the Cold War, Routledge: 626–627, 684–686
- 2006: "Returning to Containment," San Diego Union, March 8
- 2004: "John F. Kennedy and the Problem of Idealism," in John F. Kennedy: A Retrospective Look, Warsaw University Press (Poland): 119–125
- 2003: "The Peace Corps," in Poverty and Social Welfare in America: An Encyclopedia, ed. Gwendolyn Mink, et al., ABC-Clio: 530–531
- 2001: "Nothing Wrong With Teaching What's Right About U.S.," Los Angeles Times, December 30
- 2001: "Decolonization, the Cold War, and the Foreign Policy of the Peace Corps," in Empire and Revolution: The United States and the Third World since 1945. Columbus: Ohio State University, 2001: 123–153
- 2001: "The Assassins Revisited", San Diego Union, October 18
- 2001: The Oxford Companion to United States History, Oxford University Press, entry on "The Peace Corps:" 584
- 1999: "Playing the Role of Warrior and Priest," Los Angeles Times, April 11
- 1998: "Building Nations with the Peace Corps," San Diego Union, April 26
- 1997: "Diplomatic History and the Meaning of Life: Toward a Global American History," Diplomatic History. Fall 1997: 499–518
- 1996: "Decolonization, the Cold War and the Foreign Policy of the Peace Corps" Diplomatic History. Winter 1996: 79–105
- 1991: "U.S. Business: Self-Interest and Neutrality," in Abraham F. Lowenthal, ed., Exporting Democracy: The United States and Latin America. Baltimore: Johns Hopkins University Press, 1991: 264–295
