= Mel Thomas =

American basketball player (born 1985)

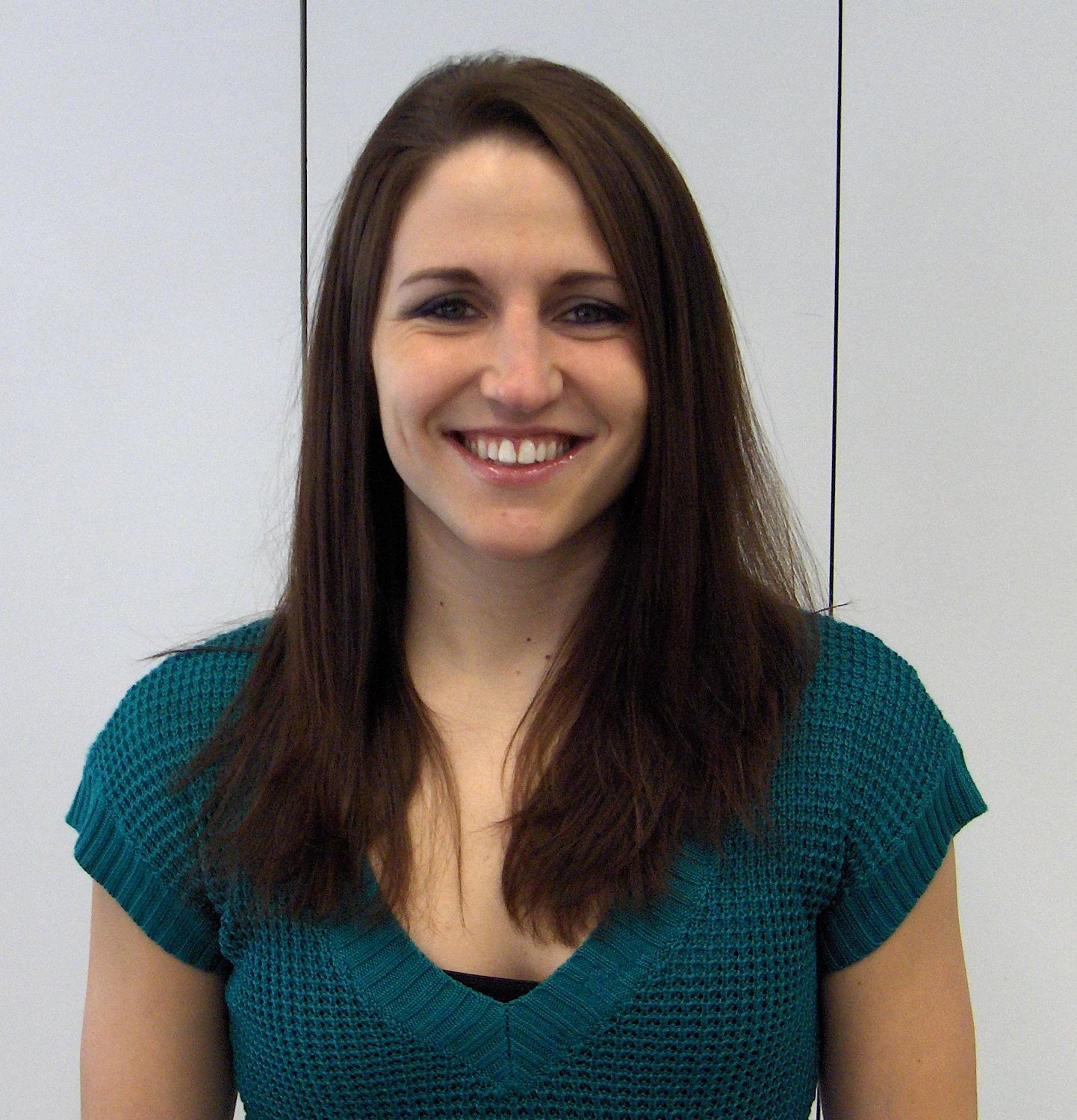
- Mel Thomas

Personal information
- Born: August 26, 1985 (age 41) Cincinnati, Ohio, U.S.
- Listed height: 5 ft 9 in (1.75 m)

Career information
- High school: Mount Notre Dame (Cincinnati, Ohio)
- College: UConn (2004–2008)
- Position: Shooting guard
- Number: 25

Career highlights
- Big East Most Improved Player (2006); McDonald's All-American (2004)
Medals
Women's basketball
Representing United States
Pan American Games
Gold medal – first place	2007 Brazil	Team

Melanie Eileen Thomas (born August 26, 1985 in) is an American basketball player who played for the University of Connecticut Huskies from 2004–2008.

== High school ==
Thomas won many awards during her high school basketball career for Cincinnati’s Mount Notre Dame High School. As a junior, she averaged 18.3 points, 5.2 assists and 3.7 rebounds while leading Mount Notre Dame to a 23–3 mark and a regional finals appearance. As a senior, she led the Cougars to a perfect 28-0 record and a Division I Ohio State Championship. She averaged 20.4 points 5.4 assists and 4.0 rebounds, and made several All America teams. Thomas was named a WBCA All-American, and participated in the 2004 WBCA High School All-America Game.

== College ==
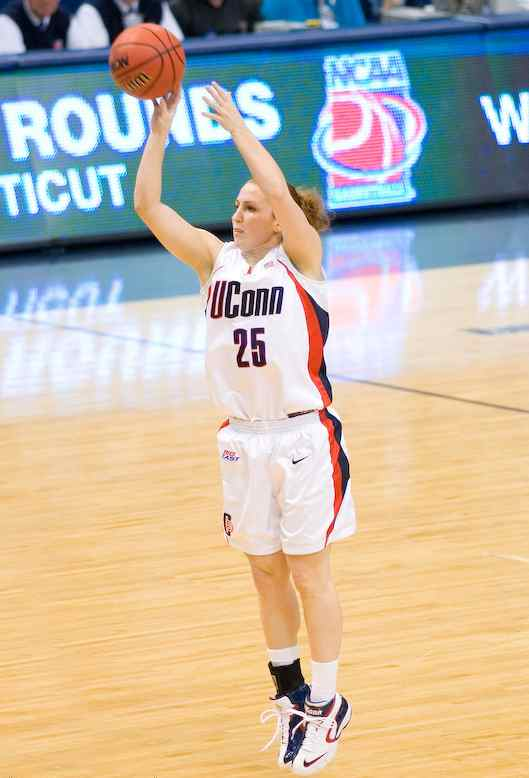
Mel Thomas in Green Bay game

Thomas chose UConn over schools like Duke, Ohio State, and Cincinnati. Thomas struggled during her freshman season. In her sophomore season, she was named the BIG EAST’s Most Improved Player. She started the Huskies' first 28 contests before sitting out the final two games of the regular season with a sprained right ankle, suffered during the Syracuse game on February 2, 2006. The next season (junior) was her breakout season. Thomas started in all 36 games as the Huskies' shooting guard and tallied double-figure points in 16 games, including three 20-plus scoring efforts. She made at least one 3-pointer in 35 of 36 games. In her junior and senior seasons, she co-captained the team with Renee Montgomery. She spent the summer prior to the start of her junior season playing for the USA Pan American Games Team, which became the first U.S. squad to capture the gold medal at the Pan American Games since 1987.

In her senior season, Thomas scored her 1,000th career point against the Virginia Cavaliers on December 5, 2007, in a 75-45 UConn win. Nine games later, her season was cut short due to an ACL injury suffered against Syracuse on January 15, 2008. On January 21, 2008, against the University of North Carolina Tar Heels, Thomas was honored with her 1,000th point ball in front of a sold-out crowd at Gampel Pavilion. While sidelined with the injury during her senior year she wrote in a diary every day, which was later published as a book titled Heart Of A Husky. She finished her UConn career with 1,098 points, and is in the school's Top 5 in total 3pt FG's made with 224.

== Pro career ==
Thomas was hoping to be a second-round pick in the 2008 WNBA Draft, but went undrafted due to an ACL injury. In October 2008, Thomas made it back to the court to play in her first professional basketball game for the Irish League's Waterford Wildcats, scoring 33 points in her first game. Thomas played for the Waterford Wildcats for one season (2008–09). The Seattle Storm of the WNBA added her to their training camp roster in March 2009. During the 2009–10 season she played for Artego Bydgoszcz in the Polish league PLKK.

== Coaching ==
Thomas joined the Florida Gulf Coast women's basketball staff as the director of operations in 2010. She was a member of head coach Karl Smesko's staff for four seasons. During that time, the Eagles won four straight Atlantic Sun Regular-Season Championships, including two trips to the NCAA Tournament.

== Awards ==
- 2003 — Ohio Girls Basketball Magazine Dream Team selection
- 2002 — Adidas Top Ten Camp Underclass All-Star
- 2002 — Street & Smith All-America Honorable Mention
- 2003 — Street & Smith All-America Honorable Mention.
- 2003 — USA Today Super 25 choice
- 2003 — Nike All-American
- 2004 — McDonald’s All-America Team
- 2004 — WBCA All-America Team
- 2004 — Associated Press Ohio Co-Player of the Year
- 2004 — Cincinnati Metro Player of the Year
- 2004 — Ohio Ms. Basketball (2004) awarded by Ohio High School Basketball Coaches Association
- 2006 — Big East Most Improved Player
- 2008 — CoSIDA Women's Basketball Academic All-District I First Team

== University of Connecticut statistics ==
Mel Thomas Statistics at University of Connecticut
Year	G	FG	FGA	PCT	3FG	3FGA	PCT	FT	FTA	PCT	REB	AVG	A	TO	B	S	MIN	PTS	AVG
2004-05	29	54	136	0.397	26	84	0.310	28	42	0.667	56	1.9	54	31	4	20	526	162	5.6
2005-06	35	135	276	0.489	76	177	0.429	46	59	0.780	83	2.4	66	40	6	53	1043	392	11.2
2006-07	36	120	291	0.412	87	205	0.424	51	56	0.911	97	2.7	63	29	4	24	1146	378	10.5
2007-08	16	57	134	0.425	35	89	0.393	17	17	1.000	47	2.9	44	16	0	15	457	166	10.4
Totals	116	366	837	0.437	224	555	0.404	142	174	0.816	283	2.4	227	116	14	112	3172	1098	9.5

== See also ==
- List of Connecticut women's basketball players with 1000 points
