= Inez Crittenden =

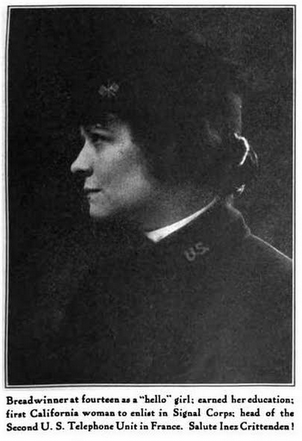
Inez Crittenden, from a 1918 publication.

Inez Ann Murphy Crittenden (1887 – November 11, 1918) was a leader of the "Hello Girls," the U.S. Telephone Corps in France during World War I and died while there.

== Early life ==
Inez Ann Murphy was born in California, the daughter of T. P. Murphy and Emily Murphy. She was originally from San Francisco.

== Career ==
Inez Crittenden worked as a telephone operator in California at age fourteen. She later worked as a secretary to the president of the California Packing Corporation in San Francisco. She was among the first women to join the United States Signal Corps, where her fluent French skills were in demand during World War I. In January 1918, she became Chief Operator, Second American Unit of Telephone Operators, in charge of hundreds of American women who worked as interpreters in war-related telephone communications. She and her unit sailed for France in March 1918. "We were among the first girls to go across, and arrangements were very sketchy in those days," recalled a unit member. Crittenden was soon transferred to work for the public relations bureau at the American Embassy in Paris.

== Personal life ==
Inez Murphy married Nathaniel P. Crittenden of the Crittenden family of Oakland in 1911; they divorced in 1917. She was living with her mother at the time of her appointment to the U. S. Telephone Corps. Inez Crittenden died in Paris on Armistice Day in 1918 from pneumonia, a complication of influenza. She was 31 years old. Her grave is in the Suresnes American Cemetery and Memorial in Suresnes, France. She was given a military funeral, which was unusual for a civilian telephone operator.

Crittenden's ex-husband was wounded in France during the war; his family told newspapers that the two planned to be reunited after the war. Emily Murphy denied these reports.
