= Louise Le Breton =

Veteran of WWI in the American Expeditionary Forces

- Other names: Louise Maxwell

Louise Le Breton (1900–1986) was a Hello Girl, one of the telephone operators who served during World War I (1917–1918) with the American Expeditionary Forces in the U. S. Army Signal Corps.

== Early life ==
She was born in Nantes, France and came to America as a young girl. She started college at the University of California, Berkeley, and would also attend a business school in San Francisco. She joined the French Consulate as a secretary where she helped track the French citizens signing up to help the war effort. She tried to volunteer for positions related to the war effort, but was deemed too young.

== Career ==
In November 1917, the Army was enlisting 100 French-speaking telephone operators. Le Breton and her sister Raymonde sent applications and were accepted. They were asked to report for temporary duty. Le Breton underwent two weeks of training at the San Francisco telephone center.

On February 8, 1917, Le Breton received the telegram that included her orders “Pursuant to the authority of Secretary of War dated 7 April 1917, you will proceed to New York City reporting upon arrival to Mr. M. B. French, American Telephone & Telegraph Co., 195 Broadway. The travel directed is necessary in the Military Service. Transportation allowances are the same as accorded army nurses. You should apply to the nearest quartermaster for transportation. (Signed) Squier, Chief Signal Officer.” Le Breton was a "Hello Girl", one of the bilingual switchboard operators.

Le Breton and her sister joined 25 other women for the same journey. They were part of the First Unit, containing 33 women. February 25, 1918, they boarded the Celtic and set sail for France.

On August 25, 1918, Le Breton was promoted to supervisor and was transferred from Chaumont, Haute-Marne to the headquarters of the First Army and the Advanced Headquarters of the Service of Supplies in Neufchateau, Vosges. Le Breton believed she was enlisted from the very beginning and had said “I look back upon my military service with great pride. I take pleasure in looking at my citations from General Pershing for Meritorious Service as well as a Certificate from the War Department testifying that I rendered faithful and efficient service and all the letters of commendation which I possess.” In 1979, Le Breton and other surviving veteran women were honored by military brass during a special ceremony at the Presidio. During the ceremony they received their honorable discharge which had been denied when they first stop working in the Army. They were also denied military benefits because they were considered civilians since there was no path for women to enlist in the Army. Le Breton had been advocating for many years to have the position of the 'Hello Girls' acknowledged are more than civilian workers. By the time the women were acknowledged as veterans only 18 of the original women could be found.

Le Breton returned to the United States in May 1919, and returned to the University of California to continue her education. She graduated with a degree in French.

She married John Kennedy Maxwell and lived in Berkeley for more than 60 years. Louise helped with "Free France" efforts during World War II and was a member of the Alliance Francaise of the Eastbay.

She died in 1986.
