= Mount Notre Dame High School =

Location
- 711 East Columbia Avenue; Reading, Ohio 45215-3927; United States; 39°13′15″N 84°25′47″W

Information
- Type: Parochial girls secondary school
- Motto: Empowering and Challenging Young Women Since 1860
- Religious affiliation: Roman Catholic
- Established: September 17, 1860
- President: Michelle L. Robinson
- Principal: Karen Day
- Grades: 9–12
- Enrollment: 664 (2023–24)
- Student to teacher ratio: 15.0
- Campus: Suburban
- Colors: Columbia blue and white
- Athletics conference: Girls Greater Cincinnati League
- Mascot: Cougars
- Nickname: MND
- Publication: Developments
- Newspaper: Paw Prints
- Yearbook: Mountain Lore
- Affiliation: Sisters of Notre Dame de Namur
- Website: www.mndhs.org

Mount Notre Dame High School (MND) is a Catholic, college-preparatory high school for young women. The school is affiliated with the Sisters of Notre Dame de Namur as part of the Archdiocese of Cincinnati.

== History ==
Mount Notre Dame traces its origins to the educational work of the Sisters of Notre Dame de Namur in Cincinnati. According to the school, Mount Notre Dame developed from Notre Dame Academy, which operated as a day and boarding school in downtown Cincinnati before the boarding school was moved to Reading, Ohio, in 1860.

The Sisters opened Mount Notre Dame Academy in Reading as a boarding school for girls. Among the academy's early students were Minnie and Rachel Sherman, daughters of Union Army general William Tecumseh Sherman. A day school students joined three decades later. Mount Notre Dame became a diocesan high school in 1956 and continues to be sponsored by the Sisters of Notre Dame de Namur.

== Academics ==
Mount Notre Dame offers courses at college preparatory, honors, Advanced Placement and College Credit Plus levels. The school's course catalog includes Advanced Placement offerings in English, mathematics, science, social studies, world languages, computer science and the arts. The school participates in Ohio's College Credit Plus program, through which eligible students may earn both high school and college credit. Mount Notre Dame offers College Credit Plus coursework in partnership with Cincinnati State Technical and Community College. Through this partnership, students may also complete coursework aligned with the Ohio Transfer 36, a set of general education courses recognized by the State of Ohio for transfer among Ohio public colleges and universities. In 2026, Mount Notre Dame reported that 84 percent of its graduating class earned college credit through College Credit Plus courses available at the school, and that 13 graduates completed 36 or more college credit hours through the Ohio Transfer 36 program.

Mount Notre Dame's My Action Plan (MAP) Program is a four-year student development program focused on goal-setting, leadership, service, and personal growth; it culminates in a senior capstone project and showcase presentation.

Academic Honor Societies include Mu Alpha Theta, National Honor Society, Rho Kappa, and more.

=== Admissions ===
Mount Notre Dame welcomes all young women who desire an education. Admission acceptance is determined by a board of guidance counselors, administrators, and staff who review each application.

MND’s admission process includes an online application. MND will request school records from each applicant’s current school. School records typically include grade reports from 6th, 7th and first quarter/trimester of 8th grade, prior standardized test scores, and copies of any IEP/Accommodation plans.

== Extracurricular activities ==
Mount Notre Dame offers student clubs, organizations, service programs, performing arts, and athletics. Student organizations include academic, cultural, service, spirit, and interest-based clubs. Performing arts offerings include theatre, dance, vocal music, and the MND/Moeller Band program.

== Athletics ==
Mount Notre Dame competes as a member of the Ohio High School Athletic Association and the Girls Greater Catholic League. The school has won state championships in several sports, including basketball, volleyball, soccer, golf, tennis, and swimming. Mount Notre Dame's volleyball program has won ten OHSAA state championships. The basketball program has won eight OHSAA state championships and has made twelve appearances in the state tournament. In the 2020s, Mount Notre Dame added girls flag football as an interscholastic sport. The program won the first Cincinnati girls high school flag football championship hosted by the Cincinnati Bengals in 2024 and finished as runner-up in the inaugural OHSAA girls flag football state championship tournament in 2026.

== Notable alumnae ==
- Rachael Adams, Olympic volleyball player
- KK Bransford, college basketball player and Ohio Ms. Basketball
- Makira Cook, College basketball player
- Debbie Fitz Hayes, health-care executive and president and CEO of The Christ Hospital
- Rebecca Jasontek, Olympic synchronized swimmer
- Rose Lavelle, Soccer player for United States national team
- Beatrice MacCue, contralto singer and clubwoman
- Gabbie Marshall, College basketball player
- Payton Marshall, television news anchor
- Samantha Murphy, Soccer player
- Linda Strite Murnane — retired United States Air Force colonel, military judge, international court administrator, and former Associate Justice of the High Court of the Republic of the Marshall Islands.
- Laila Phelia, College basketball player
- Mel Thomas, College basketball player
