= Merle Egan Anderson =

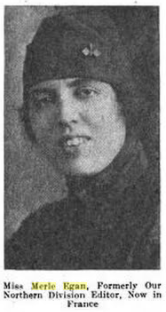
Egan in uniform, 1918

Merle Egan Anderson (born Merle Egan, Smith Center, Kansas c. 1888, died 1986) was a member of the United States Army Signal Corps' Female Telephone Operators Unit during World War I. She is one of the first 447 female veterans of the U.S. Army. She is credited for persisting in the effort to gain the Operators Unit veterans' status, which was eventually signed into law by President Jimmy Carter in 1977.

She worked as a long-distance telephone operator for Mountain States Telephone and Telegraph Company in Helena, Montana. After the war, she married Hal Anderson and moved to Seattle. She had one child, a son who served in the Marine Corps during the Korean War and died in April 1974 while stationed in the Philippines.

== Early life ==
Merle Egan was born in Kansas c.1888. After three years of high school, she started work in 1906 as a toll operator at the Brown Palace Hotel in Denver. She then went to work at a public telephone system in Montana, travelling from town to town to fix problems, and eventually became a traffic supervisor.

== Military service ==
American female switchboard operators in World War I, nicknamed "Hello Girls" and formally known as the Signal Corps Female Telephone Operators Unit, were needed for telephone communications between military units. These switchboard operators were sworn into the U.S. Army Signal Corps.

Egan was not among the first group of women to join the Female Telephone Operators Unit because she was not fluent in French. By the summer of 1918, more American-built circuits had been added to locations in France, reducing reliance on French switchboards. When the Signal Corps relaxed the bilingual requirement for new women recruits, Egan enlisted and sailed to France with the fifth operators unit in August, 1918 on the RMS Aquitania. In France, Egan trained groups of male soldiers to operate magneto switchboards before each group headed to the front. After hostilities ended, Egan operated the telephone exchange for the American Commission to Negotiate Peace at Versailles. She was awarded a special commendation for her work as a Signal Corps operator. Egan's request for discharge was granted in May, 1919.

== Efforts for recognition as veterans ==
Egan campaigned for Congressional recognition of the Signal Corps telephone operators as military veterans for many years. Although multiple bills had been proposed in Congress, none had passed, with objections such as "too much time had passed", "the cost would be prohibitive", and that it would "establish a precedent". Egan actively petitioned government leaders to support the legislative efforts. At age 79, she continued her involvement with the Women's Overseas Service League, serving as the finance chairperson. She corresponded with Hodding Carter, Chet Huntley, and Harold Say, the editor-in-chief of Stars and Stripes who became an advocate for the cause. Her publicity efforts included interviews, speaking to schools, and petitions.

In 1972, Charlotte Gyss Terry, who had also been a telephone operator in France, contacted Egan with information about Army reserve officers who had been sent to Russia in World War I to keep the railways open, but on return in 1920 were told that they had been civilians. When their petitions to Congress were denied, the reserve officers filed a lawsuit, and a federal court ruled in their favor in March, 1971. Terry suggested to Egan that the telephone operators file a similar lawsuit. After Egan gave an interview to the Seattle Times, attorney Mark Hough contacted her to offer his services. Egan also garnered support from the National Organization for Women and the American Civil Liberties Union. Hough investigated the case pro bono for four years and conferred with the attorney for the reservists sent to Russia. In May 1977, the Senate Committee on Veterans Affairs heard evidence from Hough, including statements from Egan and other surviving telephone operators. Hough pointed out the costs of the Russian Railway Service Corps case, which the Army had lost on appeal, with the circuit court finding "Members of the Corps wore regulation Army officer' uniforms and insignia" and that "...the wearing of such uniforms and insignia by non-military personnel is prohibited by law."

Despite opposition by the Army, the Veterans Administration, and even the American Legion, the campaign by Anderson, Hough, and others finally resulted in a bill passing and being signed into law by President Jimmy Carter in November, 1977, officially recognizing the veterans' status of the Signal Corps telephone operators. Egan received her official discharge papers in a ceremony at Fort Lawton, Washington, on August 28, 1979, at age 91.

== See also ==
- American women in World War I
