= Grace Banker =

US Signal Corps personnel

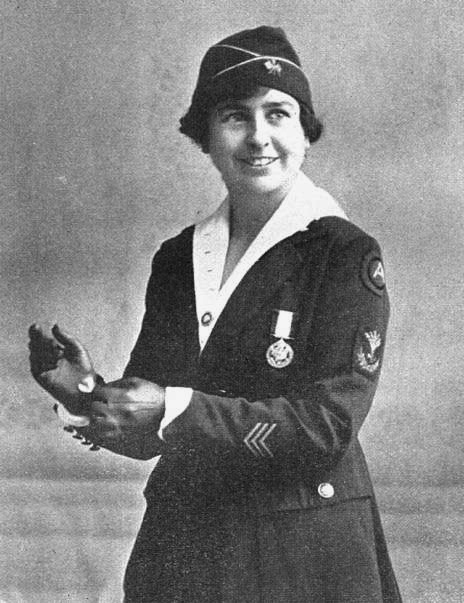
- Born: October 25, 1892; Passaic, New Jersey, United States
- Died: September 17, 1960 (aged 67); Scarsdale, New York
- Education: Barnard College
- Occupation: Civilian mobile operator
- Known for: U.S. Army Signal Corps as a telephone operator of the American Expeditionary Forces (AEF)
- Awards: Distinguished Service Medal

Grace D. Banker (October 25, 1892 – December 17, 1960) was a telephone operator who served during World War I (1917–1918) as chief operator of mobile for the American Expeditionary Forces (AEF) in the U.S. Army Signal Corps. She led thirty-three women telephone operators known popularly as Hello Girls. They were assigned in New York to travel to France to operate telephone switch boards at the war front in Paris, and at Chaumont, Haute-Marne. They also operated the telephone switch boards at First Army headquarters at Ligny-en-Barrois, about 5 miles (8.0 km) to the south of Saint-Mihiel, and later during the Meuse-Argonne Offensive. After her return to civilian life, Banker and her team members were treated as citizen volunteers and initially not given recognition as members of the military. In 1919, Banker was honoured with the Distinguished Service Medal for her services with the First Army headquarters during the St. Mihiel and Meuse-Argonne Offensives, with a commendation.

== Life ==
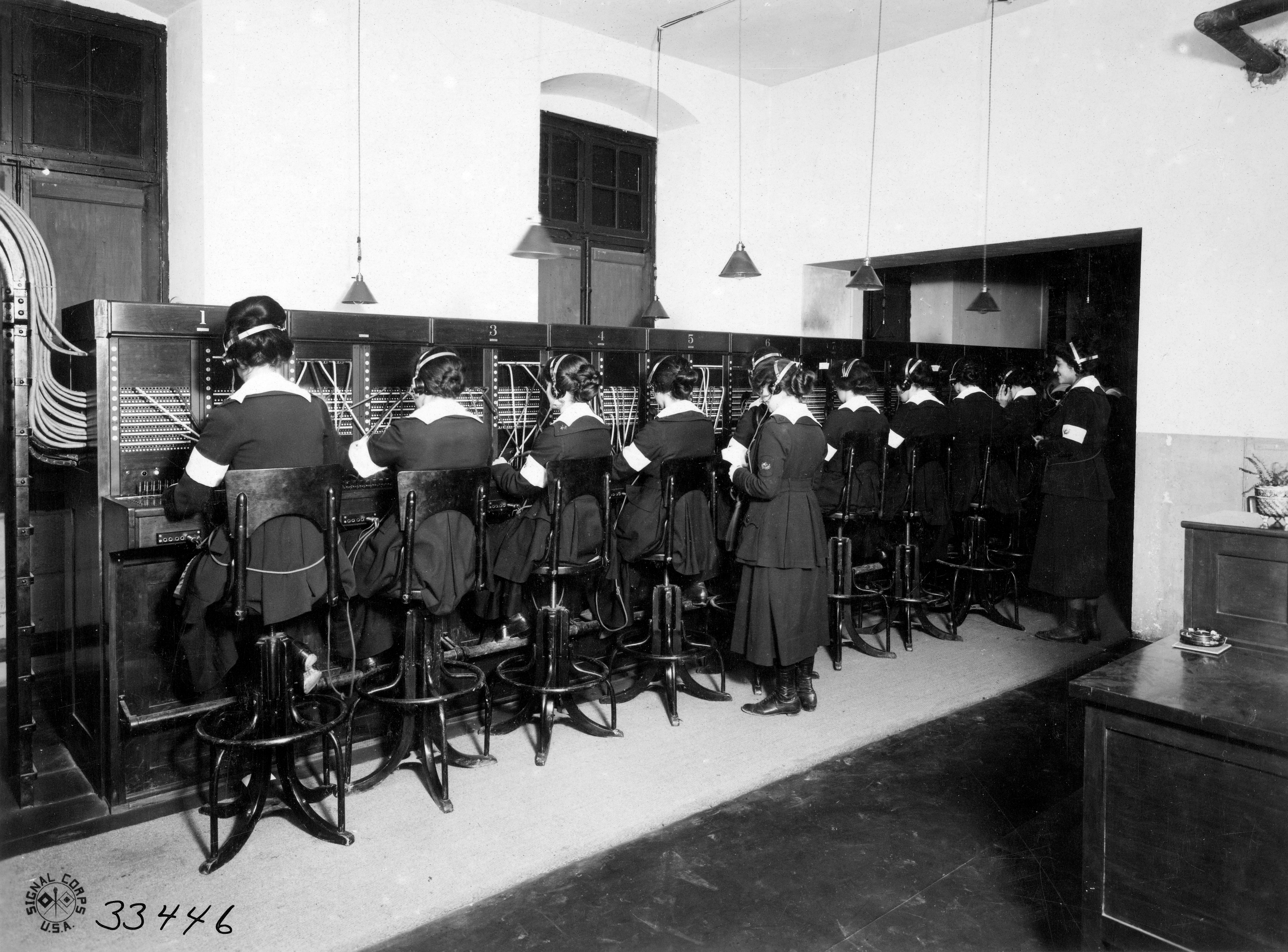
Hello Girls operating switchboards in Chaumont, France during World War I.

Banker was born at Passaic, New Jersey, on 25 October 1892. After graduating from Barnard College she joined American Telephone and Telegraph Company (AT&T) where she worked as a switchboards instructor. During World War I Banker was chosen to head a team of thirty-three telephone operators of Telephone Unit No. 1, for telephone operations, assigned to war duty in France. This was the first group of women who were given the popular name Hello Girls.

Banker sailed with her team members from New Jersey on 6 March 1918, to take up the assignment as chief operator for First Army headquarters in Paris. After arriving with her team in England, the group set sail by ferry across the English Channel. However, bad weather, in the form of thick fog, prevented the ferry from reaching French shores, and it had to be anchored a few miles away to wait for the fog to lift. This location made the vessel an easy target for German bombing (at that time, one vessel out of four had suffered bombing), and the team members remained at full readiness to evacuate the vessel at short notice. The women's group stayed on deck in the open for forty-eight continuous hours. This situation did not dishearten Banker or her team members, and, as Banker later said: "What good sports girls were in that First Unit! They took everything in their stride. They were the pioneers."

On arrival in Paris, Banker and her team were posted to the headquarters of the Advance Section in Chaumont sur Haute Marne, which was then the headquarters of General John J. Pershing. Five months later, Banker was asked to move to the war front, to the First Army headquarters at Ligny-en-Barrois, south of Saint-Mihiel. On 25 August 1918, she moved to the war front with only five operators helping her. For this operation at Saint-Mihiel, Banker had to make a choice of the best operators for the job, she selected: Suzanne Prevot, Esther Fresnel, Helen Hill, Berthe Hunt, and Marie Lange. Equipped with gas masks and helmets, the women operated from trenches where the danger was real; despite this, those not chosen to go felt left out.

During offensive operations at Saint-Mihiel, though artillery bombing was in force, Banker and her team operated the switchboards. When the First Army headquarters moved to Bar-le-Duc in September, Banker and her operators had to work in a place which was damaged extensively. They operated even under heavy bombing by German planes, but no team members were injured. They worked under severe weather conditions without heating, and their barracks leaked, and were later gutted, making conditions even harsher.

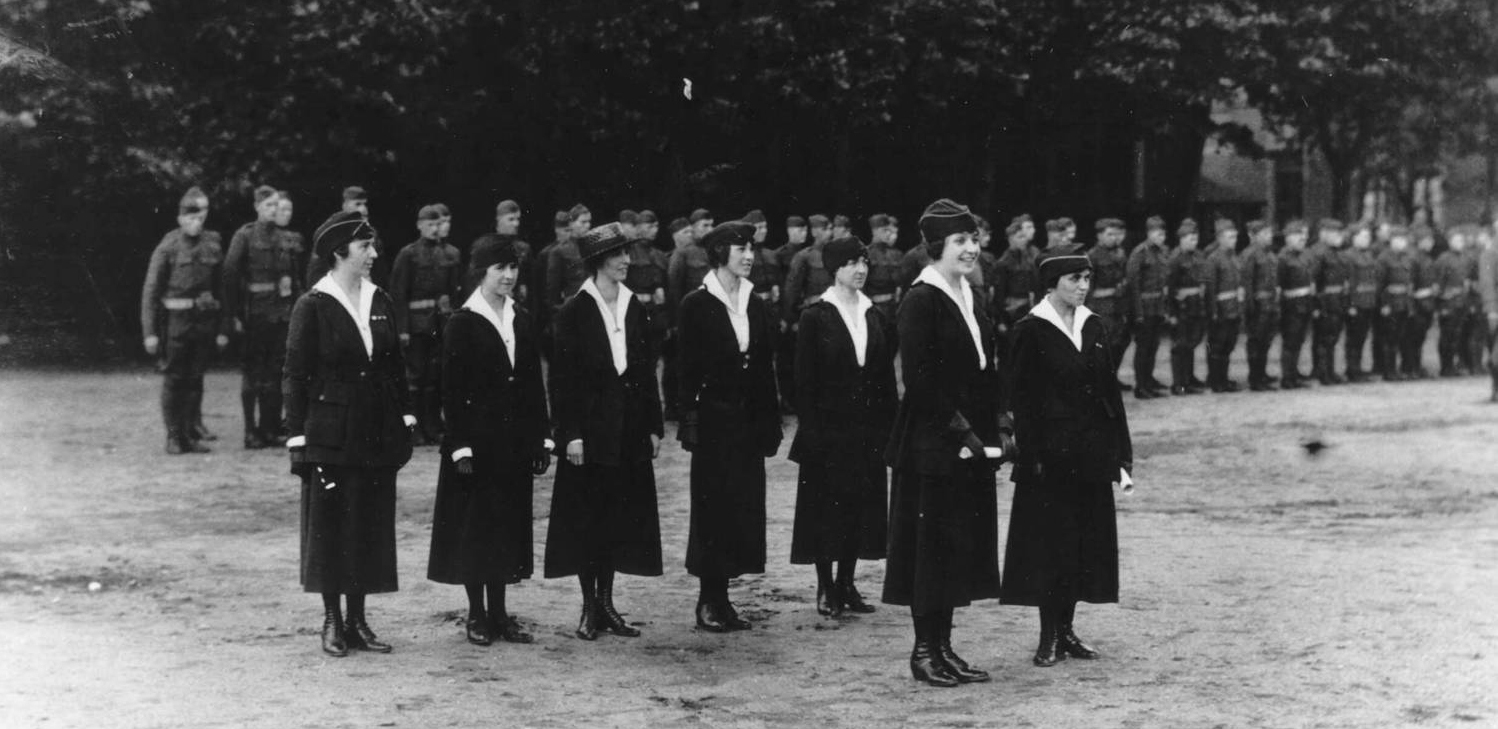
Signal Corps Telephone Girls receive decorations. In the back row, first from left is Grace D. Banker

Following the Armistice of 11 November 1918, fighting ceased. Banker and her team were then ordered to return to Paris. In Paris, Banker was deputed initially to work at the temporary residence of President Woodrow Wilson. As she did not find this job exciting compared to the work at the war front, she accepted an offer to move to the Army of Occupation at Coblenz, Germany; while there she was awarded the Distinguished Service Medal.

After working for twenty months at the war front, in September 1919 Banker and the rest of her team returned home. General Edgar Russel, chief signal officer of the AEF, extolled their service as "indispensable". Reminiscing about her wartime experience as chief operator, Banker humorously noted that "an afternoon in the switchboard office sometimes sounded like a scene from Alice in Wonderland, where only the initiated can make sense of the proceedings". She also noted the confidentiality aspect of her assignment when she was tested by an intelligence officer about her ability to keep a secret, which was about her posting out of the unit. About her work at the war front she said that "the secrecy surrounding their operations gave it an aura of romance and set it apart from the civilian work". After returning from the war front with her team, she reflected: "We missed the First Army with its code of loyalty and hard work. We were back in the petty squabbles of civilian life where even chief operators had 'tantrums' and where the wives of civilians attached to the Peace Conference spilled all over Paris in Army cars."

After the war, when they returned to civilian life, Banker and her team members were treated as citizen volunteers and not recognized as members of the military. They were not given a "formal discharge or even a certificate of service". According to her gravestone, Banker died on 17 December 1960, in Scarsdale, New York. In 1977 Congress enacted legislation that gave due recognition to Banker and her team, and treated them as "veterans".

Banker married Eugene Hiram Paddock, a civil engineer, in May 1922. She is buried with her husband in Green-Wood Cemetery, Brooklyn, New York.

== Awards ==
On May 22, 1919, with Government order no. 70, Banker was awarded the Distinguished Service Medal for her services with the First Army headquarters during the St. Mihiel and Meuse-Argonne Offensives, with the commendation which read: "For exceptional ability... [and] untiring devotion to her exacting duties under trying conditions....to assure the success of the telephone service during the operations of the First Army against the Saint Michel salient and the exertions to the north of Verdun."
