= Faustine Dennis =

American librarian (1888–1975)

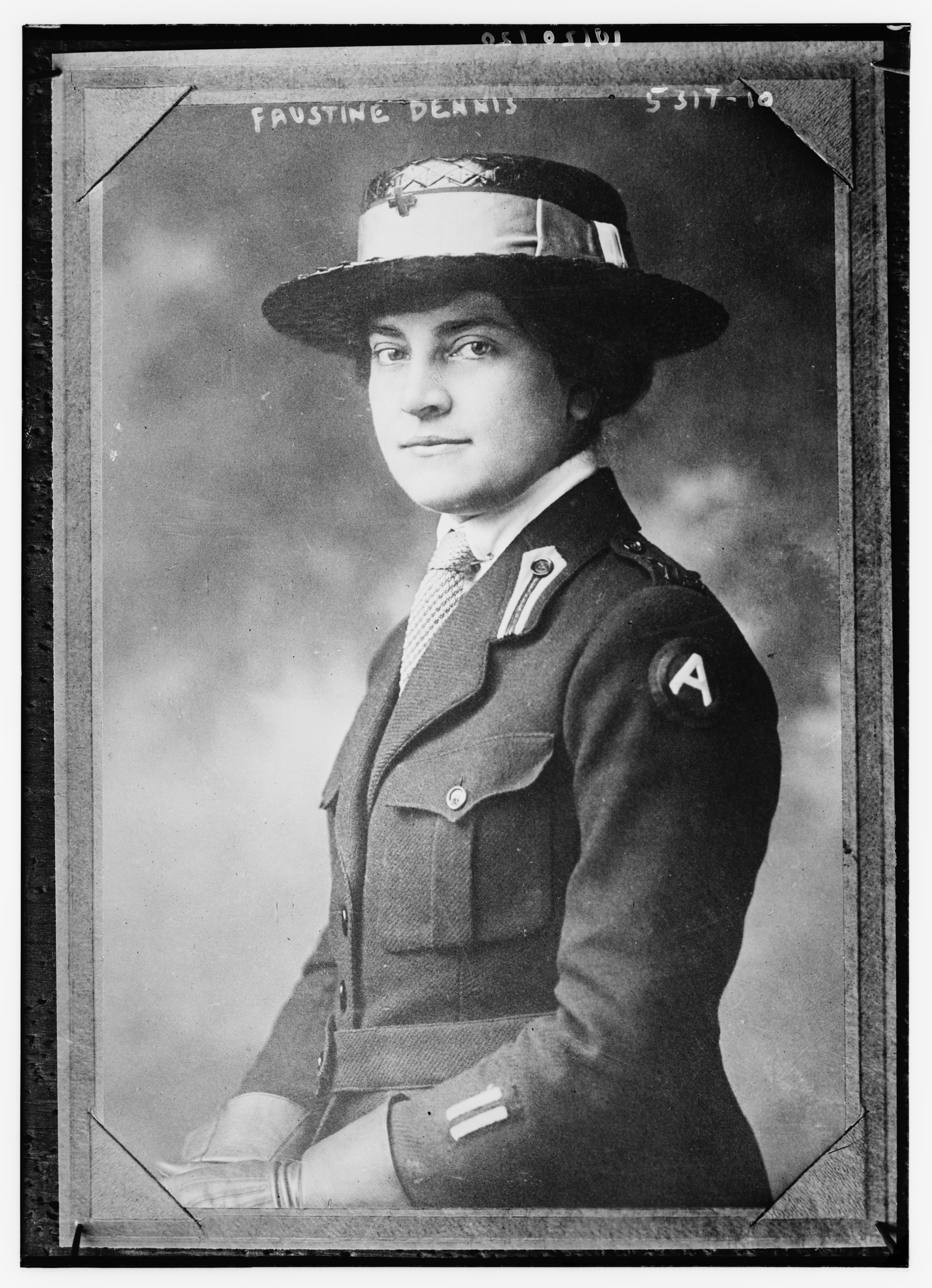
- Faustine Dennis in uniform as a Red Cross worker in World War I, from the Library of Congress
- Born: June 7, 1888; Ithaca, New York
- Died: May 8, 1975 (age 86); Cranford, New Jersey
- Occupation(s): Librarian, clubwoman

Faustine Dennis (June 7, 1888 – May 8, 1975) was an American librarian who worked at the Library of Congress from 1921 to 1950. She volunteered for service during World War I and World War II. She was president of the Women's Overseas Service League from 1933 to 1935, and was state regent of the Daughters of the American Revolution for the District of Columbia in the 1950s.

== Early life and education ==
Dennis was born in Ithaca, New York, the daughter of Louis Monroe Dennis and Minnie Clark Dennis. Her father taught chemistry at Cornell University. She graduated from Vassar College in 1909; she also attended the School of the Museum of Fine Arts in Boston, and the Parsons School of Fine and Applied Arts in New York. After college, she was an interior decorator.

== Career ==
=== Library of Congress ===
Dennis was a librarian who worked at the Library of Congress from 1921 to 1950. She was appointed curator of the Microfilm Reading Room in 1942. She retired in 1955.

=== Military support ===
Dennis served for sixteen months with the American Red Cross in France and Germany during and after World War I. She was national legislative chair of the Women's Overseas Service League (WOSL) from 1929 to 1933, and national president of the WOSL from 1933 to 1935. She was WOSL's legislative chair again in the 1940s. She worked for women's access to services including veterans' hospitals and care homes. In related work, she was a unit president and national defense committee chair of the District of Columbia's American Legion Auxiliary.

During World War II, Dennis was a leader of the casualty shock-feeding teams of the Red Cross Canteen Corps in the District of Columbia, volunteers trained to organize emergency services such as food relief and first aid stations, in a disaster or attack. She was the first woman to be appointed a section chair of the USO.

=== Daughters of the American Revolution ===
Dennis was state regent of the Daughters of the American Revolution (DAR) in the District of Columbia, and national treasurer of the DAR. In 1955, the DAR dedicated "Dennis Grove", a stand of over 200 peach and plum trees at Tamassee, to honor Dennis.

== Publications ==
- "Microfilm Activities" (1944)
- "American Council of Learned Societies, British Manuscripts Project" (1950)
- "Welcome to the Nation's Capital" (1955)

== Personal life ==
Dennis died in 1975, at the age of 86, at a nursing home in Cranford, New Jersey.
