= Hello Girls =

American bilingual female switchboard operators in World War I

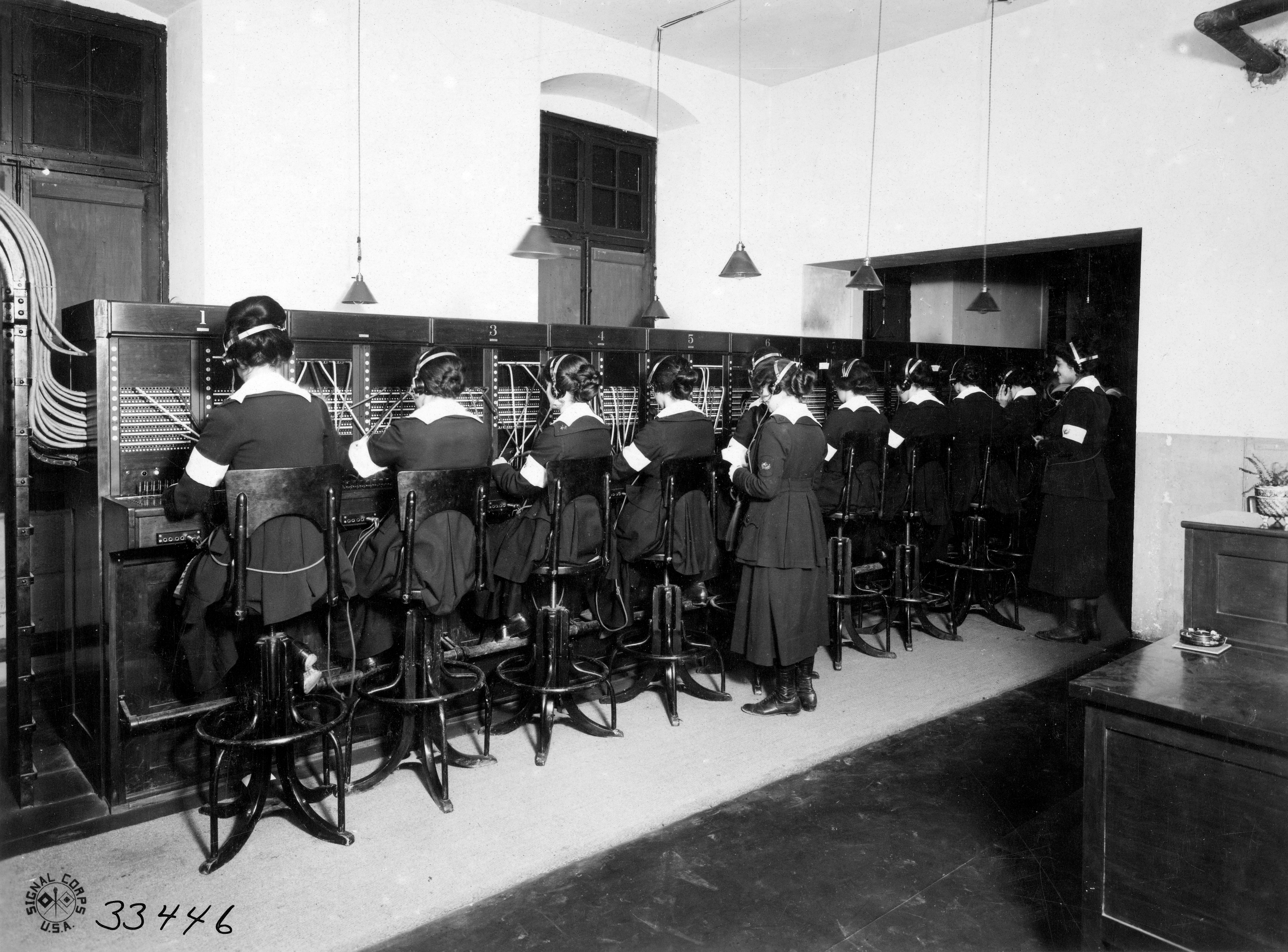
Hello Girls operating switchboards at general headquarters in Chaumont, France (November 5, 1918)

Hello Girls, formally the Signal Corps Female Telephone Operators Unit, were American female switchboard operators in World War I. During the war, these switchboard operators were sworn into the U.S. Army Signal Corps. Until 1977 they were officially categorized as civilian "contract employees" of the US Army. This corps was formed in 1917 from a call by General John J. Pershing to improve the worsening state of communications on the Western front. Early applicants had to be bilingual in English and French to ensure that orders would be understood by anyone. Over 7,000 women applied, but only 450 were accepted. Many of these women were former switchboard operators or employees at telecommunications companies. They completed their Signal Corps training at various sites, including Camp Franklin, now a part of Fort George G. Meade in Maryland.

== History of the term ==
The term "Hello Girls" was coined for female telephone switchboard operators in the US, who greeted callers with "hello" when they signaled to place a call. An early published reference to "hello girls" is in Mark Twain's A Connecticut Yankee in King Arthur's Court written in 1889: "The humblest hello-girl along ten thousand miles of wire could teach gentleness, patience, modesty, manners, to the highest duchess in Arthur's land".

== Service ==
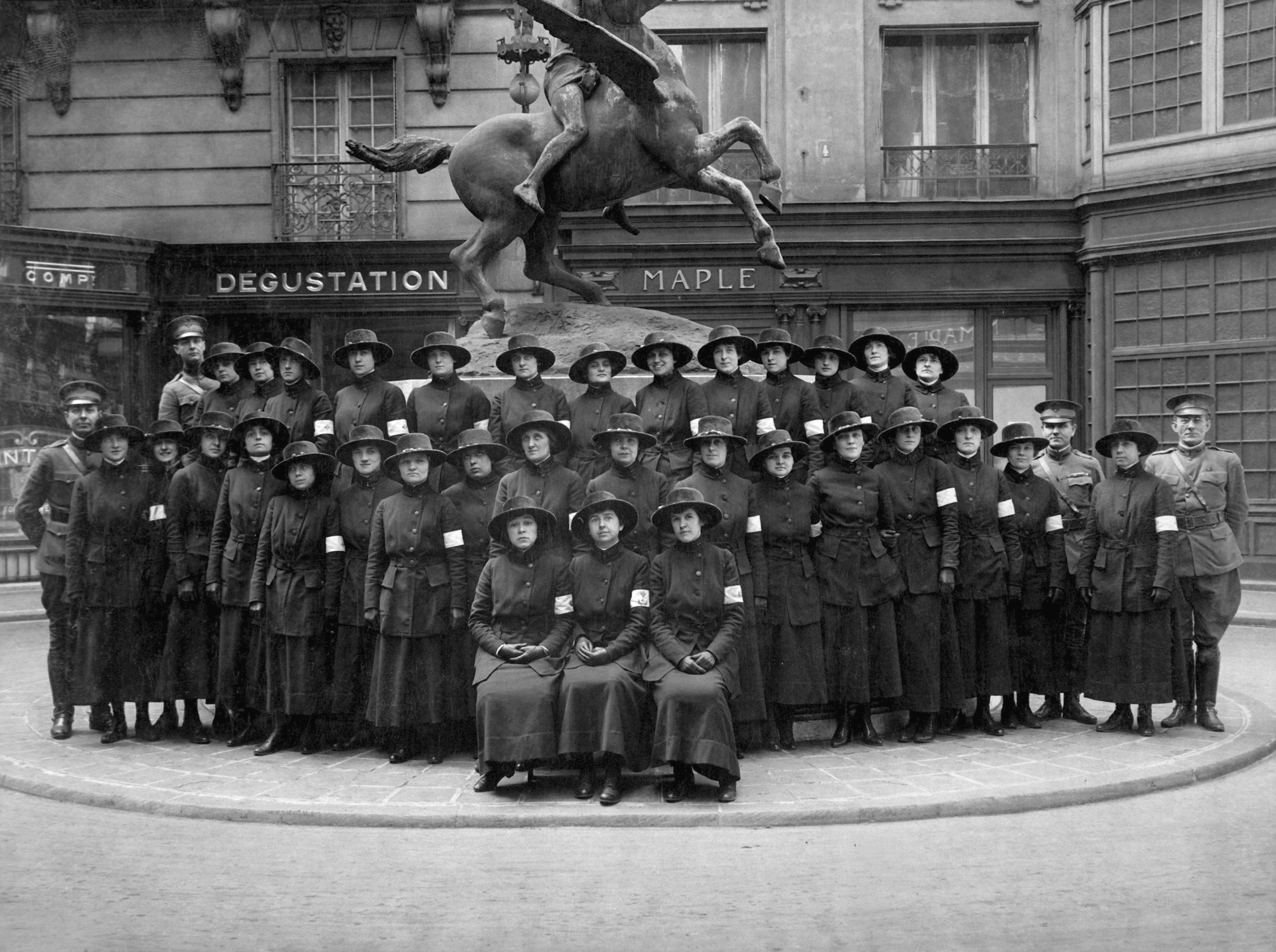
American telephone girls arriving for "hello" duty in France (March 1918}

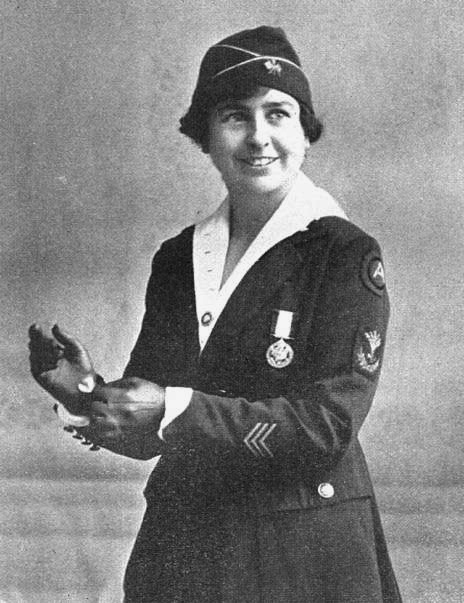
Chief Operator Grace Banker receiving the Distinguished Service Medal

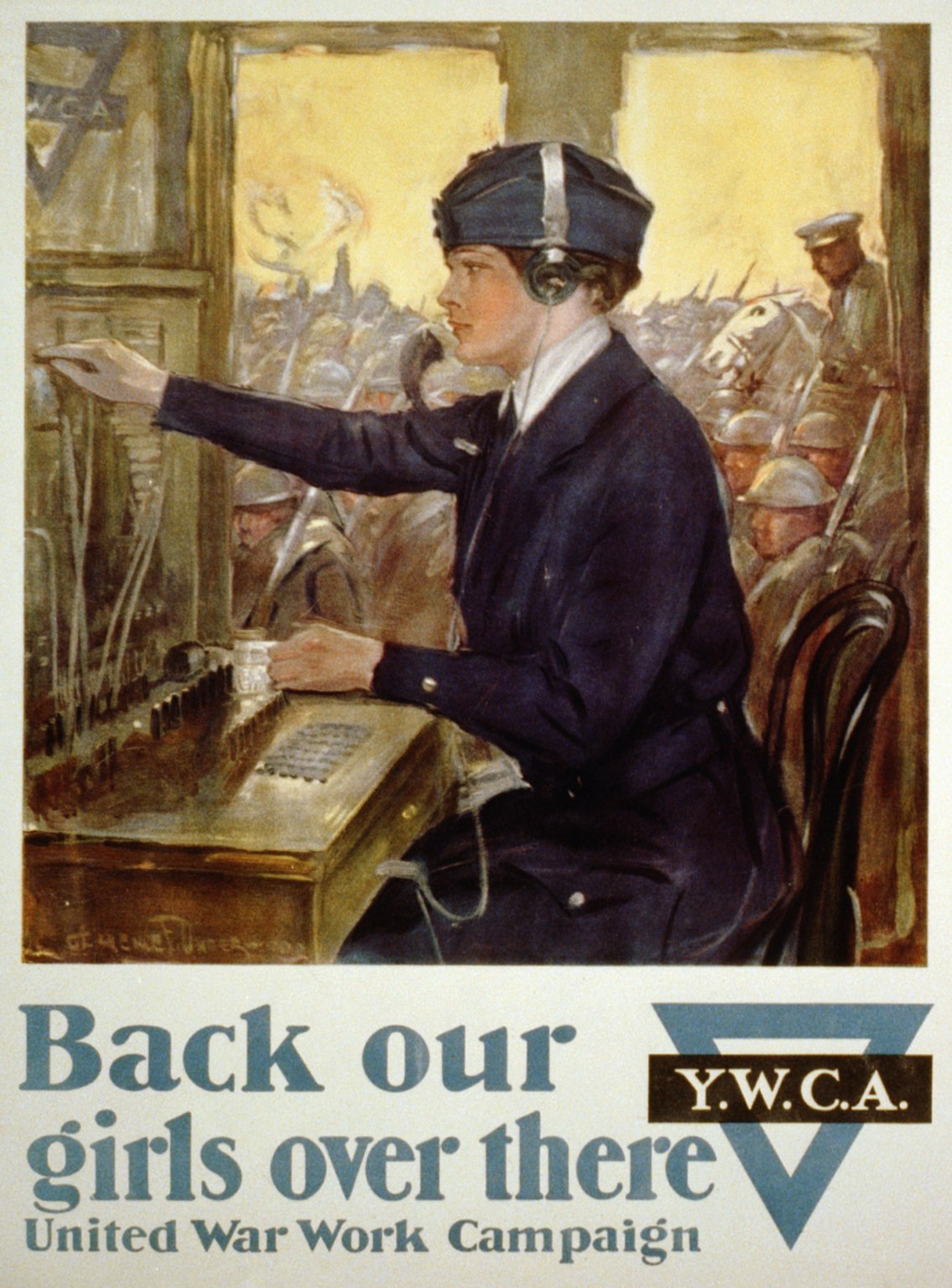
Poster for the United War Work Campaign (November 11–18, 1918)

In September 1917, as male recruits were being shipped to France, the commanders of various Army camps in the continental United States began asking for permission to build facilities to house women telephone operators to maintain their communications. Although the War Department declared that no women should be employed, except nurses attached to hospitals, the Signal Corps and AT&T convinced Secretary of War Newton Baker that the highly trained, experienced women operators were essential. Barracks for women began to be built in October. To assuage public concern, Baker permitted women to be hired only when men were unavailable. He then ordered that the women be under constant supervision, and that they must be "of mature age and high moral character".

The communication difficulties in France, due to a shortage of switchboard operators and the language differences, frustrated Pershing. Several officers in the Signal Corps proposed that they recruit bilingual American women. Agreeing, Pershing sent a November 8, 1917, cable:

On account of the great difficulty of obtaining properly qualified men, request organization and dispatch to France a force of Woman telephone operators all speaking French and English equally well.

The initial staffing requirements, specified by Pershing, were three chief operators, nine supervising operators, 78 local and long-distance operators, 10 substitutes, and one man (a commissioned captain) to generally supervise traffic. Pershing was aware of the contributions women had made to the war front and had even called on female clerical workers to serve so that more men could be moved to the Front. Recruiting focused on fluency in French, as that was presumed to be the more difficult qualification to meet. AT&T offered to provide telephone operating training to bilingual recruits who lacked switchboard experience.

Most of the women who served ended up being from urban areas of the United States and Canada where there was more access to this technology. These women were mostly single, well educated, and independent. The average age of employment was 26, which was young for the time, but most had worked previous jobs and many had at least one foreign-born parent. Finally, they had all proclaimed the spirit of patriotism for the Allied cause before heading on their way. In keeping with Army policies at that time, all women were white although one African American woman, Renee Messelin aka Ellarane Caldwell, did join the unit by claiming that she was white.

After training, the first operators, under the lead of Chief Operator Grace Banker, left for Europe in March 1918. Members of this unit were soon operating telephones in many exchanges of the American Expeditionary Forces in Paris, Chaumont, and seventy-five other French locations as well as British locations in London, Southampton, and Winchester. The Chief Operator of the Second American Unit of Telephone Operators was Inez Crittenden of California.

By July 1918, the Army telephone service in France tripled the number of calls per day due to the addition of the women operators. Soon, more American-built circuits had been added to locations in France, reducing reliance on French switchboards. The Signal Corps relaxed the bilingual requirement for new women recruits. In September 1918, Pershing informed the War Department of the immediate need for 130 additional operators and for 40 more every six weeks through 1919.

The War Department was not equipped to provide housing for the women operators overseas and reached an agreement with the YWCA to take over billeting, supplies, and chaperonage for the telephone operator units. During the Meuse–Argonne offensive, a team of telephone operators accompanied Pershing to Souilly, where they maintained communications around the clock. A YWCA secretary accompanied the team and arranged billeting for the women in an old shed that had been used to house French troops during the Battle of Verdun. Each of these operators near the front line managed 50 phone lines connected to the Army's Operations Section. As described by one of the operators:

Every order for an infantry advance, a barrage preparatory to the taking of a new objective, and, in fact, for every troop movement, came over the 'fighting lines', as we called them.

Two days after the Armistice, the chief signal officer for the First Army stated in his official report "a large part of the success of the communications of this Army is due to... a competent staff of women operators." Thirty of the operators received special commendations, many signed personally by Pershing, and Chief Operator Grace Banker was awarded the Distinguished Service Medal.

The operators were still considered essential after hostilities ceased, with many of the women being transferred to Paris. Individual operators were gradually discharged through 1919, with the final operator being discharged on January 20, 1920.

By the end of the war, AT&T had formed a labor force of women trained to work with a specific technology. Assumptions made about women in the workplace greatly affected this labor system and is most notably seen in the gendering of the job as a switchboard operator to be feminine as well as the language expected by the women who then worked this job (expecting to hear "Hello" from the "Hello Girls").

== Military status ==
The status of the women operators in the Army Signal Corps was muddled from the start. The women wore military uniforms and took the Army oath. However, the adjutant general of the United States sent an internal memo stating that the women were civilian employees, "authorized by contract and not by Army regulations". No contracts were ever prepared, though. The Army's lawyers determined that the women were not eligible for war risk insurance because they were civilian employees. In June 1918, the House of Representatives passed a bill authorizing war risk insurance for "women serving by official designation with the Army in the American overseas forces as telephone and telegraph operators", however that provision was deleted by the Senate.

In the press, news stories declared that the Army was recruiting women, that they would be "enlisted for the duration of the war", and referred to "young women soldiers". The telephone companies said the "girl telephone operators" would be "regular army". The letter sent to potential recruits stated "This will be the only unit composed of women which will actually wear Army insignia." The women were required to purchase their own kits, including uniforms, shoes, hats, and insignia, at a cost between $250 and $350, because they were told that their status was similar to officers who required individually-fitted uniforms; the monthly salary for most positions was $60.

Almost immediately after the war ended, the status of the telephone operators became a matter of contention. The women attempted to obtain official discharge papers and were refused. Leading Army officers, such as General George Squier, attempted to have the operators included in the federal bonuses being granted to "all persons serving in the military or naval forces"; their efforts were spurned by the War Department which insisted that the telephone operators were civilian employees. Squier and other officers continued to seek military recognition of the Hello Girls, to no avail.

Although they wore U.S. Army Uniforms and were subject to Army Regulations, they were not given honorable discharges but were considered "civilians" employed by the military. Multiple efforts were made to obtain Congressional recognition of the Signal Corps telephone operators in the decades after the war, with at least 24 bills being introduced between 1927 and 1977. Former operator Merle Egan Anderson persisted with efforts to have the operators recognized into the 1970s, by which time she was an elderly widow. Despite opposition by the Army, the Veterans Administration, and even the American Legion, the campaign by Anderson and others finally resulted in a bill passing and being signed into law by President Jimmy Carter in November 1977. By that time there were only eighteen of the original Hello Girls who had left for France in 1918, but they indicated no resentment toward their long-awaited victory.

60 years after the end of World War I, Congress approved Veteran Status, including honorable discharges, for the women of the Army Signal Corps. A Hello Girl uniform was previously on display at the U.S. Army Signal Museum (now closed). The uniform was worn by Louise Ruffe, a U.S. Signal Corps telephone operator.

== Recognition ==
In 2017, the book The Hello Girls: America's First Women Soldiers by Elizabeth Cobbs was released. The book is based on the diaries of several of the women who served as operators and outlines WWI battles and offensives in which the Hello Girls played key roles.

In June 2018, the documentary film The Hello Girls, telling the story of America's first female soldiers, was released featuring film and photographs from the National Archives. James Theres is executive producer and director, with author Elizabeth Cobbs listed as a producer.

In 2018, the musical The Hello Girls had its world premiere in New York City. The off Broadway cast recording was released in 2019.

In 2021, the children's book Grace Banker and the Hello Girls Answer the Call, written by Claudiel Friddell and illustrated by Elizabeth Baddeley, was published.

On March 4, 2023, the Mountain Home Public Library hosted a program on Idaho history featuring, in its Women's History Month segment, the biography of WWI Signal Corps telephone operator Anne Campbell, the only Hello Girl from Idaho to serve at the Western front. She was a member of the sixth and last group of stateside-trained Hello Girls to serve in France. After Campbell's death on April 8, 1988, a brass military marker was installed on her burial site in Morris Hill Cemetery, Boise.

In December 2024, as part of the Service member Quality of Life Improvement and National Defense Authorization Act for Fiscal 2025, the group was awarded the Congressional Gold Medal.

== See also ==
- Louise Le Breton (1900 - 1986), Hello Girl who advocated for official recognition of the group as a veterans
