= Angels of Bataan =

Group of U.S. Army and Navy combat nurses (1941–1945)

Angels of Bataan and Corregidor
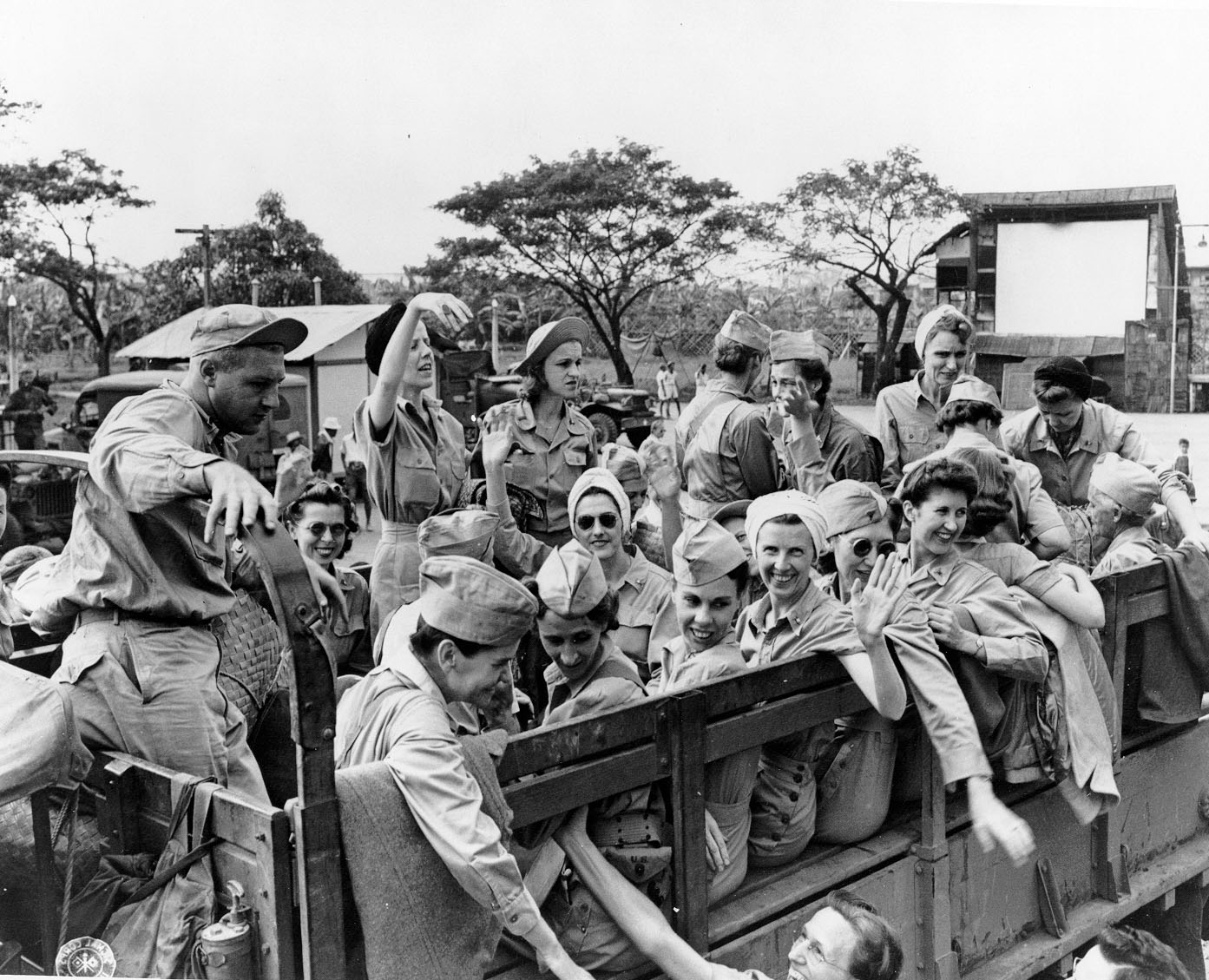
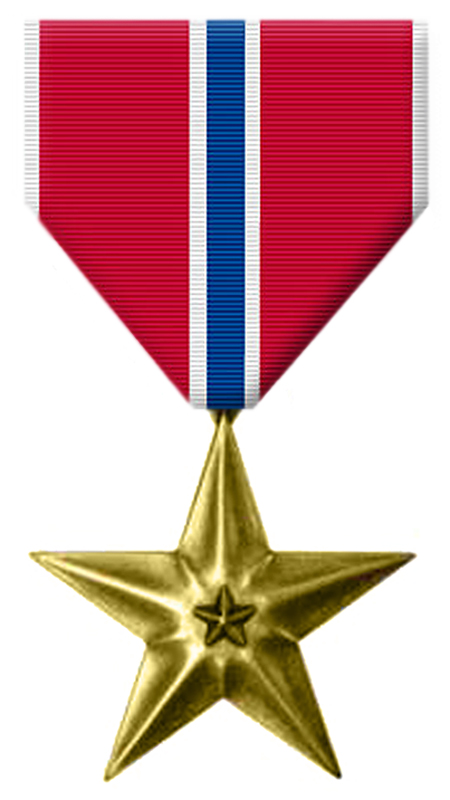
- Liberated nurses, February 12, 1945
- Active: December 1941 – March 1945
- Country: United States
- Allegiance: United States
- Branch: United States Army, United States Navy
- Type: Nurse corps
- Size: 78 nurses
- Nickname: Battling Belles of Bataan
- Engagements: Battle of Bataan; Battle of Corregidor; World War II; Philippines Campaign

Commanders
- Notable commanders: Capt. Maude C. Davison (US Army), Lt. Laura M. Cobb (US Navy)

The Angels of Bataan (also known as the "Angels of Bataan and Corregidor" and "The Battling Belles of Bataan") were the members of the United States Army Nurse Corps and the United States Navy Nurse Corps who were stationed in the Philippines at the outset of the Pacific War and served during the Battle of the Philippines (1941–1942). When Bataan and Corregidor fell, 11 navy nurses, 66 army nurses, and 1 nurse-anesthetist were captured and imprisoned in and around Manila. They continued to serve as a nursing unit while prisoners of war. They were freed in February 1945.

== In Manila ==
At the outset of World War II, US Army and US Navy nurses were stationed at Sternberg General Hospital in Manila, and other military hospitals around Manila. During the Battle of the Philippines (1941–1942), 88 US Army nurses escaped, in the last week of December 1941, to Corregidor and Bataan.

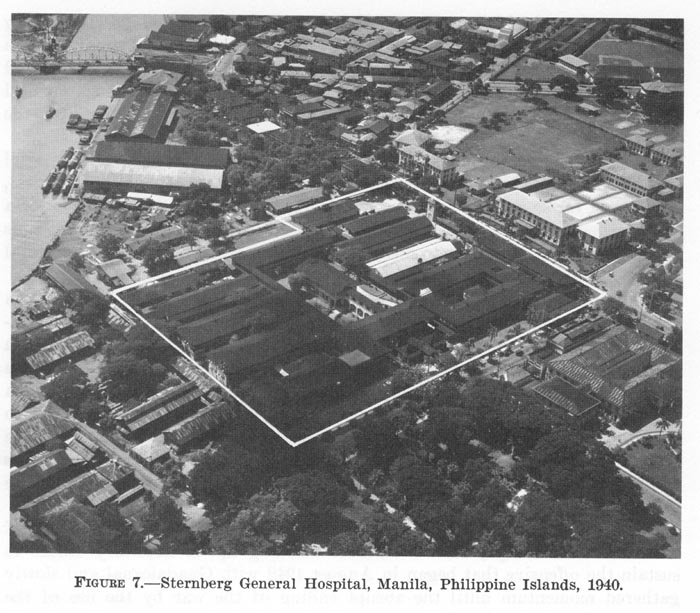
Sternberg General Hospital, Manila, 1940.

Two army nurses, Lt. Floramund A. Fellmeth and Lt. Florence MacDonald, accompanied severely wounded patients from Sternberg aboard the improvised hospital ship Mactan that departed Manila shortly after midnight of the New Year of 1942 for Australia.

The navy nurses, under the command of Lt. Laura M. Cobb, stayed behind in Manila during the initial invasion to support the patients there. One of them, Ann A. Bernatitus, escaped from Manila to Bataan just before Manila fell. The remaining 11 navy nurses were captured upon the fall of Manila and interned by the Japanese at Santo Tomas.

The army nurses, under the command of Capt. Maude Davison and 2nd Lt. Josephine Nesbit, together with navy nurse Bernatitus, escaped from Manila and went on to serve in the Battle of Bataan and the Battle of Corregidor.

== On Bataan ==
In late December 1941, many of the nurses were assigned to a pair of battlefield hospitals on Bataan named Hospital #1 and Hospital #2. These hospitals included the first open-air wards in US history since the Civil War. Tropical diseases, including malaria and dysentery, were widespread among both hospital patients and staff.

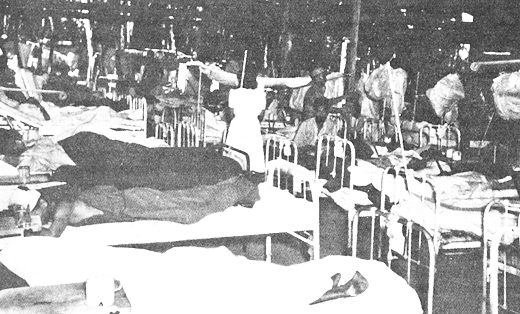
Nurse in Bataan Hospital Ward

Just prior to the fall of Bataan on 9 April 1942, the nurses serving there were ordered to the island fortress of Corregidor by General Wainwright (commander of the forces in the Philippines after MacArthur was ordered to Australia).

== On Corregidor ==
During the Battle of Corregidor, the nurses were stationed in the hospital and wards in the maze of tunnels connected to the Malinta Tunnel.

Malinta Tunnel hospital ward

=== A few escape ===
On 29 April, a small group of army nurses were evacuated, with other passengers, aboard a navy PBY Catalina. However, they were stranded on Mindanao and became prisoners. They were transferred to Manila and interned at the University of Santo Tomas. On 3 May, the sole navy nurse, Ann Bernatitus, a few more army nurses, and a small group of civilians were evacuated aboard the submarine Spearfish.

=== Fall of Corregidor ===
When Corregidor fell to Japanese forces under the command of General Masaharu Homma on 6 May, the remaining nurses were captured and on 2 July transferred to the Santo Tomas Internment Camp.

== Internment ==
=== At Santo Tomas ===
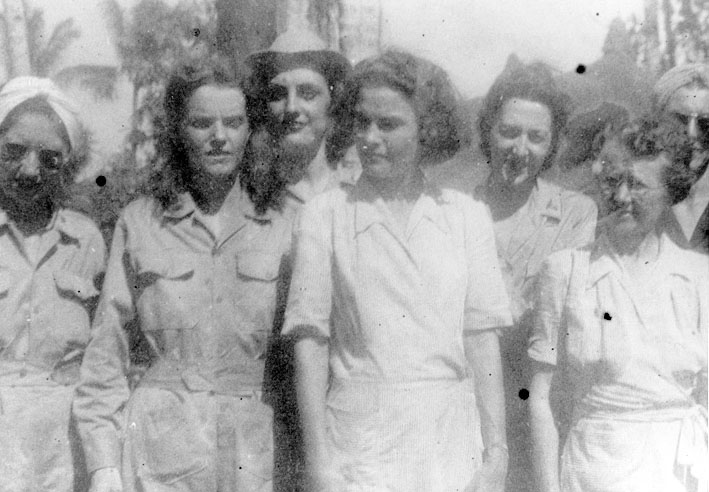
Army nurses in Santo Tomas, 1943. Left to right: Bertha Dworsky, Sallie Durrett, Earlene Black, Jean Kennedy, Louise Anchieks, and Millei Dalton.

The campus of the University of Santo Tomas was converted to the Santo Tomas Internment Camp by the Japanese during their occupation of the Philippines. The camp is described in detail in The War by Ken Burns. In addition to its civilian population, Santo Tomas became the initial internment camp for both the army and navy nurses, with the army nurses remaining there until their liberation.

Capt. Maude C. Davison, 57 years old and with 20 years of service experience, took command of the nurses, maintained a regular schedule of nursing duty, and insisted that all nurses wear their khaki blouses and skirts while on duty. She worked with Josephine Nesbit.

=== At Los Baños ===
In May 1943, the navy nurses, still under the command of Lt. Cobb, were transferred to a new internment camp at Los Baños, where they established a new infirmary and continued working as a nursing unit. At Los Baños they came to be known as "the sacred eleven".

=== On the home front ===
While the capture of the nurses was widely publicized in the US, little specific information was known of their fate until they were liberated.

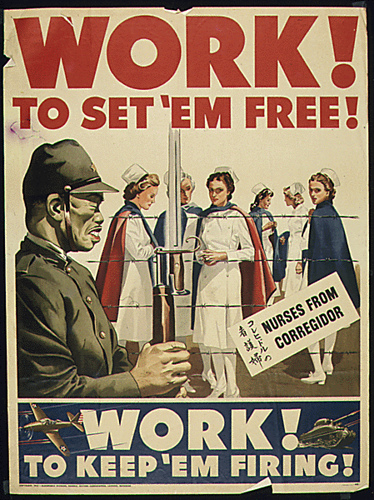
US government poster

Lt. Juanita Redmond, one of the few nurses to escape, published a memoir of her experiences on Bataan in 1943 that concluded with a dramatic reminder that her colleagues were still prisoners. The nurses' story was dramatized in several wartime movies, including:

- Cry 'Havoc' (MGM 1943)
- So Proudly We Hail! (Paramount 1943) (based on the Redmond book)
- They Were Expendable (MGM 1945)

When So Proudly We Hail was shown in the theaters, a recruitment booth staffed with Red Cross volunteers was set up in the lobby.

=== Final year of internment ===
In January 1944, control of the Santo Tomas Internment Camp changed from Japanese civil authorities to the Imperial Japanese Army, with whom it remained until the camp was liberated. Access to outside food sources was curtailed, the diet of the internees was reduced to 960 calories per person per day by November 1944, and further reduced to 700 calories per person per day by January 1945.

A Department of Veterans Affairs study released in April 2002 found that the nurses lost, on average, 30% of their body weight during internment, and subsequently experienced a degree of service-connected disability "virtually the same as the male ex-POW's of the Pacific Theater." Maude C. Davison's body weight dropped from 156 to 80 lbs (71 to 36 kg).

== Liberation ==
Emboldened by the success of the Raid at Cabanatuan, General Douglas MacArthur ordered Major General Vernon D. Mudge to make an aggressive raid on Santo Tomas in the Battle of Manila. The internees at Santo Tomas, including the nurses, were liberated on 3 February 1945, by a "flying column" of the 1st Cavalry.

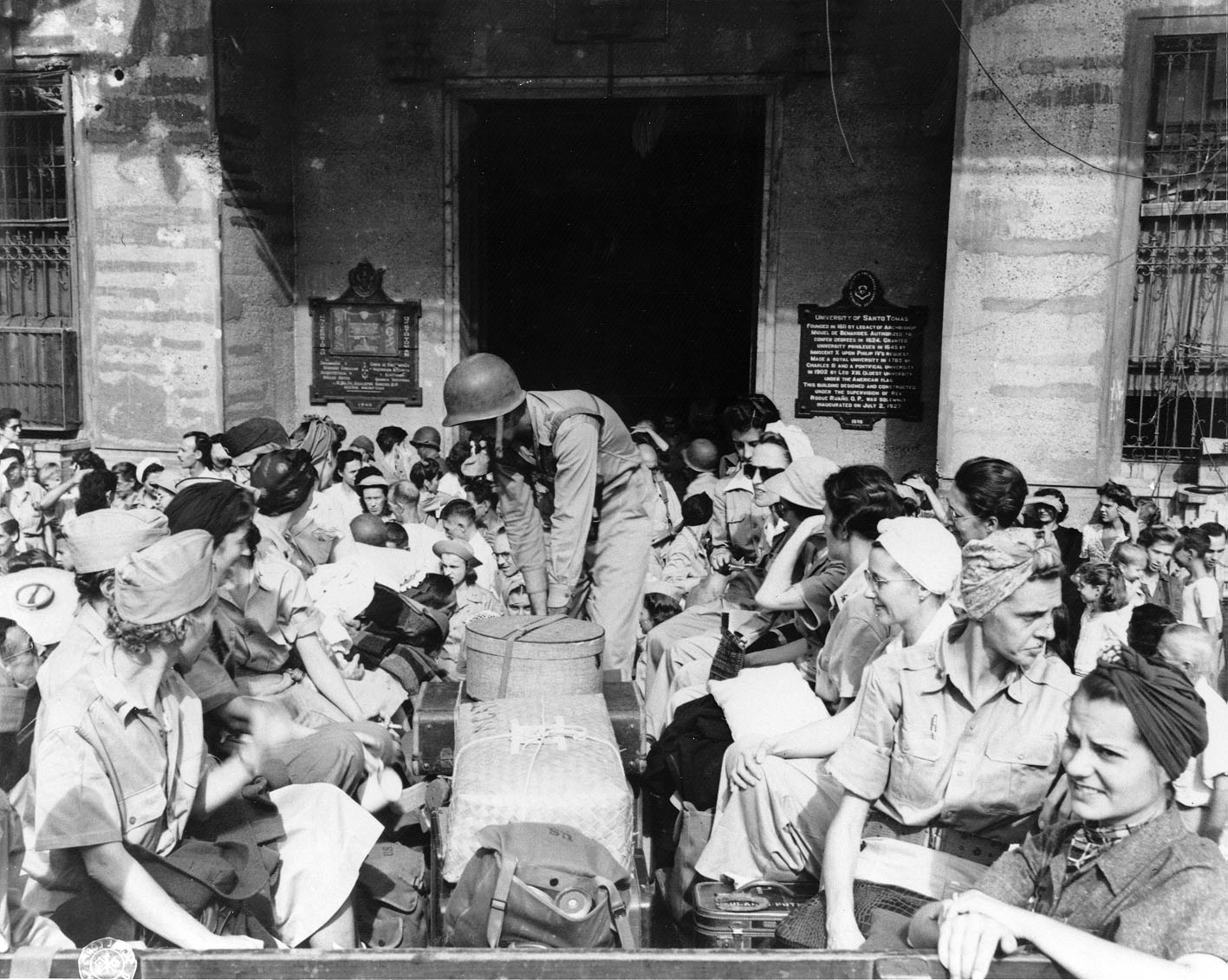
Army nurses climb into trucks leaving Santo Tomas, 12 February 1945

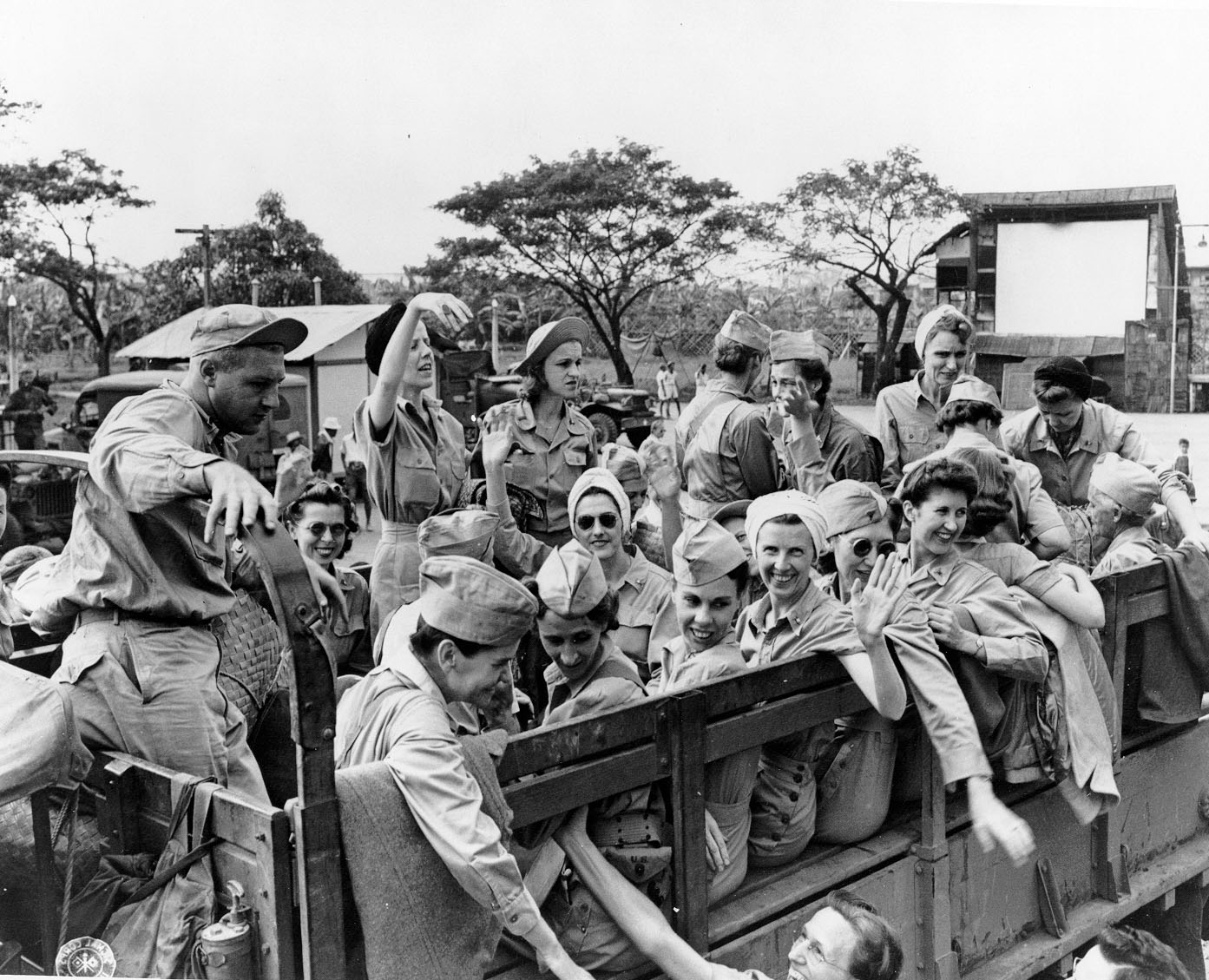
Army nurses leaving Santo Tomas

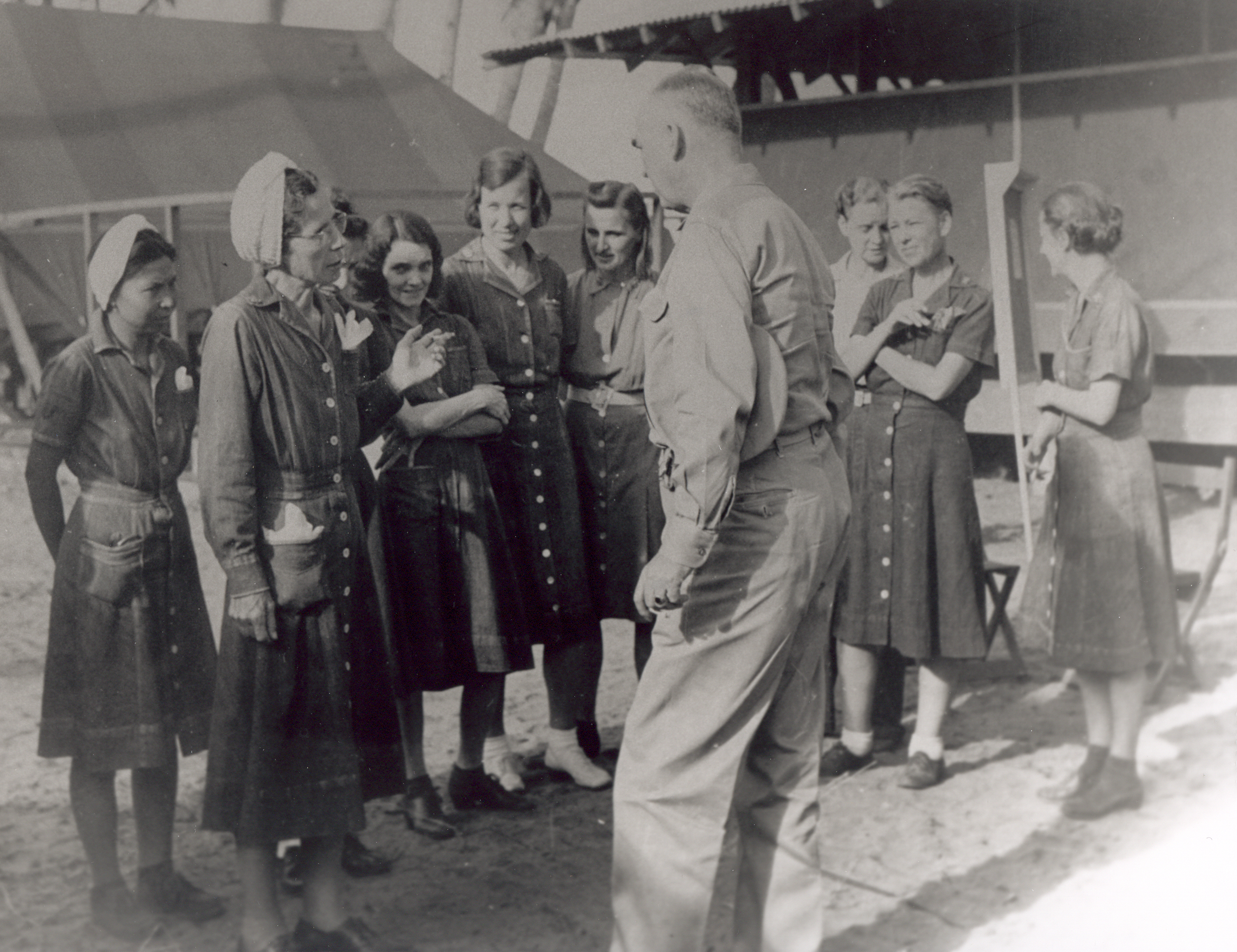
Navy nurses rescued from Los Baños, 23 February 1945

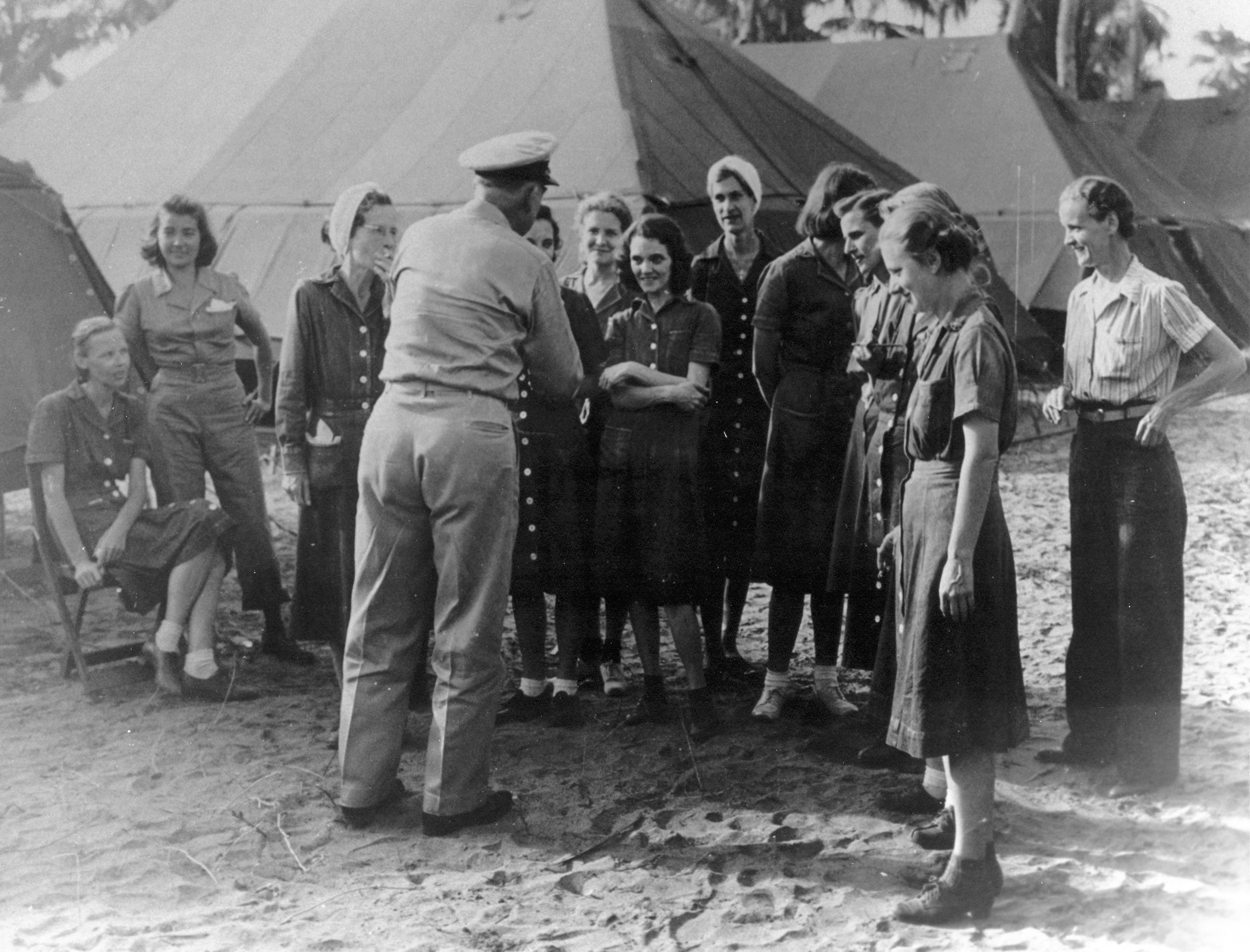
Navy nurses rescued from Los Baños

The navy nurses were subsequently liberated in the Raid at Los Baños.

Upon returning to the US, the US Army awarded their nurses, among other decorations, the Bronze Star for valor and a Presidential Unit Citation for extraordinary heroism in action. The navy nurses were likewise awarded Bronze Stars upon their return.

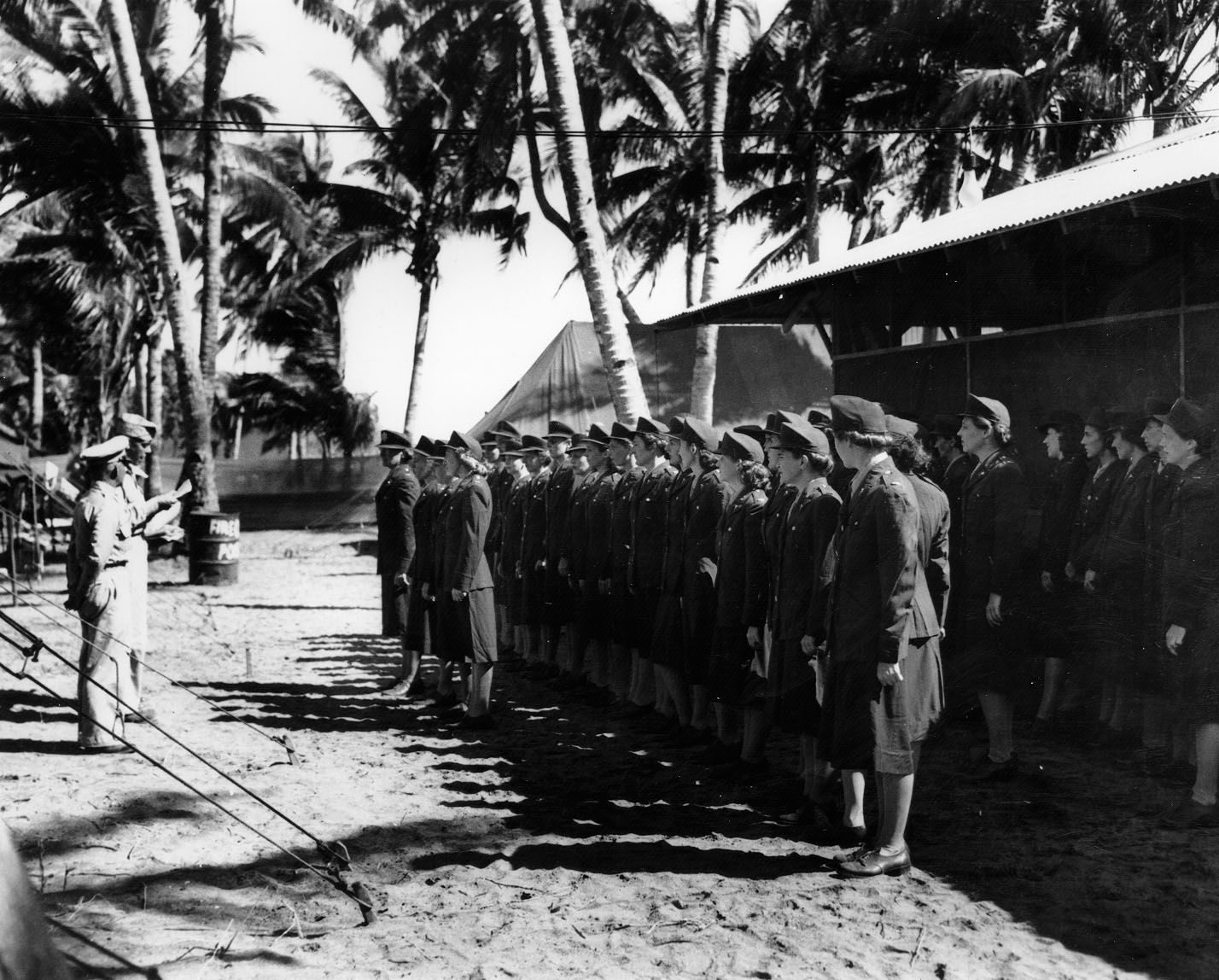
Army nurses awarded Bronze Stars by Gen. Denit on Leyte Island.

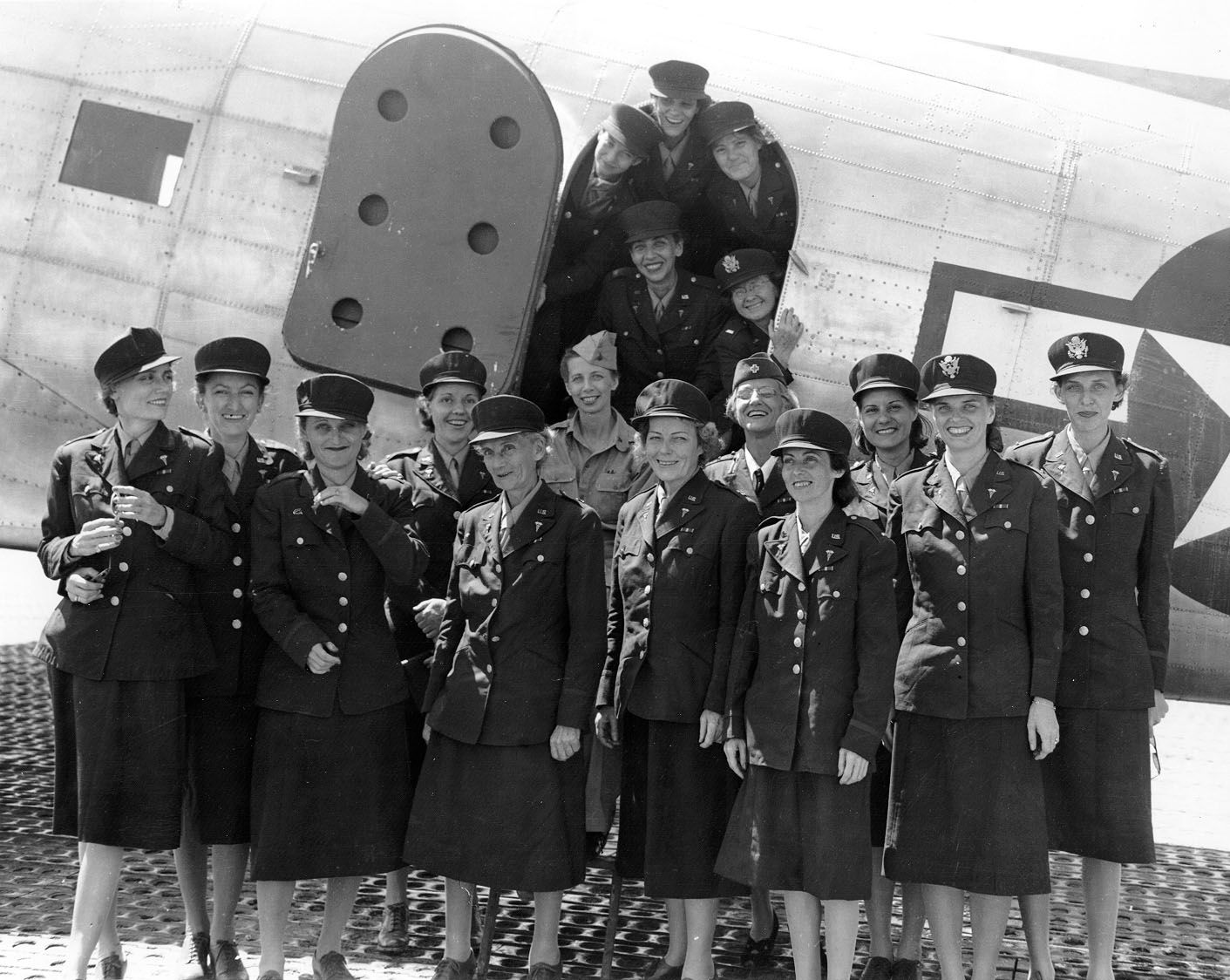
Nurses leaving for the US after receiving Bronze Stars, 20 February 1945

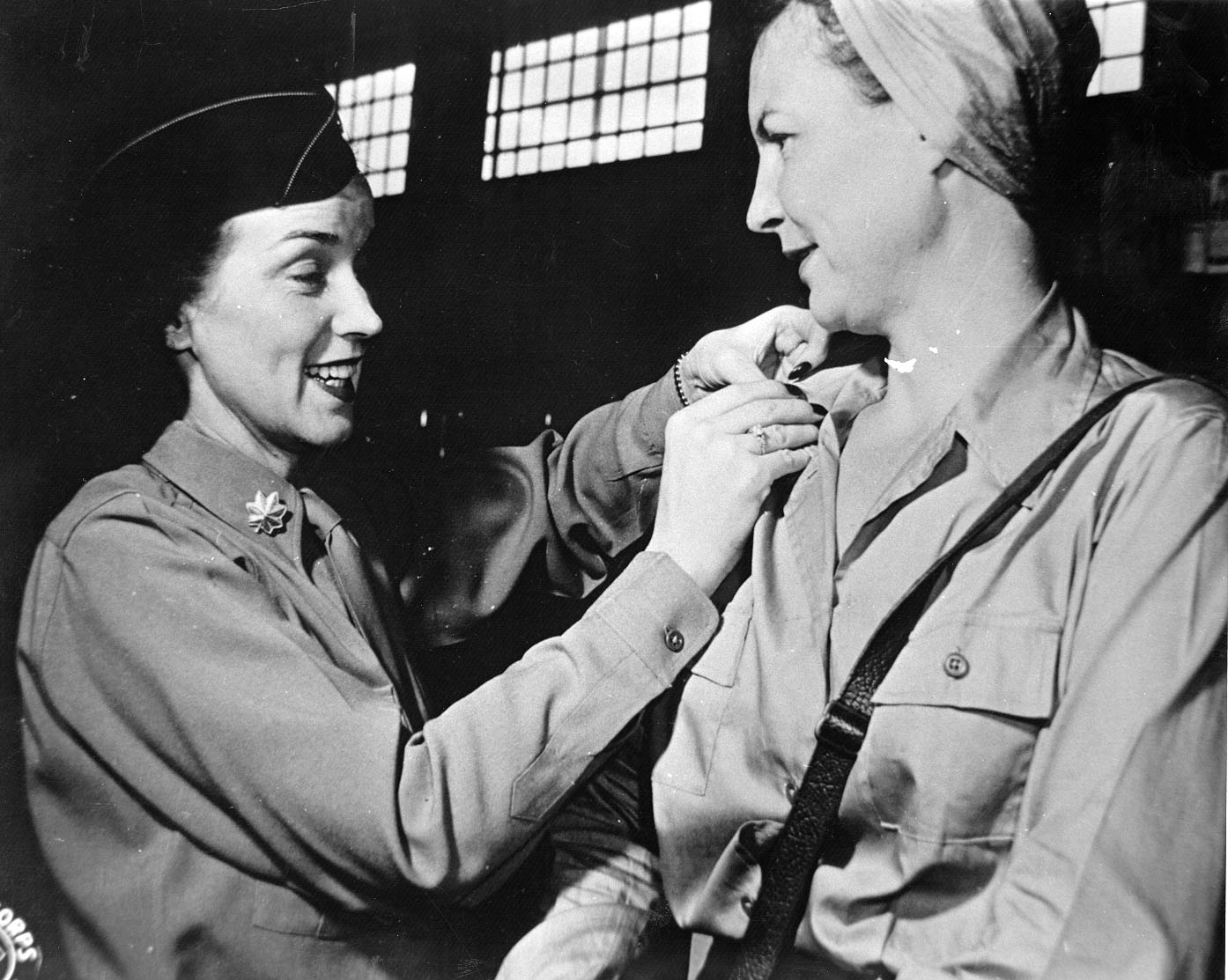
Lt. Rosemary Hogan gets new bars from Maj. Juanita Redmond.

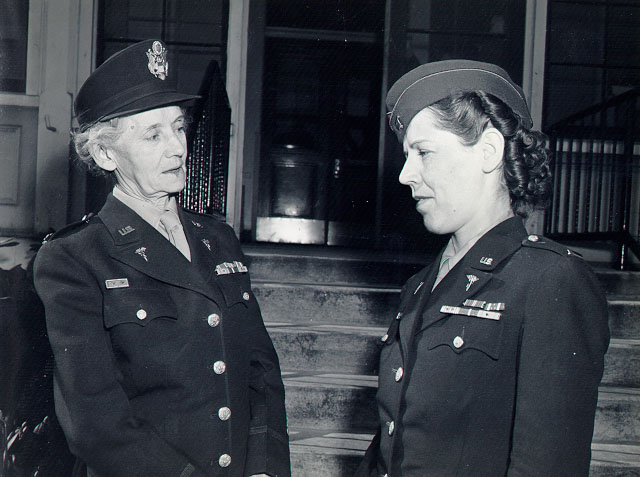
Maj. Maude Davison and Lt. Eunice Young at the Presidio

== Memorial and recognition ==
On 9 April 1980, a bronze plaque was dedicated at the Mount Samat shrine by men who survived Bataan and Corregidor. It reads:

To the Angels

In honor of the valiant American military women who gave so much of themselves in the early days of World War II. They provided care and comfort to the gallant defenders of Bataan and Corregidor. They lived on a starvation diet, shared the bombing, strafing, sniping, sickness and disease while working endless hours of heartbreaking duty. These nurses always had a smile, a tender touch and a kind word for their patients. They truly earned the name

"The Angels of Bataan and Corregidor"

Maj. Maude C. Davison, credited by many for keeping the army nurses alive by her insistence on the nurses maintaining their identity as nurses throughout their internment, was posthumously awarded the Distinguished Service Medal on 20 August 2001. A similar effort has not yet been undertaken for Chief Nurse Laura M. Cobb.

Nancy Belle Norton, a grandmother dubbed "the Angel of Bataan" was awarded the Medal of Freedom in 1945.

== Historical significance ==
- The first large group of American women in combat.
- The largest group of American women taken captive and imprisoned by an enemy.
- During World War II, the captured nurses were portrayed to motivate industrial production.
- During World War II, the captured nurses were portrayed to motivate recruitment of additional military nurses. By the end of the war, 59,283 army nurses volunteered to serve, more than half volunteered for and served in combat zones, and sixteen were killed by enemy action.
- By the 1980s, the "Angels of Bataan and Corregidor" were characterized as "The role model of Army Nursing".

== See also ==
- Dorothy Still Danner (one of the US Navy nurses held at Los Baños)
- Goldia O'Haver (one of the US Navy nurses held at Los Baños)
- Wilma Leona Jackson (one of five navy nurses captured on Guam)
- Agnes Newton Keith (American author captured and imprisoned on Borneo)
- Day Joyce Sheet (secret record kept at the Stanley Internment Camp, Hong Kong)
- Paradise Road (women interned on Sumatra during World War II)
- Margaret Utinsky (American nurse who aided American POWs under cover as Lithuanian nurse in Philippines during World War II)
- Margaret Dryburgh (UK nurse and missionary imprisoned in Singapore, author of "The Captive's Hymn")
