= Josephine Nesbit =

American nurse

- Born: December 23, 1894; Butler, Missouri, US
- Died: August 16, 1993 (aged 98)
- Military career
- Allegiance: United States
- Branch: United States Army
- Service years: 1918–1946
- Rank: Major
- Nickname: Josie
- Unit: United States Army Nurse Corps
- Conflicts: World War II
- Awards: Legion of Merit; Bronze Star Medal

Josephine May Davis (née} Nesbit; December 23, 1894 – August 16, 1993) was an American nurse who served in the United States Army Nurse Corps. She was second-in-command of the Angels of Bataan, army nurses stationed in the Philippine Islands during World War II, who were the largest group of American women taken as prisoners of war. Nesbit was noted for her "humane, dynamic leadership style." She was credited with the survival of the nurses during the years they were held in captivity at Santo Tomas Internment Camp.

== Early life and education ==
Nesbit was born on her family's farm near Butler, Missouri, on December 23, 1894. She was the seventh of ten children and experienced a difficult early childhood. As a child, she woke up before daylight to begin her chores and worked on the farm throughout the day. By the time Nesbit was 12 years old, both her parents had died, leaving her and her siblings orphaned. She first lived with her grandmother and later lived with a cousin in Kansas.

Nesbit left high school at age 16. After speaking with her sister's nursing superintendent, she chose to begin training as a nurse. Seeking "adventure and independence," Nesbit became a registered nurse in 1914.

== Military career ==
In 1918, an army recruiter visited Kansas City seeking nurses to help with the influenza pandemic, leading Nesbit to join the United States Army Nurse Corps. She became Reserve Army Nurse N700 665 at Camp Logan Hospital in Houston, Texas, on October 1, 1918. Serving in the army reserve corps enabled Nesbit to travel and experience new adventures during peacetime. She was able to hike the Rockies, visit Hawaii, and travel to Egypt's Valley of the Kings.

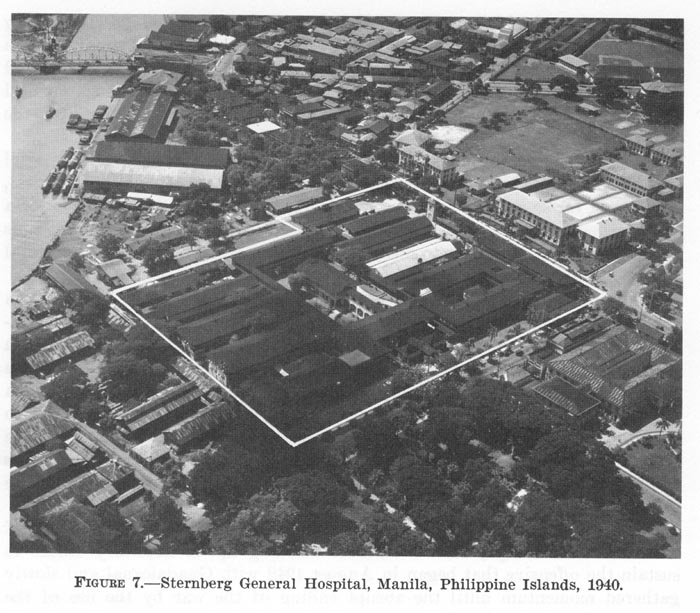
Stenberg General Hospital in Manila in 1940

=== World War II ===
Nesbit was on her second tour of duty in the Philippines when World War II began. Until the war began, being stationed in the Philippines had been considered a "desirable posting," as there was plenty of free time, mild weather, and "luxurious accommodations."

At Sternberg General Hospital in Manila, where she worked, Nesbit was a lieutenant and second in command to Captain Maude Davison, who was the chief nurse. She was responsible for the nurses' work schedules. While Davison was addressed as "Miss," Nesbit's staff referred to her as "Josie." Nesbit's Filipina colleagues referred to her as "Mama Josie." She referred to her staff as "my girls." Nesbit enjoyed socializing with her staff and was frequently consulted by them for advice on personal matters.

Malinta Tunnel Hospital, where Nesbit and her colleagues worked on Corregidor

In December 1941, Japan attacked the Philippines. On December 8, Nesbit was the acting chief nurse at Stenberg General Hospital, as Davison had been injured in a night raid. Since about 3:30 a.m., information about the Japanese attack on Pearl Harbor had been reaching the nurses in Manila via radio; the American nurses stationed in the Philippines were concerned about their relatives and friends in Honolulu. Nesbit told the staff, "Girls, you've got to sleep today. You can't weep and wail over this because you have to work tonight." Less than nine hours after the attack on Pearl Harbor, the Japanese military bombed Baguio. Fifteen minutes later, Clark Field was attacked; most of the American B-17 bombers were destroyed on the ground in the surprise attack. Shortly thereafter, the hospital filled with patients.

==== General Hospital #2 in Bataan ====
The Army Nurse Corps were ordered to set up a hospital in the jungle, General Hospital #2, located along the Real River. Without a building, the hospital ultimately served up to 6,000 patients and had 18 wards. Conditions were extremely rudimentary; patients lay on improvised cots and the jungle floor. Many nurses cared for the patients while sick with malarial fever themselves. Japanese soldiers were several miles away during the siege of Bataan, which lasted until early April, plus there was constant artillery fire. Nesbit helped maintain "morale and solidarity," insisting that "the women respond always as nurses, as army officers and as a united group." She took care of the nurses, commanding sick nurses to go to bed and locating shoes, clothing, and underwear for nurses who did not have them. She convinced military pilots who were flying to other Philippine islands to return with shoes and underwear for the nurses. To provide privacy for the nurses, Nesbit located canvas field shelters issued by the military and used sheets of burlap to "section off a part of the jungle where the nurses slept."

==== Corregidor ====
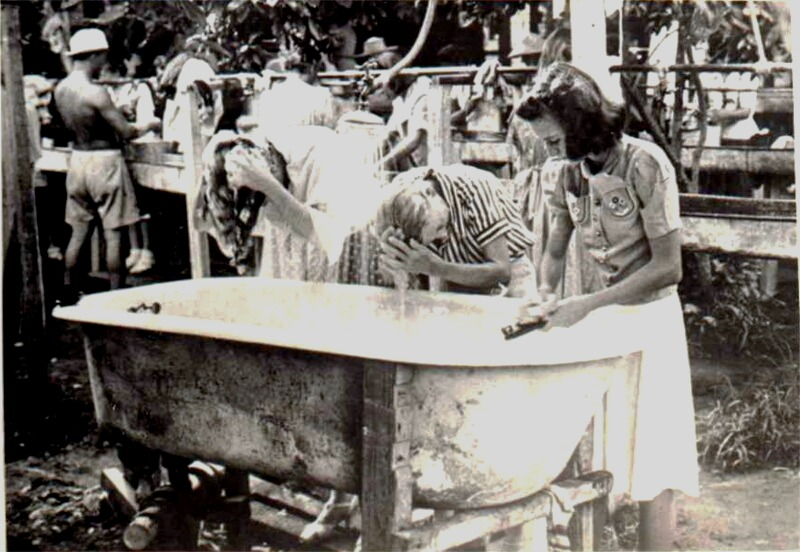
Female prisoners of war at Santo Tomas Internment Camp

In April 1942, Japanese soldiers were less than two miles away. Nesbit was informed by Colonel James E. Gillepsie, the medical commander, that only American nurses were to evacuate. When told that the 26 Filipina nurses who had worked alongside the American nurses were to remain, she refused to leave unless all nurses were evacuated. Gillepsie telephoned the headquarters and received permission to evacuate the Filipina nurses as well. The nurses were then safely evacuated to Corregidor island in Manila Bay. There, nurses worked in harsh conditions in an underground hospital located in Malinta Tunnel.

On May 3, 1942, Nesbit and several other nurses were offered an opportunity to leave the island by evacuating on the last Allied submarine, the USS Spearfish. Along with Ann Mealor and Ann Wurts, she refused, volunteering to remain at the hospital as she felt that her skills as a nurse were needed there.

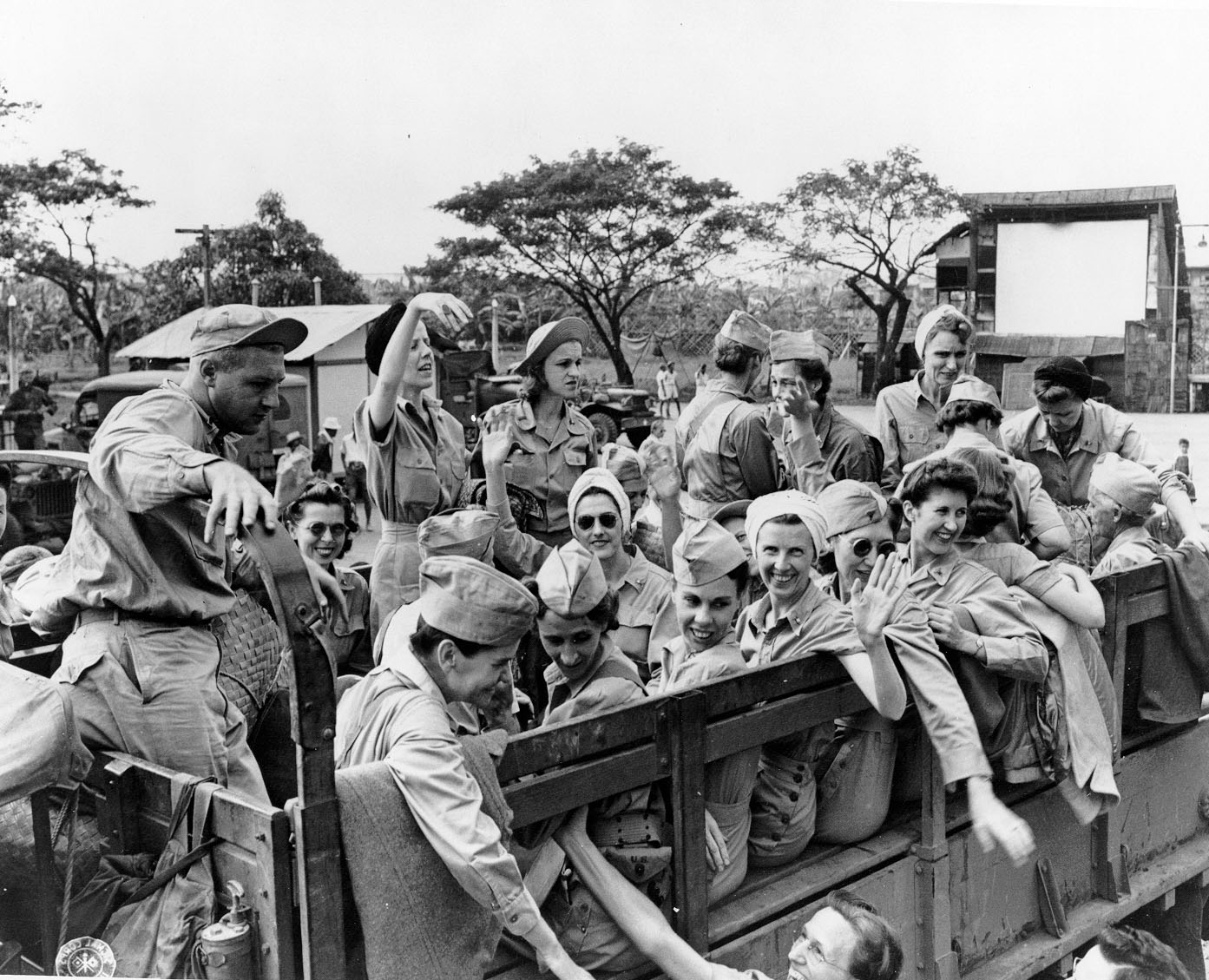
US Army nurses liberated from Santo Tomas Internment Camp in 1945

==== Santo Tomas Internment Camp ====
On May 6, 1942, Malinta Tunnel was captured by Japanese soldiers. The nurses were taken prisoners of war and taken to Santo Tomas Internment Camp in Manila. Disease and starvation were rampant in the camp and many nurses fell ill. There, Nesbit and Maude Davison ran the camp hospital from August 1942 to February 1945. For the next two years, Davison and Nesbit maintained the nurses' morale by establishing routines despite their imprisonment and requiring the nurses to work four-hour shifts every day. If one of the nurses was too weak to complete her shift, Nesbit would often replace her personally. She took care of the nurses, finding pieces of cloth for underwear and tiny pieces of meat to provide them with extra protein.

In January 1945, Allied forces took over the Philippine Islands. All the 3,700 prisoners of war were liberated shortly thereafter, including the 77 nurses. All of the nurses had survived, despite the challenges they had experienced. Nesbit was credited with the survival of the nurses in captivity.

== Later life ==
After liberation, Nesbit returned to the United States. She retired from the military on November 30, 1946, as a major with 28 years of service. In June 1949, Nesbit married William Davis, a soldier who had also been interned in the war. They lived a "quiet life" in California.

In her later life, Nesbit continued to advocate for the nurses, writing to the Veterans Administration when she felt that their needs were not being met. For 49 years, she sent cards and notes to every nurse who had served on her Philippine staff on Christmas and their birthdays. In 1992, a ceremony was held in Washington D.C. celebrating the Angels of Bataan; Nesbit, at age 97, was unable to attend due to poor health but wrote a note for the dinner program explaining to her former staff that her "heart and spirit remained young" and that both were "big enough to still embrace her girls."

Nesbit died on August 16, 1993. Her body was cremated and her ashes were scattered off the San Francisco coast.

== Honors and awards ==
- Legion of Merit
- Bronze Star Medal
- World War I Victory Medal
- American Defense Service Medal
- American Campaign Medal and American Theater Ribbon
- Asiatic-Pacific Campaign Medal
- World War II Victory Medal
- Distinguished Unit Badge, Presidential Unit Emblem with two Oak Leaf Clusters on Blue Ribbon
- Philippine Defense Ribbon with one Bronze Service Star
- Philippine Liberation Ribbon with one Bronze Service Star
- Philippine Independence Ribbon
