= Maude C. Davison =

Canadian-born, American nurse (1885–1956)

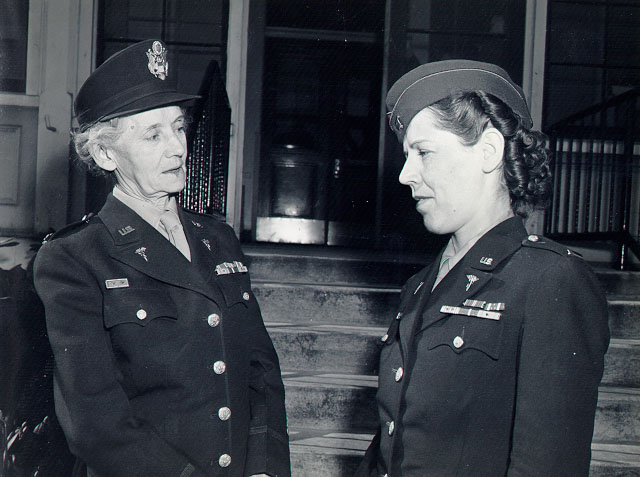
- Major Maude Davison and Lieutenant Eunice Young in 1945
- Born: Maude Campbell; 27 March 1885; Cannington, Ontario, Canada
- Died: 11 June 1956 (aged 71); Long Beach, California, United States
- Military career
- Allegiance: United States
- Branch: United States Army
- Service years: 1918–1946
- Rank: Major
- Conflicts: World War I World War II
- Awards: Army Distinguished Service Medal; Legion of Merit; Bronze Star Medal

Maude C. Davison (27 March 1885 – 11 June 1956) was a Canadian-born, American nurse. After a career in Canada, she moved to the United States. She served as the Chief Nurse of the United States Army Nurse Corps in the Philippines during World War II. She received numerous awards for her military service in both World War I and World War II. In 2001, she posthumously was granted an Army Distinguished Service Medal for her leadership of the Angels of Bataan, the first and largest group of American military women taken as prisoners of war.

== Early life ==
Maude Campbell was born on 27 March 1885 in Cannington, Ontario, Canada, to Janet (or Jeannette) Campbell. In 1894, her mother, who had immigrated from Scotland, married Abraham Sidders. She graduated in 1909 from the Ontario Agricultural College with a certificate from the MacDonald School of Home Economics.

== Career ==
Campbell began her career as a dietitian at the Baptist College in Brandon, Manitoba. Immigrating to the United States in 1909, she took employment in South Bend, Indiana, at the Epworth Hospital as a dietitian and instructor in domestic science and remained until 1911. She returned from Canada in 1914, and entered the Pasadena Hospital Training School for Nurses. In 1917, she graduated having earned her registered nurse designation. The following year, she joined the Nurse Reserves of the United States Army Nurse Corps and began working as a staff nurse at the base hospital of Camp Fremont in Palo Alto, California. After serving at Letterman General Hospital, in San Francisco, she was sent to Fort Leavenworth, Kansas, in 1920, to take up a post at the hospital for the United States Disciplinary Barracks. With this move, she became a United States citizen and was transferred as a second lieutenant to the Regular Army of the Nurse Corps. Between 1921 and 1922, she was deployed to Coblenz, Germany, serving with the Allied Occupation Forces assisting with Russian famine refugees, influenza victims and war casualties. Returning to the United States, in 1924, she was promoted to first lieutenant after passing the Chief Nursing Examination.

Davison entered Columbia University in 1926 and earned a bachelor's degree in home economics in 1928. Upon completion of her education, she returned to service as a nurse and dietician at several Army hospitals throughout the US. In 1939, she was deployed during World War II to Fort Mills Station Hospital on Corregidor Island in the Philippines. She was promoted to captain in 1941 and placed as chief nurse of the nursing corps of the Philippine Department. Most of the nurses in the Far East Command were serving under Davison with her second-in-command, Josephine Nesbit, at Sternberg Hospital on the south side of Manila Bay. When the Japanese invaded the Philippines, on 8 December 1941, the day after the bombing of Pearl Harbor, Davison organized civilian nurses to help with the casualties, sending five army nurses and fifteen local Filipino nurses to the facility at Fort Stotsenburg. Within a week the Fort, along with other military facilities, was in ruins and the nurses were prepared for evacuation back to Sternberg.

Before Christmas, Davison was injured in a bombing raid and turned command over to Nesbit. Between Christmas and New Year's Eve 1941, all the army nurses were evacuated from Manila and sent to Bataan. Davison left with the last of the American troops for Corregidor to coordinate the nursing activities in establishing two jungle hospitals, known simply as Hospital #1 and Hospital #2. From these field hospitals, the nurses carried out battlefield nursing. Simultaneously, she directed nurses in setting up the hospital where the troops on Corregidor had been sent in the Malinta Tunnel. The underground hospital had one central hallway that was one-hundred-yards long and eight wards established in lateral corridors. In April 1942, as Bataan fell, the nurses, including the Filipino civilians, were evacuated to Corregidor and the tunnel hospital. At the end of the month, when it became evident that Corregidor would also fall, an attempt was made to evacuate some of the nurses. Davison and Colonel Wibb Cooper, the ranking medical officer, made the selections of who would be evacuated. Though Davison later said the twenty evacuees were chosen randomly, the nurses saw through her ruse, noting that those who were ill, wounded or fatigued or might not withstand the pressure of imprisonment were chosen.

Upon the Allied surrender in May 1942, Davison led her 66 remaining nurses to their captivity at Santo Tomas Internment Camp in Manila. They joined 11 United States Navy Nurse Corps personnel under the command of Lieutenant Commander Laura Cobb, who had surrendered to the Japanese the previous January. In September, ten of the nurses who had been part of the April evacuation joined them as their aircraft was damaged while refueling en route to Australia and they were captured. The nurses came to be known as the Angels of Bataan and were the first and largest group of American military women taken as prisoners of war (POWs). Known as a strict disciplinarian, she required her nurses to follow her rules and army regulations to the letter, despite the fact that they were in a Japanese-run camp. She also organized the prison camp hospital and continued managing her staff. Conditions in the camp caused the death of 390 of the 3,785 captives, but none of the nurses were among the dead.

After three years, on 3 February 1945, the camp was liberated and Davison was hospitalized because of her poor health. When the nurses arrived in the United States at the end of the month, Davison, who normally weighed 135 pounds (61 kg) weighed only 80 pounds (36 kg). Her nurses credited Davison with their survival and though she was nominated for the Army Distinguished Service Medal, the War Decorations Board denied the honor, based upon a determination that she did not act independently but under the advice of the physicians and military commanders with whom she served. She was awarded the Legion of Merit and medically retired on 31 January 1946. In 1947, Davison married the Reverend Charles W. Jackson, who had served as dean of Long Beach City College. The two had met many years earlier when she was working at the Baptist College and she had rented a room from his family, which had immigrated to the United States, during her nursing studies in Pasadena, California. Jackson, a widower, had two grown sons from a prior marriage who found "Davy", as they called Davison, distant and formal. After her marriage, she rarely had contact with her former staff, but in 1955 she participated in a Veterans Day parade in Los Angeles, where she received a special citation of merit.

== Death and legacy ==
Davidson died on 11 June 1956 at the Veterans Hospital in Long Beach, California, following a lengthy illness. She was buried near her mother in the Cedar Vale Cemetery, Cannington, Ontario, Canada. In 2001, she was posthumously recognized with the Army Distinguished Service Medal due to the efforts of the surviving "Angels" such as Brigadier General Connie L. Slewitzke, Senator Daniel Inouye, and many others.

== Military awards ==
World War I:

- Army of Occupation of Germany Medal
- World War I Victory Medal

World War II:

- Distinguished Service Medal
- Legion of Merit
- Bronze Star Medal
- American Campaign Medal with the American Theater Ribbon
- American Defense Service Medal with Foreign Service Clasp
- Asiatic–Pacific Campaign Medal with two Bronze Battle Stars
- Philippine Defense Medal with a Bronze Service Star
- Philippine Independence Medal
- Philippine Liberation Medal with Bronze Service Star
- Presidential Unit Citation, with blue ribbon and two Oak Leaf Clusters
- World War II Victory Medal
