= Juanita Redmond Hipps =

World War II US Army nurse (1912–1979)

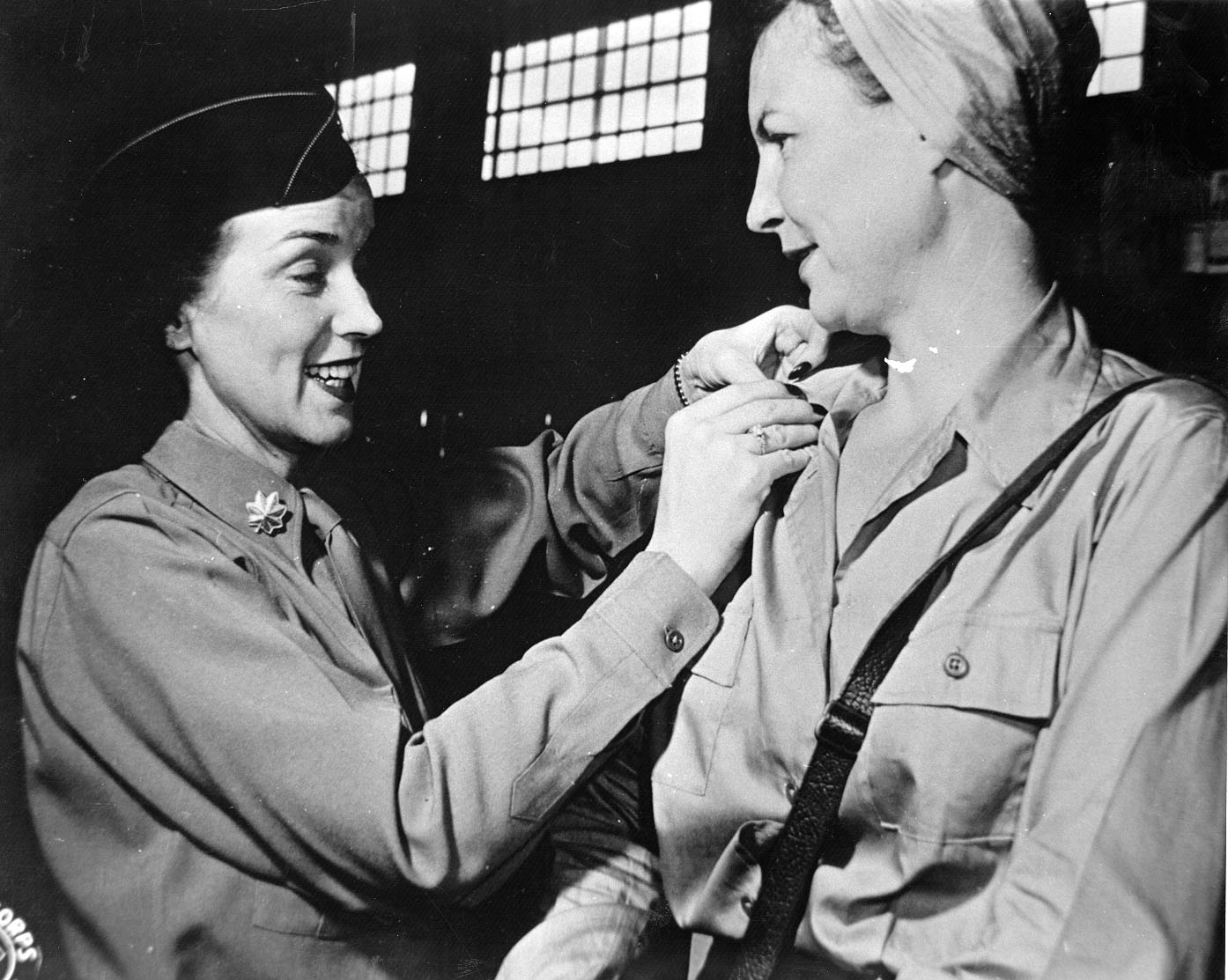
- Major Juanita Redmond, left, awards new bars to Lieutenant Rosemary Hogan in 1945
- Born: July 1, 1912; Swansea, South Carolina, US
- Died: February 25, 1979 (aged 66); St. Petersburg, Florida, US
- Burial place: Arlington National Cemetery
- Military career
- Allegiance: United States
- Branch: United States Army (United States Army Nurse Corps)
- Service years: 1936–1969
- Rank: Lieutenant Colonel
- Awards: Purple Heart; Bronze Star

Lieutenant Colonel Juanita Redmond Hipps (July 1, 1912 – February 25, 1979) was a US Army nurse during World War II. She was present in the Philippines during the early part of the war and was regarded as one of the Angels of Bataan. A bestselling book she wrote about her experiences formed the background for the 1943 war movie So Proudly We Hail! Hipps helped to establish the United States Air Force's flight nurse program. She remained with the army until her retirement in 1969 and traveled the world on postings alongside her husband, a US Air Force general. The US Air Force Association's highest award for nursing is named in her honor.

== Early life ==
Hipps was born in Swansea, South Carolina, on July 1, 1912. She trained as a nurse at the South Carolina State Hospital and joined the United States Army Nurse Corps in 1936. She was posted to Manila in the Philippines in 1939.

== World War II ==
After the 1941 outbreak of war between Japan and the United States, Hipps was posted to Bataan and Corregidor where she became known as one of the Angels of Bataan during the war's early months. Unlike most of the nurses in the Philippines, she was evacuated to Australia with seven of her colleagues prior to the Japanese occupation. During the remainder of the war, Hipps served in the United States to promote war bond drives and to boost the recruitment of nurses. She was one of the first nurses to be awarded gold flight wings and also helped to establish the United States Army Air Corps flight nurse program. Hipps wrote the book I Served on Bataan about her experiences in the Philippines, which became a bestseller in 1943 and helped inspire the war movie So Proudly We Hail! By May 13, 1944, she was a major. In the course of her service she was awarded the Purple Heart, Bronze Star, three Presidential Unit Citations and campaign ribbons for the United States and Philippines.

== Post-war ==
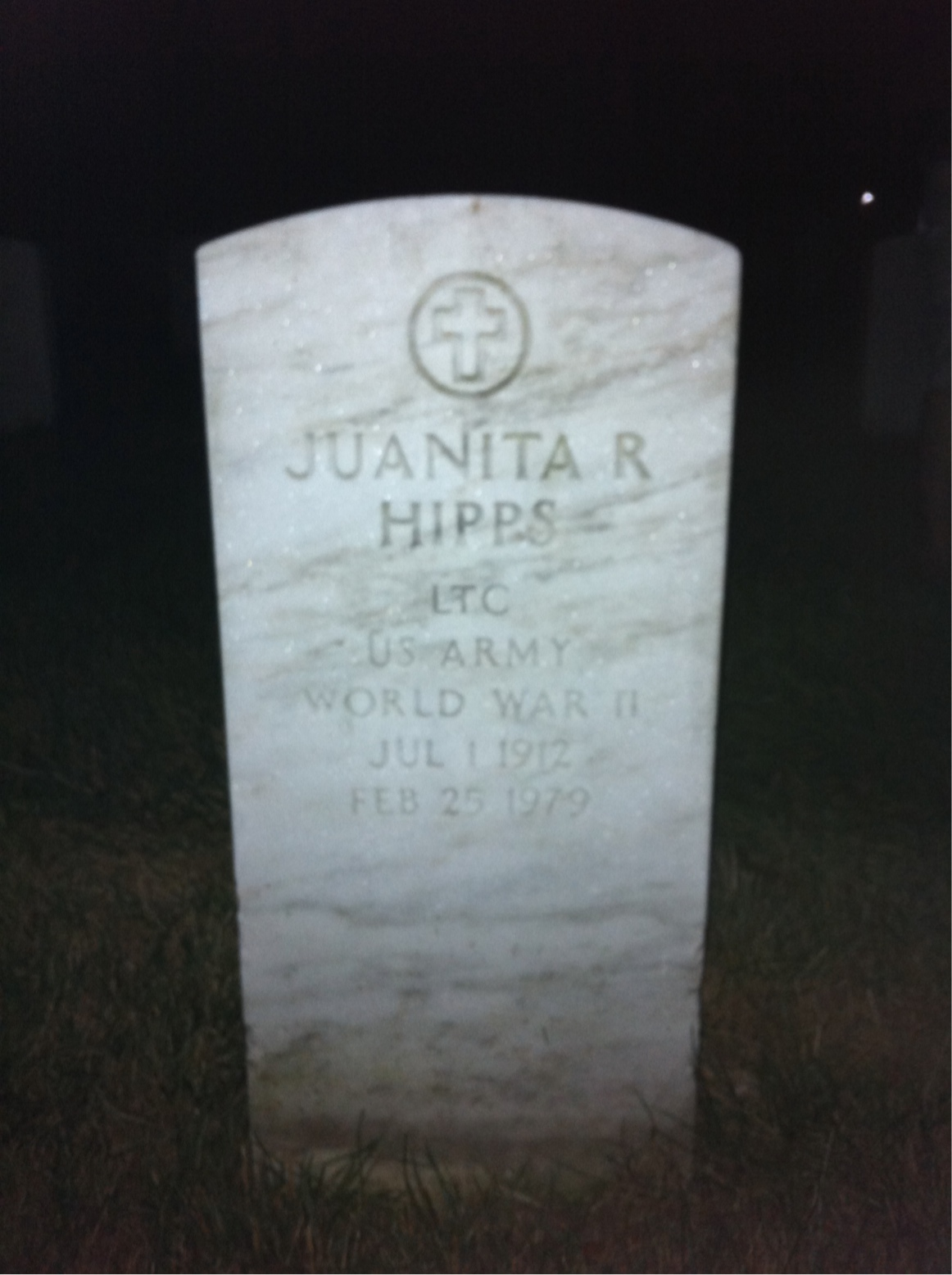
Grave at Arlington National Cemetery

Hipps married United States Army Air Forces officer William Grover Hipps in 1946 and they would go on to have a son, two grandchildren and three great grandchildren. William was later promoted to general rank and Juanita followed him on postings around the US, Iran and the Far East. In 1955 she was living in Okinawa, Japan where she became interested in Japanese culture and was an avid collector of antiques. In 1958 she was living with her husband in Redlands, California. Juanita retired from the army in 1969, by which time she held the rank of lieutenant-colonel. She died at her home in St. Petersburg, Florida, on February 25, 1979, and was buried at Arlington National Cemetery with full military honors. The US Air Force Association presents the Juanita Redmond Award, their highest nursing award, in her memory.
