= Inez Haynes =

American nurse (1909–1997)

Col. D'Lorz Inez Haynes

D'Lorz Inez Haynes (June 3, 1909 – May 29, 1997) was the 10th director of the United States Army Nurse Corps from October 1, 1955 until August 31, 1959.

== Early life ==
Haynes was born the first childe of Floyd Haynes and Lola Rampey Haynes on June 3, 1909 in Paint Rock, Texas. After graduating from Mills High School, she attended a nursing school at Scott and White Hospital.

She began nursing in 1932 when she was commissioned in the Army Nurse Corps Reserve. After coming on active duty in 1933, becoming an operations room nurse at Fort Sam Houston and Sternburg General Hospital. Immediately before and during World War II, her overseas assignments included service in the Philippines, the Pacific, and Japan. She served as the nursing chief of the First Army Area.

Under her tenure as Chief, the Corps received its first male nurses, members of the Army Nurse Corps Reserve, and for the first time Army Nurse Corps officers were assigned to airborne divisions. In 1958, she was among the first three women to be promoted to the permanent grade of colonel in the regular Army.

She received the Legion of Merit among her awards and honors. After retiring in August 1959, Haynes served as director of the National League for Nursing, and later on the faculty of the College of Nursing at the University of Texas. She died on May 29, 1997.
