= So Proudly We Hail! =

1943 film by Mark Sandrich

- Theatrical release poster
- Directed by: Mark Sandrich
- Written by: Allan Scott
- Produced by: Mark Sandrich
- Starring: Claudette Colbert; Paulette Goddard; Veronica Lake
- Cinematography: Charles Lang
- Edited by: Ellsworth Hoagland
- Music by: Edward Heyman; Miklós Rózsa
- Production company: Paramount Pictures
- Distributed by: Paramount Pictures
- Release date: September 9, 1943
- Running time: 126 minutes
- Country: United States
- Language: English
- Box office: $3 million (US rentals)

So Proudly We Hail! is a 1943 American war film directed and produced by Mark Sandrich from a screenplay by Allan Scott based on the book I Served on Bataan by Lieutenant Colonel Juanita Redmond. Claudette Colbert, Paulette Goddard, and Veronica Lake star as U.S. Army nurses sent to the Philippines during the early days of World War II. George Reeves, Sonny Tufts (in his film debut), and Mary Servoss also star in major supporting roles.

Produced by Paramount Pictures, the film was one of several pieces portraying the Philippines campaign, specifically the Angels of Bataan. At the time of its release, the nurses in Bataan were still being held as prisoners of war. After backlash to the inaccuracy of other projects with the same theme, Paramount took great lengths to ensure that the film was accurate by collaborating with Redmond, the War Department, and several advisors. Although the love-story plot line is the primary thrust of the film, the difficulties and emotional toll of war are also shown.

The film was released by Paramount on September 9, 1943, over a year after the Philippines campaign. The film received critical acclaim, with praise towards Sandrich's direction, performances of the cast, and accuracy to its subject. The film received numerous Academy Awards nominations, including Goddard for Best Supporting Actress. The film has also been examined in modern times for its perspective of female military service during World War II.

== Plot ==
The film begins with a group of several nurses arriving in Australia, having been some of the few evacuated before the Japanese captured their base. One of them is Lt. Janet "Davey" Davidson, who wanted to stay and fainted at the start of the evacuation and remains in a coma. An officer asks the other nurses to describe their journey up to that point, beginning a flashback.

The flashback begins in California, as the girls prepare to set off for Hawaii. Davey is the kind, but strictly professional leader of the nurses unit. Lt. Joan O'Doul, another nurse, is revealed to have two fiancés because she cannot say no to a man. Davey covers for her by stopping the two from figuring out her relationship, and the nurses quickly get on the boat. While en route, the Japanese bomb Pearl Harbor and the boat is rerouted to the Philippines. The survivors of another boat in the convoy board the nurses boat. One of the survivors, nurse Olivia D'Arcy, quickly irritates the other nurses due to her rude and uncaring attitude. Davey also takes an initial disliking to one of the soldiers, John Summers, but the two come to like one another over time. Joan earns the affection of a nervous marine named Kansas, whom she playfully teases.

At Christmas, the soldiers and nurses hold a festive party to celebrate. Davey dances with John, while Joan gives into the advances of Kansas. While helping Joan and Davey get ready for the party, another nurse named Rosemary finds a necklace that belongs to Olivia. Joan and Olivia get into a fight, after which Olivia refuses to go to the party. After the party, Olivia reveals that she was to marry her fiancé on Christmas leave, but he was killed in the attack on Pearl Harbor; she watched him die. Since then, she has sworn to kill as many Japanese as possible.

As the ship approaches the Philippines, Manila is declared an open city and is again rerouted to land at a base in Bataan. Joan takes a liking to the Filipino children at the base, while Davey works with Capt. "Ma" McGregor to keep up with the large amounts of wounded and casualties amidst a lack of supplies. Olivia initially takes up the job of taking care of wounded Japanese POWs, but she cannot bring herself to kill even one. However, she and Davey begin to develop a more positive working relationship. Davey is reunited with John, where their romance solidifies before he is ordered elsewhere. The base eventually has to be evacuated as the Japanese advance. Olivia sacrifices herself to ensure the other nurses escape by suicide bombing the approaching enemies with a grenade.

The troops create a makeshift "hospital" in the jungle, which is practically untamed despite being near a town. The nurses do their best as supplies dwindle, and casualties pile up from battle and disease. Joan reunites with Kansas, now leading a regiment of Filipinos and brings hopeful news of a convoy on its way. As Davey is once again reunited with John, she learns that Ma's son has undergone a double amputation while battling malaria. She arranges for Ma to be with him as he dies, which puts her through grief but for which she is thankful to Davey. John then informs Davey that the Japanese blockade has been successful—not only is it impossible for a convoy to get through, but General McArthur has been ordered to Australia as confidence in defending the island diminishes.

As the front line collapses, Davey tries to persuade the Coronel to evacuate the base. Before they can, a bombing raid destroys much of the base and kills several nurses and doctors. The Japanese show no respect for international law, bombing clearly marked hospitals and ambulances. The survivors evacuate to a fortress island along with most others. Joan notably has to knock Kansas out with a rock as he refuses to surrender and wants to fight to the death. Things on the island start off well, but take a turn for the worse as bombing becomes more common. Within a few weeks, it becomes obvious that the Philippines will fall.

John and Davey decide to get married, despite this being against military law. The base chaplain conducts a makeshift ceremony, and the two are married. Not long after, John and several other soldiers set out to Mindanao to try to secure supplies. Before he can return, the base financial department starts burning money and the nurses are told they are being secretly evacuated first. Initially hesitant, most agree to go. Joan gives many of her belongings away to her patients, and tells Kansas not to die. He says he never dies, which is not reassuring as every time he's said something never happens to him it does soon afterward. Davey refuses to leave, saying she promised John she would be here when he returns. Ma tells her John's expedition is considered lost, but only the officers were informed. Upon learning John is probably dead, Davey faints. The nurses evacuate, and not long afterward the Japanese take the island.

The flashback ends, with the officer saying he knows how to wake Davey up. He goes to her, and reads a heartfelt letter from John. John informs her he is still alive, still fighting, and still loves her. Davey wakes up and simply says, "John" and the movie ends.

== Cast ==
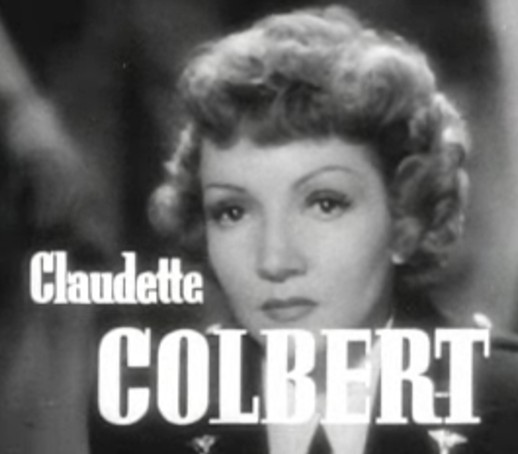
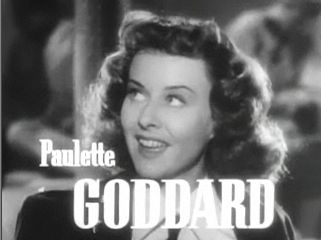
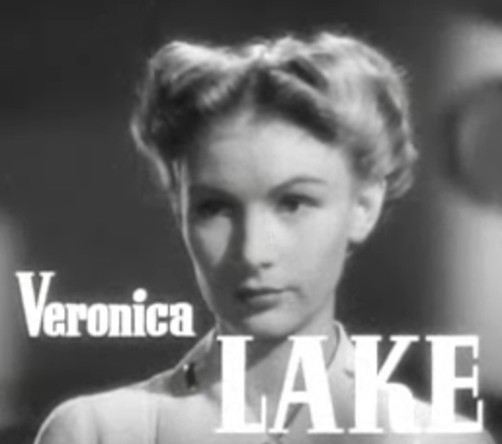
Claudette Colbert as Lt. Janet "Davey" Davidson
Paulette Goddard as Lt. Joan O'Doul
Veronica Lake as Lt. Olivia D'Arcy

- George Reeves as Lt. John Summers
- Cora Witherspoon as Mrs. Burns-Norvell
- Barbara Britton as Lt. Rosemary Larson
- Walter Abel as Chaplain
- Sonny Tufts as Kansas
- Mary Servoss as Capt. "Ma" McGregor
- Ted Hecht as Dr. Jose Bardia
- John Litel as Dr. Harrison
- Dr. Hugh Ho Chang as Ling Chee
- Mary Treen as Lt. Sadie Schwartz
- Kitty Kelly as Lt. Ethel Armstrong
- Helen Lynd as Lt. Elsie Bollenbacher
- Lorna Gray as Lt. Tony Dacolli
- Dimples Cooper as Filipino Nurse

== Production ==
Allan Scott said he was originally asked to make a two-reel film for the Red Cross. Then while in Washington through the help of Eleanor Roosevelt he met nurses rescued from Corregidor at Walter Reed Hospital. Scott said he heard about "the atrocities and rapes that were committed on their comrades in the Bataan peninsula. To this day the Army has not revealed that particular catastrophe." He wrote a first draft which he said "was censored by the Army only because it told the truth. However, I did get an excellent script eventually."

The film originally was titled Hands of Mercy. It was announced in July 1942 with Allan Scott to write the script and Mark Sandrich to direct.

In August 1942, the title was changed to So Proudly We Hail. The same month Claudette Colbert was announced for the lead.

Cry Havoc, an unsuccessful play about nurses on the Bataan peninsula, had been much criticized for its inaccuracies so Paramount took extra care with the film to get approval from the War Department and military and nursing advisers. MGM released a film based on the play in 1943.

Macdonald Carey and Joel McCrea reportedly were meant to star at one stage. Paulette Goddard reportedly had the script rewritten so her role was as prominent as Colbert's. George Reeves was borrowed from producer Harry Sherman. Sonny Tufts made his debut in the movie.

== Reception ==
The film earned acclaim on its release for its realistic portrayal of the war. Since then, it has continued to be acclaimed and studied for its rare perspective of female military service during World War II.

=== Contemporary ===
In his September 10, 1943, review in The New York Times, Bosley Crowther observes that the picture "does give a shattering impression of the tragedy of Bataan. This accomplishment is due in large measure to the unremitting realism with which Producer-Director Mark Sandrich has reenacted battle-action scenes. He has put into unforgettable pictures the torture of the Bataan campaign—the weariness, the hopelessness and misery; the inadequacies in equipment and men; the pathos of having to treat the wounded and the sick in shacks and even out of doors; the horror of enemy bombardments from the undefended skies, and, above all, the bitter irony of courageous fighters having to retreat, falling back slowly and wearily, their strength, but not their spirits, played out ... because of it this is a picture which it is shocking and maddening to see. But unfortunately Mr. Sandrich has not been able to parallel the reality of the setting with that of his characters ... Probably because the story ... [is] so empty of real dramatic quality, the performances are hackneyed ... However, a strapping new actor by the name of Sonny Tufts does wonders to give credibility and warmth to the scenes in which he plays ... He conveys the essential illusion of being the genuine thing ... Walter Abel, as an Army chaplain, in one brief speech is truer than any of the girls".

Variety's December 31, 1942, review raved: "Mark Sandrich's So Proudly We Hail! is a saga of the war-front nurse and her heroism under fire. As such it glorifies the American Red Cross and presents the wartime nurse, in the midst of unspeakable dangers, physical and spiritual, in a new light. Director-producer Sandrich and scripter Allan Scott have limned a vivid, vital story. It's backgrounded against a realistic romance of how a group of brave American Nightingales came through the hellfire to Australia and thence back to Blighty ... Paulette Goddard does a capital job as running mate ... Sonny Tufts walks off with the picture every time he's on".

=== Modern ===
The film has a 100% rating on Rotten Tomatoes, based on 6 reviews from modern critics, including Matt Bronson: "One of the countless World War II dramas Hollywood produced while the conflict was still raging, this focuses on the American nurses stationed in the Philippines when the fighting there was at its most intense. Yet those who might be tempted to derisively write this off as a 'woman's weepie' had best reconsider, since it's as brutal as Objective, Burma!, Wake Island, or any other he-man WWII offering from the period".

In a 2014 column for The Gaston Gazette, Jessica Pickens praised the film for its realistic depiction of the conditions faced during the war.

In February 2020, Steven Vagg wrote in Diabolique magazine that "Lake's breakdown scene shows her limitations but overall it's a splendidly effective performance, with a spectacular on-screen death – she should have played more death scenes in her career. She had a very good track record in that department".

== Adaptations ==
So Proudly We Hail was adapted for the Lux Radio Theatre on November 1, 1943, with Colbert, Goddard and Lake reprising their original roles.

== Awards ==
The film was nominated for four Academy Awards:

- Best Supporting Actress (Paulette Goddard)
- Best Cinematography
- Best Visual Effects (Farciot Edouart, Gordon Jennings, George Dutton)
- Best Original Screenplay

== Notes ==
- McGilligan, Patrick (1986). "Allan Scott: a nice life". Backstory : interviews with screenwriters of Hollywood's golden age. University of California. pp. 311–333.
