= Sternberg General Hospital =

United States Military Hospital in Manila (Philippines)

Coordinates: 14°35′28.6″N 120°58′57.1″E

Sternberg General Hospital or Department Hospital, Manila P was a United States Military Hospital in Manila in the Philippines during the early part of the 20th century. The hospital was renamed after George Miller Sternberg on June 26, 1920.

== Notable staff ==
Notable staff at the hospital include:

- Inez Haynes

== World War II ==
At the outset of World War II, US Army and US Navy nurses were stationed at Sternberg General Hospital in Manila, and other military hospitals around Manila. During the Battle of the Philippines (1941–42), eighty-eight US Army nurses escaped, in the last week of December 1941, to Corregidor and Bataan.

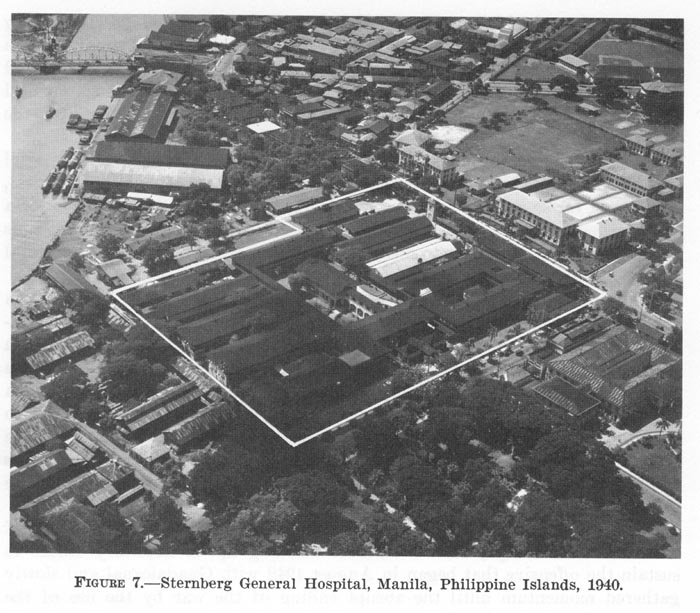
Sternberg General Hospital, Manila, 1940.

Two Army nurses, Lt. Floramund A. Fellmeth and Lt. Florence MacDonald, accompanied severely wounded patients from Sternberg aboard the improvised hospital ship Mactan that departed Manila shortly after midnight of the New Year of 1942 for Australia.

The navy nurses, under the command of Lt. Laura M. Cobb, stayed behind in Manila during the initial invasion to support the patients there. One of them, Ann A. Bernatitus, escaped from Manila to Bataan just before Manila fell. The remaining 11 navy nurses were captured upon the fall of Manila and interned by the Japanese at Santo Tomas.

The Sternberg Hospital was made of wood buildings and was destroyed during the war. The site today is mostly civil buildings.

== See also ==
- Naval Base Manila
