= Ann A. Bernatitus =

U.S. Navy decorated combat nurse (1912–2003)

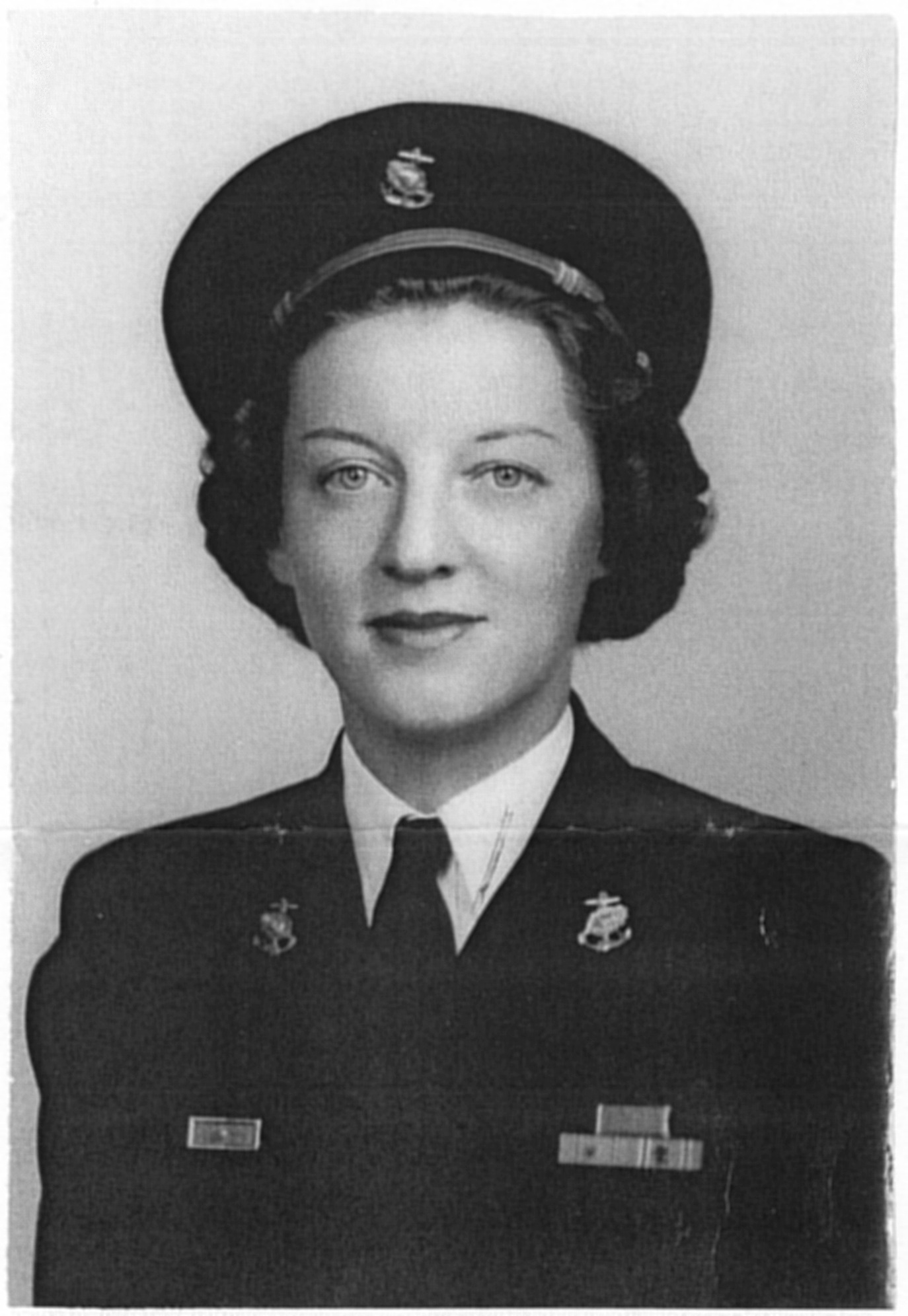
- Ann A. Bernatitus; First American recipient of the Legion of Merit
- Born: January 21, 1912; Exeter, Pennsylvania, U.S.
- Died: March 3, 2003 (aged 91); Wilkes-Barre, Pennsylvania, U.S.
- Burial place: St. Casimir's Cemetery, Pittston, Luzerne County, Pennsylvania
- Military career
- Allegiance: United States of America
- Branch: United States Navy Nurse Corps
- Service years: 1936–1959
- Rank: Captain
- Conflicts: Battle of Bataan; Battle of Corregidor; Battle of Okinawa; World War II
- Awards: Legion of Merit w/ Combat V Presidential Unit Citation; American Defense Service Medal (with star); Asiatic-Pacific Campaign Medal

Ann Agnes Bernatitus (21 January 1912 – 3 March 2003) was a United States Navy nurse who served under combat during World War II. She was the first American recipient of the Legion of Merit.

== Career ==
Ann Bernatitus was appointed as Ensign in the Navy Nurse Corps in 1936, after graduating from the Wyoming Valley Homeopathic Hospital Training School in Wilkes-Barre, Pennsylvania, in 1934, and the University of Pennsylvania's Graduate Hospital post-graduate program in operating room nursing in 1935. Bernatitus's first assignments with the Navy were as a staff nurse at the Naval Hospitals in Chelsea, Massachusetts and Annapolis, Maryland.

In 1940, she was assigned duty on board the USS Chaumont (AP-5) before assignment to the US Naval Hospital at Canacao, Philippines Islands in July 1940. After the attack on Pearl Harbor and start of the Japanese war in the Pacific, Canacoa Hospital staff and patients were evacuated to Manila and Bataan under US Army supervision. As the lone Navy nurse on her team, Bernatitus treated American, Filipino, and Japanese wounded during the Philippines campaign between December and April.

In October 1942, she became the first American recipient of the Legion of Merit, for her heroism during the siege of Bataan and Corregidor from December 1941 through April 1942. She was also the first person authorized to wear the "V" Device with the award.

She was in the last group of the "Angels of Bataan" to be evacuated from the Philippines on the night of May 3 aboard submarine Spearfish just prior to the fall of Corregidor. She served at Bethesda Naval Hospital, New Orleans, Naval Hospital Great Lakes, and San Francisco, then in 1945, as Chief of Nursing Service aboard the hospital ship Relief during the Okinawa campaign.

She was promoted to the rank of Commander on 1 August 1950, and retired from the United States Navy Nurse Corps as a Captain in 1959.

She died at Wilkes-Barre General Hospital, Wilkes-Barre, Pennsylvania on 3 March 2003, and was interred at St. Casimir's Cemetery in Pittston, Luzerne County, Pennsylvania.

== Legacy ==
Captain Bernatitus donated her Legion of Merit medal to the Smithsonian Institution in 1976.

A monument in her honor was dedicated 23 June 2007, at the Exeter Borough Building in her home town.

== Awards ==
- Legion of Merit with "V" device
- American Defense Service Medal with "BASE" clasp
- American Campaign Medal
- Asiatic-Pacific Campaign Medal with one battle star
- World War II Victory Medal
- National Defense Service Medal

=== Legion of Merit Citation ===
The President of the United States of America takes pleasure in presenting the Legion of Merit with Combat "V" to

Lieutenant, Junior Grade Ann A. Bernatitus (NSN: 64916W)

United States Navy

For exceptionally meritorious conduct in the performance of outstanding services to the Government of the United States as a member of Surgical Unit No. 5 during the Japanese attack on the Philippines, December 1941 through April 1942. Nurse Bernatitus maintained her position in the front lines of the Manila-Bataan area rendering efficient and devoted service during the prolonged siege. Miss Bernatitus was regularly attached to the Naval Hospital, Canacao, Philippine Islands having reported for duty there on 20 July 1941. Shortly after hostilities commenced in December 1941 the Naval Hospital Staff and patients were moved to a new establishment in Manila. On 24 December 1941, when Manila was being evacuated Miss Bernatitus accompanied by two Navy Medical Officers proceeded to the Army Hospital at Limay, Bataan. The remainder of the hospital staff stayed in Manila and were taken prisoners. On 25 January 1942, Miss Bernatitus was transferred to Army Field Hospital No. 1 at Little Baguio, Bataan and remained there on active duty until that hospital was destroyed by enemy bombing on 7 April. When Bataan fell Miss Bernatitus was transferred to Corregidor. During her stay in Bataan she worked directly under Lieutenant Commander C. M. Smith (MC), USN, who is now a prisoner of war. The conditions under which the nurses lived and worked lacked everything in the way of comfort. They were constantly exposed to enemy bombing attacks and experienced several as well as the endemic jungle diseases of that area. Miss Bernatitus suffered from both dysentery and beriberi during her tour of duty in Bataan. In spite of all difficulties Miss Bernatitus performed her duty in an exemplary manner with courage and good spirit. She was officially transferred from Corregidor three days before the surrender of that fortress. (Lieutenant, Junior Grade, Bernatitus is authorized to wear the Combat "V".)

== Bibliography ==
- "Anne Agnes Bernatitus: 21 January 1912 - 3 March 2003". Naval History and Heritage Command. 18 March 2016.
