= Rosemary Hogan =

American military nurse

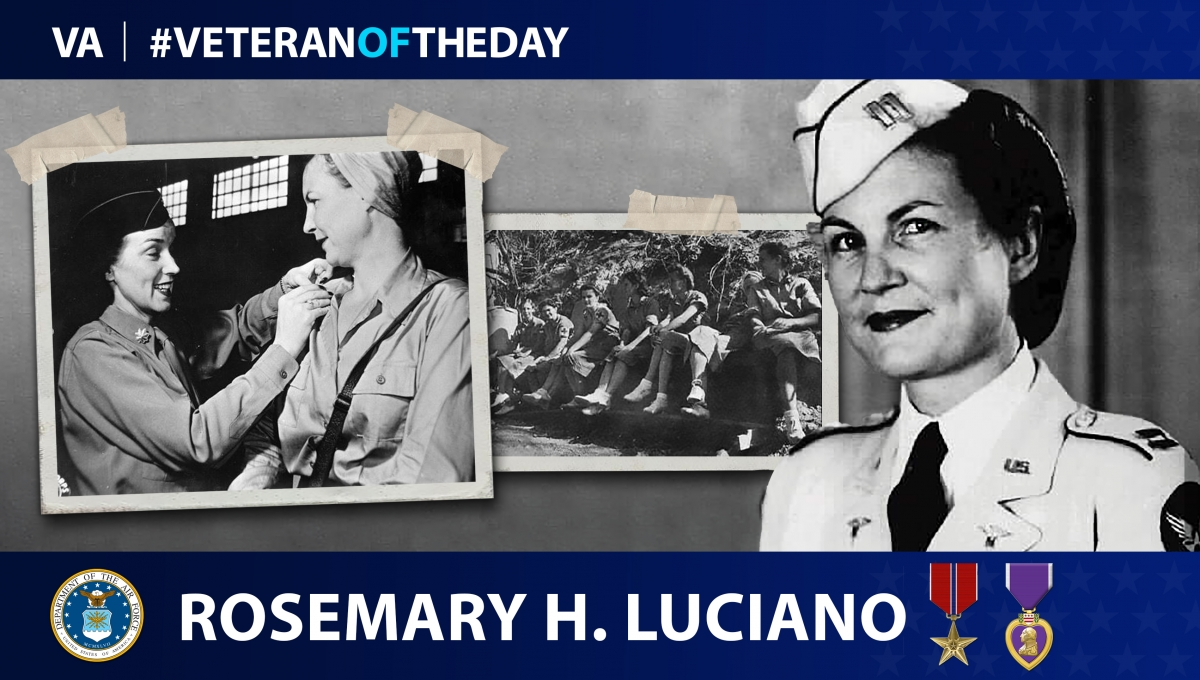
- Born: March 13, 1912; Ahpeatone, Oklahoma
- Died: June 24, 1964 (aged 52); San Antonio, Texas
- Burial place: Arlington National Cemetery
- Other name: Rosemary Luciano
- Alma mater: Scott & White Training School for Nurses
- Spouse: Arnold Luciano
- Military career
- Allegiance: United States
- Branch: U.S. Army Nurse Corps; U.S. Air Force Nurse Corps
- Rank: Colonel
- Known for: One of the Angels of Bataan
- Conflicts: World War II; Philippines campaign (1941–1942); Philippines campaign (1944–1945)
- Awards: Purple Heart

Rosemary Hogan (March 13, 1912 – June 24, 1964) was an American nurse who served in World War II and who was one of the Angels of Bataan.

== Early life and education ==
Rosemary Hogan was born on March 13, 1912, to Francis and Mary Hogan in Ahpeatone, Oklahoma. She graduated from Chattanooga High school where she was the class valedictorian in 1930. She earned a scholarship to attend the Scott & White Training School for Nurses in Temple, Texas.

== Military career ==
Hogan joined the U.S. Army Nurse Corps at Fort Sill in 1936 and was stationed there until April 1940.

=== World War II ===
In April 1940, Hogan was deployed to Fort Stotsenburg in the Commonwealth of the Philippines. On December 7, 1941, the Empire of Japan attacked the Philippines and Hogan served as one of the Angels of Bataan. She was the nurse in charge during the establishment of the military hospital at Limay. In January 1942, the hospital was moved inland.

On March 30, 1942, Hogan was injured by shrapnel during bombing raid; she later received the Purple Heart for the injury. On April 29, she was ordered to Australia to recover, but her plane was damaged and she was captured by Japanese forces at Mindanao. She was held at the Santo Tomas Internment Camp until 1945 when it was liberated by American forces.

=== Post-war career ===
Hogan transferred to the U.S. Air Force Nurse Corps after World War II. She was the chief nurse at Keesler Air Force Base and Joint Base Langley–Eustis. She retired as a colonel, one of the first women to achieve the rank.

== Personal life and death ==
Hogan married United States Air Force Major Arnold Luciano. She died on June 24, 1964, in San Antonio, Texas and was buried at Arlington National Cemetery. In October 1978, Hogan Hall at Sheppard Air Force Base was named in her honor and in November 1997 she was inducted into the Oklahoma Aviation and Space Hall of Fame. In 2019, she was inducted into the Oklahoma Military Hall of Fame.
