= Nancy Belle Craft Norton =

American educator

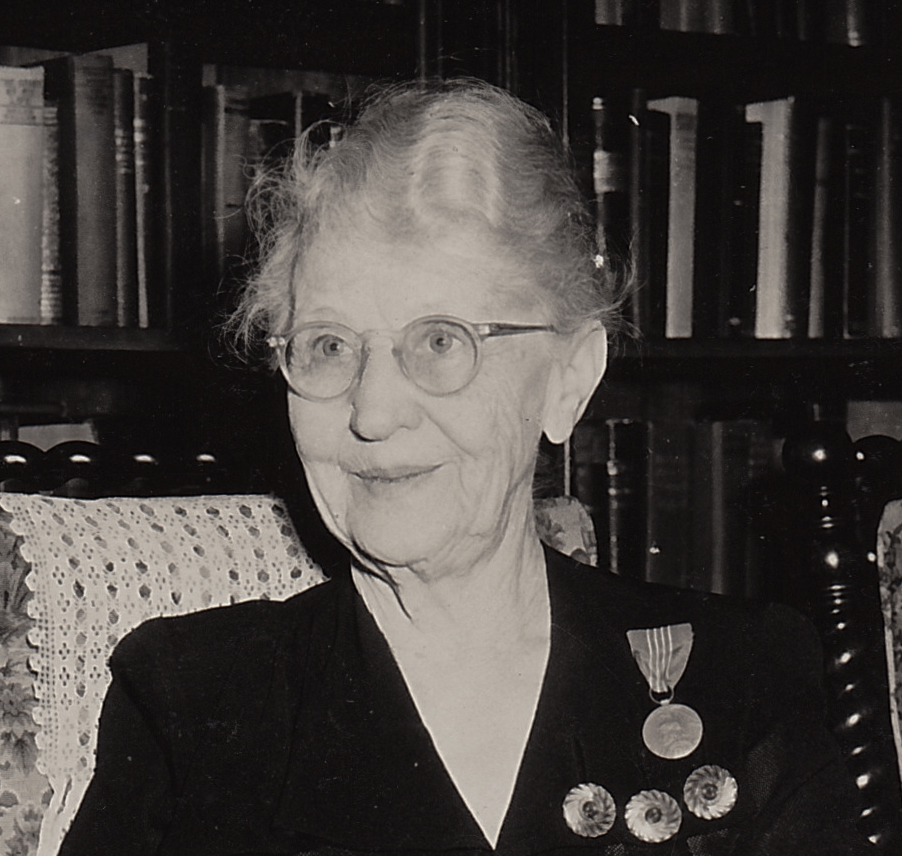
Nancy Belle Craft Norton photographed during the 1950s after receiving the Medal of Freedom. Provided by the Center for Pacific War Studies, National Museum of the Pacific War, Fredericksburg, TX.

Nancy Belle Craft Norton (August 4, 1872 – December 1, 1963) was employed by the U.S. Government to teach at Manila High School in the Philippines when war with Japan was declared in 1941. During the Japanese occupation of the Philippines, she aided internees and prisoners of war by supplying them with urgently needed medical supplies, food, clothing and other items. General Jonathan M. Wainwright personally awarded her the Medal of Freedom in 1947 for her efforts during the war.

== Early life ==
Nancy Belle Craft was born in Keokuk County, Iowa to Elijah J. Craft and Nancy J. Meyers Craft. Her father was an itinerant farm worker and moved his family to Kansas by covered wagon in 1885. At the age of sixteen, Nancy married John G. Norton and became a homemaker and mother. They settled in Lincoln County, Kansas and three children were born to the couple, Mamie Belle Norton (1888-1985), Clement Wilbur Norton (1893-1957) and Victor Kenneth Norton (1904-1907). Nancy divorced sometime after the passing of their third child and moved with her two remaining children to Manhattan, Kansas by 1910. Both mother and daughter eventually decided to become educators and moved to Seattle, Washington to receive training. Nancy worked the first year while Mamie attended school and the following year roles were reversed. They did this until each completed the program.

== Career ==
During 1923, both Nancy and Mamie were hired by the U.S. government to be educators at schools in the Philippines. At that time, education in the Philippines was under close examination by the Measurement and Research Division of Public Schools and by the Monroe Commission, which were initiated by the Philippine legislature. Nancy and Mamie arrived right before recommendations from the commission were implemented. Within the first few years of living on the island of Luzon, Mamie met and married fellow educator Roscoe E. Lautzenhiser and began a family of her own. During the next eighteen years, both mother and daughter lived and worked in and near Manila.

== World War II ==
When the Japanese occupation of the Philippines began in 1942, Nancy Belle Norton, her daughter, son-in-law and granddaughter, Elizabeth, were swept up in the aftermath. Because of her age (69) and sleight appearance (less than 100lbs) Nancy was not considered a serious threat by Japanese authorities. The other members of her family were sent to Santo Tomas Internment Camp with other American civilians and foreign nationals that were imprisoned there. Her house, located near Manila, was confiscated by Japanese authorities and Filipino friends offered their own homes for shelter during the following two and a half years.

After witnessing the plight of American P.O.W.s and learning about the conditions under which her family was held, Nancy, eventually known as “Miss Nancy Belle” by P.O.W.s and internees, decided to do what she could to help them. Due to her freedom, selflessness and persistence she was able to successfully persevere while dealing with Japanese authorities at the following camps: Bilibid, Pasay, Santo Tomas, Clark Field, Cabanatuan and other locations she attempted to enter. The supplies and food that she brought by kalesa made captivity survivable for hundreds of individuals.

One of many post war testimonials about “Miss Nancy Belle” was offered by Army Chaplain Perry O. Wilcox, who was held at Bilibid Internment / P.O.W. Camp. He wrote that she would “plead and argue and resist the opposition of the Japanese authorities until they gave way and let her bring in what she had brought… She never tired and never gave up.”

After U.S. forces landed at Leyte in 1944, Nancy was sent by Japanese authorities to Santo Tomas to live with her family. By planting a victory garden in the camp and contributing its produce to the food pantry she continued to aid others until the liberation of Santo Tomas by Filipino guerillas and elements of the U.S. 1st Cavalry Division on February 3, 1945.

== Post-War life ==
Nancy Belle Craft Norton returned to the U.S. in 1946. During a simple ceremony at Oklahoma City, Oklahoma in April 1947, General Jonathan M. Wainwright presented her with the highest citation that could be given to a civilian by the U.S. government, the Medal of Freedom. Before and after the presentation, dozens of former internees and prisoners of war related their knowledge of the good deeds performed by “Miss Nancy Belle” in the Philippines. During the following decade, Nancy lived with relatives on the west coast of the U.S. and during her final years she received care at a nursing home near San Diego, California.

== Death ==
After suffering from a series of medical issues and a fall, which caused her left hip to break, Nancy Belle Craft Norton died at the age of 91 in a San Diego hospital on December 1, 1963.
