= Malinta Tunnel =

Military tunnel complex in the Philippines

- Corregidor, Philippines
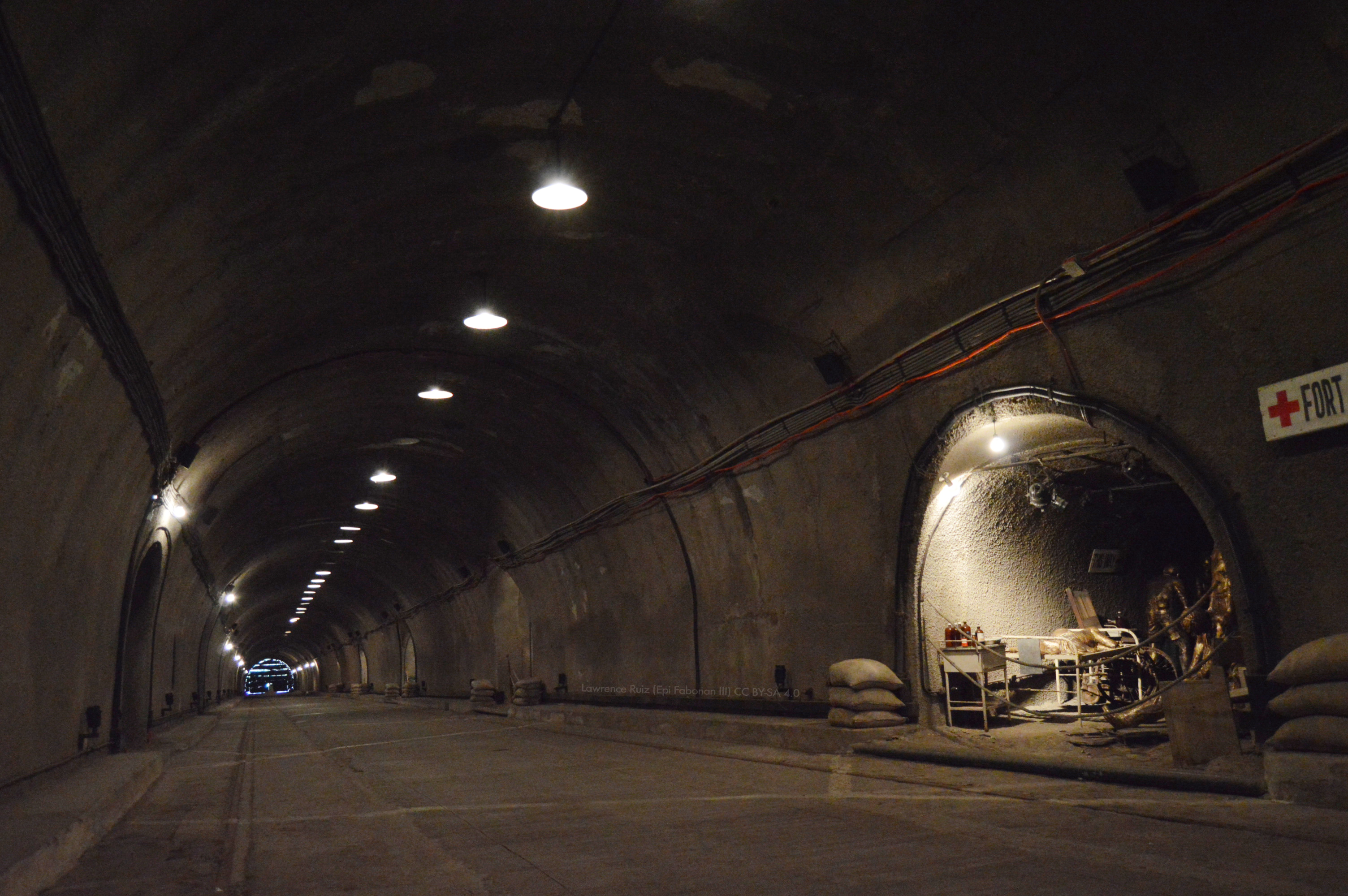
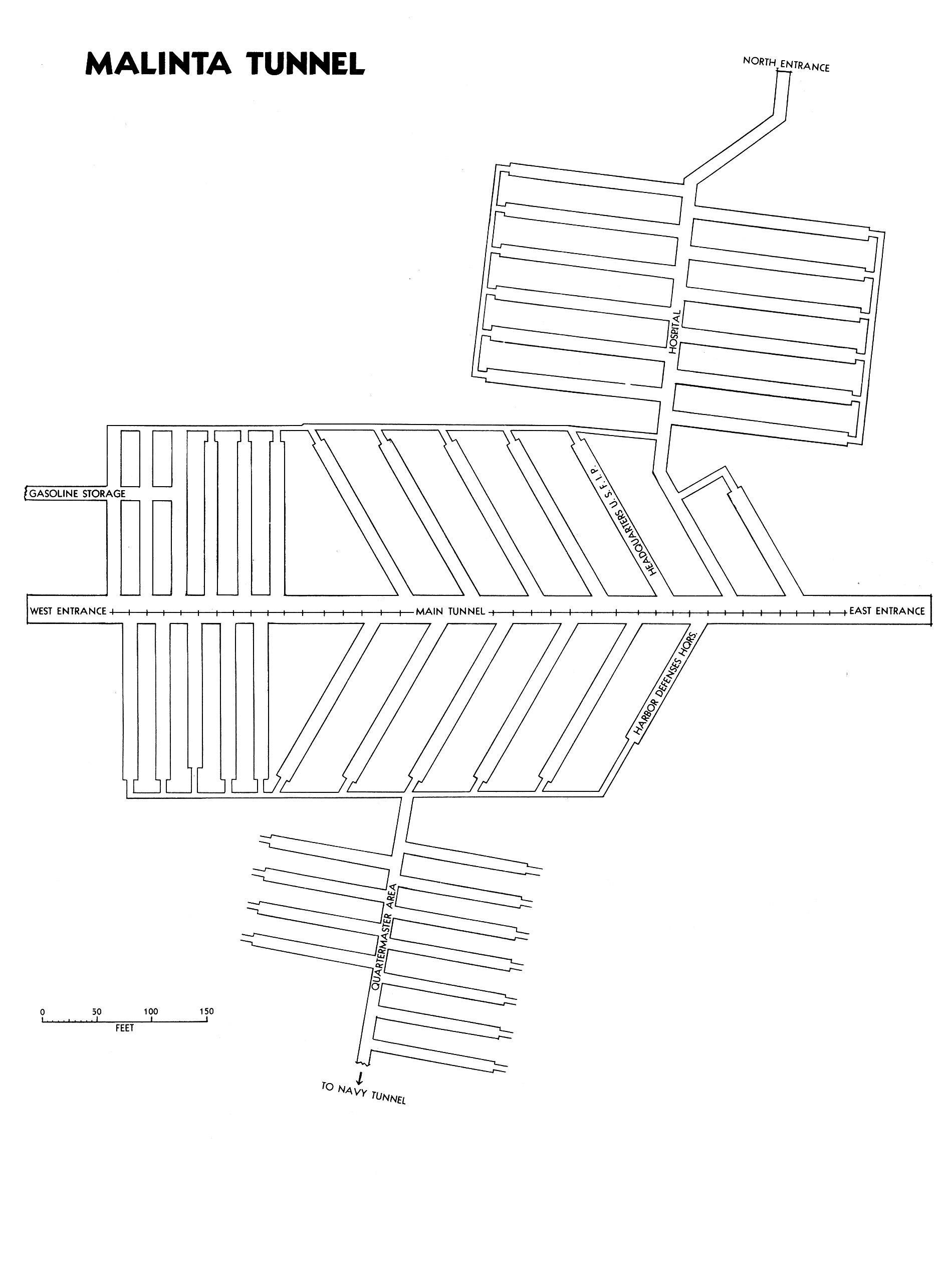
- Malinta Tunnel in March 2019 Diagram of the Malinta Tunnel layout

Site information
- Type: Bunker, underground hospital
- Controlled by: United States

Location
- Coordinates: 14°23′15″N 120°35′21″E

Site history
- Built: 1922–32
- In use: 1932–45
- Materials: Concrete
- Battles/wars: Battle of Corregidor; Battle of Corregidor (1945)

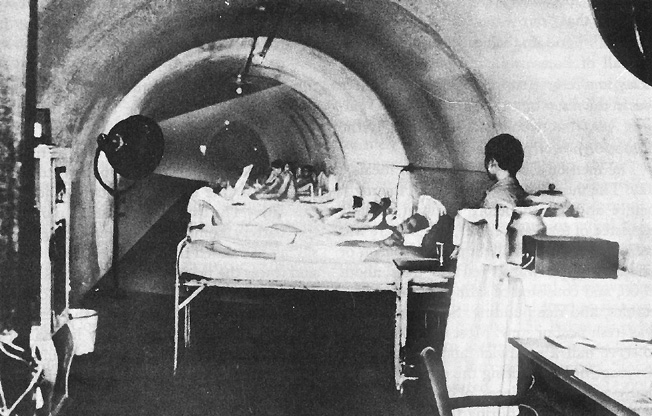
Hospital lateral in the Malinta Tunnel

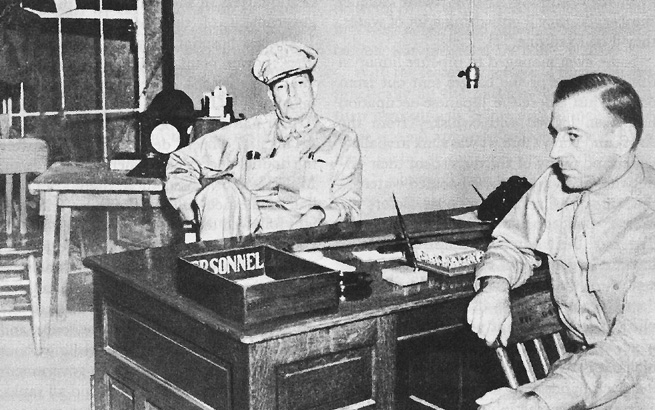
Generals Douglas MacArthur and Richard K. Sutherland at USAFFE Headquarters, Malinta Tunnel, 1 March 1942

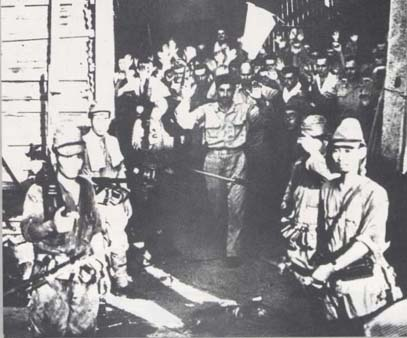
Surrender of U.S. forces at the Malinta Tunnel on 6 May 1942

The Malinta Tunnel is a tunnel complex built by the United States Army Corps of Engineers on the island of Corregidor in the Philippines. It was initially used as a bomb-proof storage and personnel bunker, but was later equipped as a 1,000-bed hospital. The main tunnel, running east to west, is 831 feet (253 m) long, 24 feet (7.3 m) wide and 18 feet (5.5 m) high. Branching off from this main shaft are 13 lateral tunnels on the north side and 11 lateral tunnels on the south side. Each lateral averaged 160 feet (49 m) in length and 15 feet (4.6 m) in width.

== Name ==
The Malinta Tunnel derives its name from Malinta Hill, a 390-foot (120 m) rise through which its shaft is bored. Malinta is Tagalog for "many leeches", linta being the local word for "leech".

== Construction ==
Its construction, without benefit of new equipment or funds apportioned by the United States Congress due to agreements reached during the Washington Naval Conference, began in 1932 and the main tunnel and 25 laterals were completed in 1934. Other construction on laterals continued right up to the start of the war.

The Army Corps of Engineers rented obsolete equipment from Baguio gold miners for a nominal fee and made do with condemned TNT from the Ordnance Department. The explosive delivered was in powder form, and had to be wrapped into makeshift cartridges using magazine pages, which were placed into holes drilled into the rock. Labor was provided by the Philippine Commonwealth in the form of 1,000 convicts from the Bilibid Prison in Manila. A company of engineers from the Philippine Scouts worked on the construction as foremen and clerks.

The cement for concrete used to line the tunnels was bought from the Japanese.

== Battle of Corregidor ==
During the Battle of Corregidor, the third lateral on the north side from the east entrance served as the headquarters of General Douglas MacArthur and the USAFFE. Malinta Tunnel also served as the seat of government of the Commonwealth of the Philippines. At the vicinity of the tunnel's west entrance in the afternoon of 30 December 1941, Manuel L. Quezon and Sergio Osmeña took their oaths of office as President and Vice-president of the Philippine Commonwealth in simple ceremonies attended by members of the garrison.

Japanese troops forced the surrender of the remaining American and Filipino forces on 6 May 1942 while under the command of Lt. Gen. Jonathan Wainwright.

== Retaking of Corregidor ==
During the re-taking of the island by U.S. forces in 1945, Japanese soldiers who had been trapped in the tunnel after the entrance was blocked as a result of gunfire from USS Converse (DD-509) began committing suicide by detonating explosives within the tunnel complex the night of 23 February 1945. The collapsed laterals resulting from these explosions have never been excavated.

== Today ==
Today, Malinta Tunnel is the venue of an audio-visual presentation by National Artist Lamberto V. Avellana of events that occurred during World War II, including the evacuation of President Quezon and General MacArthur by Motor Torpedo Boat Squadron Three from Corregidor to Mindanao. They were later flown to Australia. Quezon ran a government in exile in the United States during the war.

A plaque in the Malinta Tunnel now marks a spot on the island of Corregidor.

== See also ==
- Angels of Bataan
- Bunker
