= Laura M. Cobb =

Member of the U.S. Navy Nurse Corps (1892–1981)

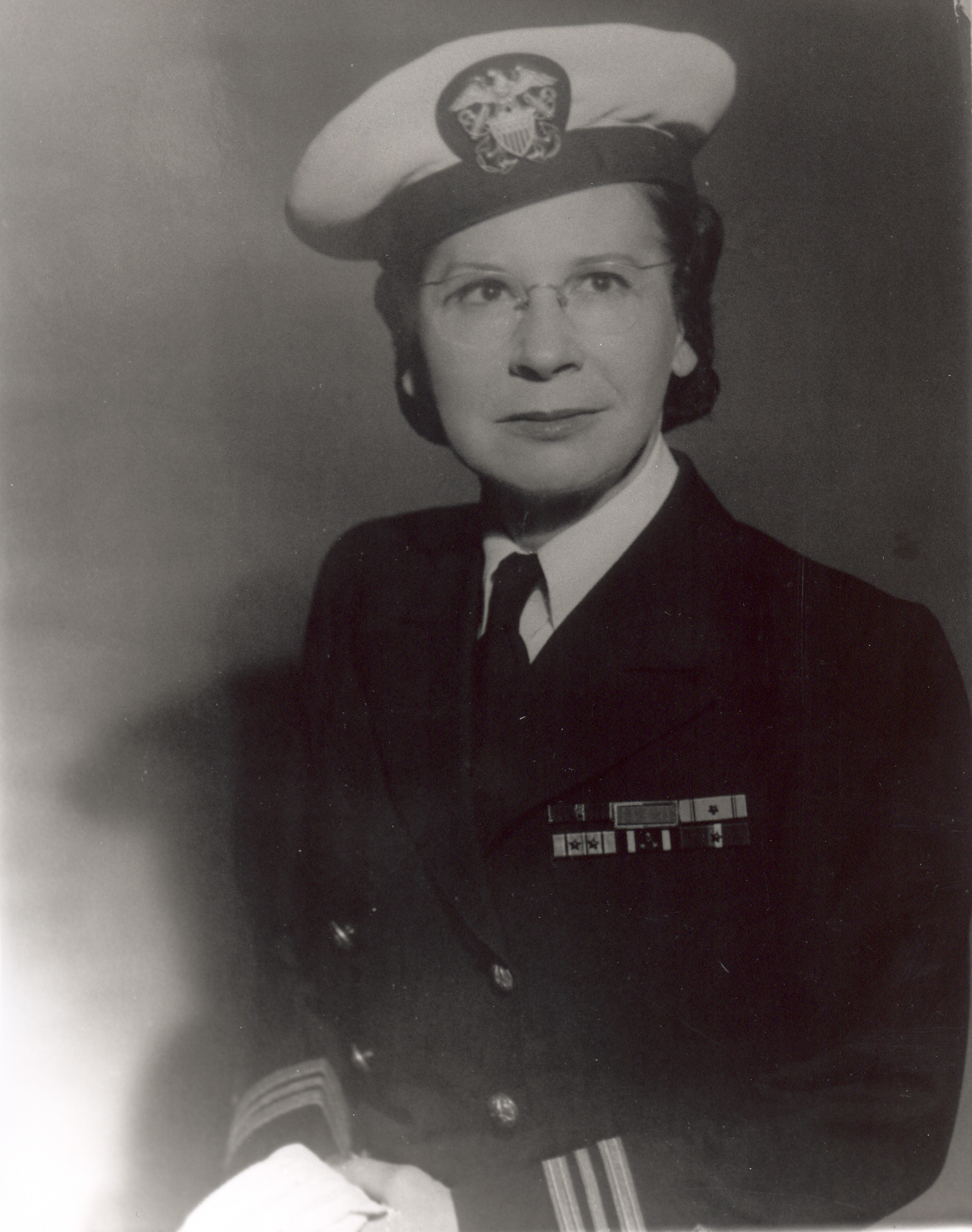
- Lt. Cdr. Laura M. Cobb; Chief Nurse, USN, and one of the "Angels of Bataan"
- Born: May 11, 1892; Atchison, Kansas, U.S.
- Died: September 27, 1981 (aged 89); Wichita, Kansas, U.S.
- Burial place: Maple Grove Cemetery, Wichita, Kansas
- Military career
- Allegiance: United States Navy
- Branch: United States Navy Nurse Corps
- Service years: 1918–1921 and 1924–1947
- Rank: Lieutenant commander
- Conflicts: Battle of Bataan; World War II
- Awards: Bronze Star Medal with Gold Star; Presidential Unit Citation; Asiatic-Pacific Campaign Medal with two Battle Stars

Laura Mae Cobb (May 11, 1892 – September 27, 1981) was a member of the United States Navy Nurse Corps who served during World War II. She received numerous decorations for her actions as a POW of the Japanese, during which she continued to serve as chief nurse for eleven other imprisoned Navy nurses—known as the "Sacred Twelve" that were captured in Manila, some 3 1/2 and 4 1/2 months before Bataan and Corregidor fell to the Japanese. She retired from the Nurse Corps as a lieutenant commander in 1947.

== Early years ==
Laura Cobb was born in Atchison, Kansas, on May 11, 1892, and moved with her family to Mulvane, Kansas (near Wichita) the following year. She graduated from Mulvane High School in 1910, taught school for a time, entered the nursing training program at Wesley Hospital in Wichita in 1915, and graduated from that program in 1918.

== Interwar service ==
Cobb served as a nurse in the United States Navy from July 5, 1918, to July 21, 1921 (including brief service at the Canacao Naval Hospital in Manila at the end of World War I), and then worked in civilian hospitals in Iowa and Michigan for three years. She rejoined the Navy in April 1924 and served in naval hospitals throughout the U.S. in the 1920s and 1930s. After serving for more than a decade in a naval hospital in Washington, D.C., rumors of war prompted her to request "to go overseas because someone had to go." She was subsequently transferred to the naval hospital on Guam in April 1940, where she received a commendation for "continuous duty for forty-eight hours, during which she repeatedly risked life and limb in her efforts to insure the safety and comfort of the patients..." during the typhoon of November 3, 1940.

== World War II ==
Cobb transferred from Guam to the Philippines in February 1941, where she was again assigned—now as Chief Nurse—to the Canacao Naval Hospital in Manila (located next to the Cavite Navy Yard). When the Japanese attacked the Cavite Navy Yard on December 10, 1941, Cobb and ten other navy nurses remained with the wounded in Manila until the U.S. military there surrendered to the Japanese on January 2, 1942. Cobb's quiet, professional manner was reassuring to the other nurses and apparently respected by the Japanese. When ordered by their captors to inventory medical supplies, Cobb instructed the nurses to mislabel valuable quinine as mere soda bicarbonate to preserve the quinine for the treatment of malaria patients.

=== Santo Tomas ===
After capture, Cobb and the other eleven navy nurses were eventually transferred to and imprisoned by the Japanese at Santo Tomas University, which became known as the Santo Tomas Internment Camp. During the transfer, Cobb hid the nurses' records under her uniform to hide them from their guards. Eventually, Cobb was named superintendent of the Santo Tomas hospital. The navy nurses continued to serve as a nursing unit at Santo Tomas, caring for the more than 3,500 civilian internees there, and eventually being joined by 66 Army nurses captured after the Battle of Corregidor in July 1942.

=== Los Baños ===
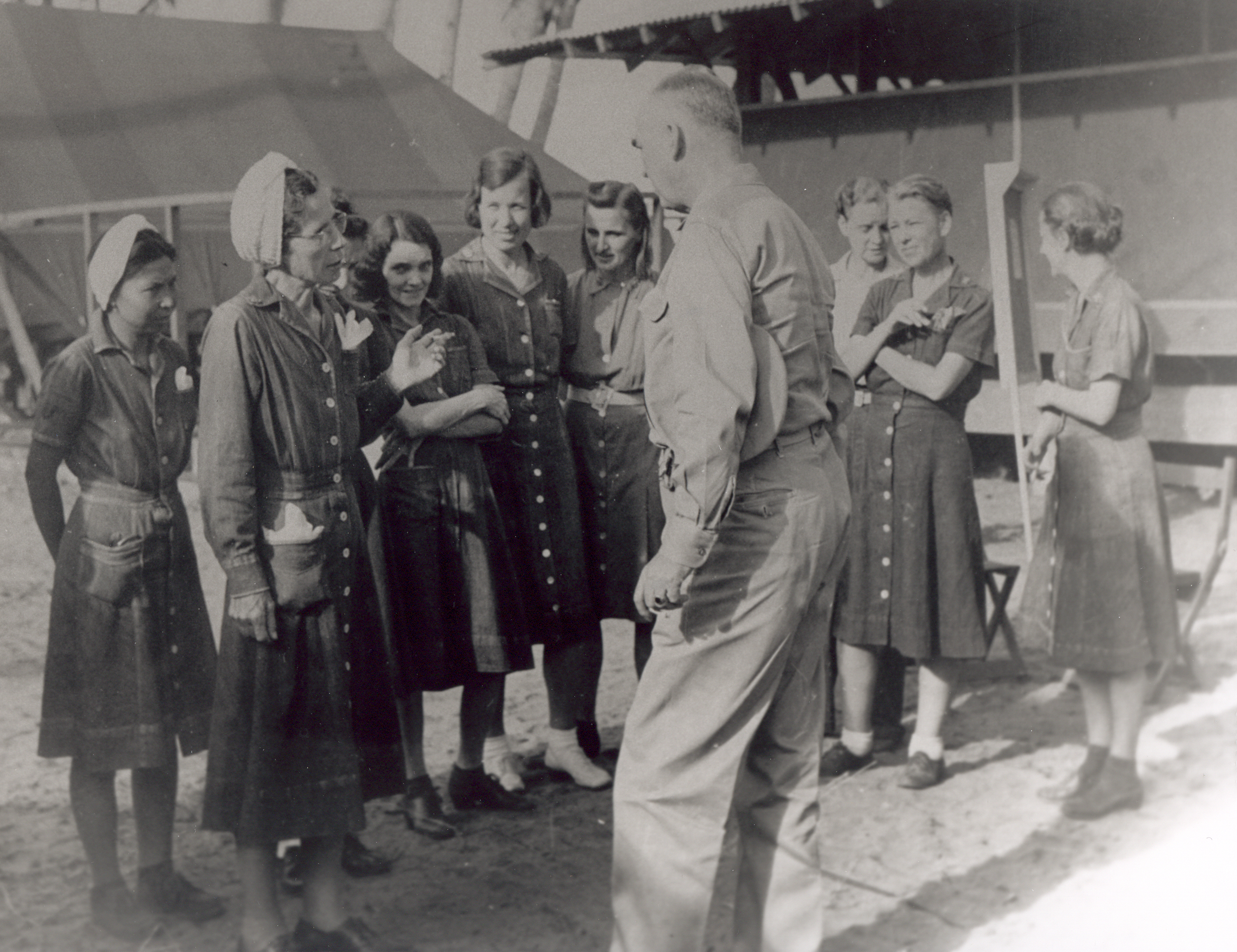
Chief Nurse Laura Cobb speaking to Vice Admiral Thomas Kinkaid after rescue from Los Baños

In May 1943 the navy nurses volunteered to help establish a new concentration camp at Los Baños. Cobb again hid all their military records under her blouse, wearing a lei around her neck to help conceal them. The nurses created a makeshift hospital and the camp began receiving more civilian prisoners, including children afflicted with measles, chicken pox, and diphtheria. Through the rest of 1943 and all of 1944 camp conditions progressively worsened, with the nurses working 12-hour shifts and treating as many as 200 patients a day for diseases such as beriberi, dysentery, and tuberculosis. The navy nurses at Los Baños eventually came to be known as "The Twelve Anchors."

During their last three months of captivity, the internees, including the nurses, were fed less than 900 calories a day. Their diet was ultimately diminished to 250 to 300 grams of unhusked rice per day, of which Cobb later said: "We got so we didn't especially mind the weevils, but the cockroaches and worms made eating tough going much of the time." Cobb was remembered by her nurses for providing constant encouragement. Finally, the internees and all eleven of the navy nurses, including Cobb, were liberated by a combination of U.S. Army Airborne and Filipino guerilla forces in the Raid at Los Baños on February 23, 1945.

Upon evacuation to Guam, Cobb, who had lost 35 pounds during her captivity, said: "I want to return to the Philippines...." The nurses were nevertheless returned to the United States, where Cobb was promoted to lieutenant commander and awarded the Bronze Star, a Gold Star in lieu of a second Bronze Star, the Defense of Philippines Ribbon, a Distinguished Army Unit Citation, and the Asiatic-Pacific Theater Ribbon with two Battle Stars.

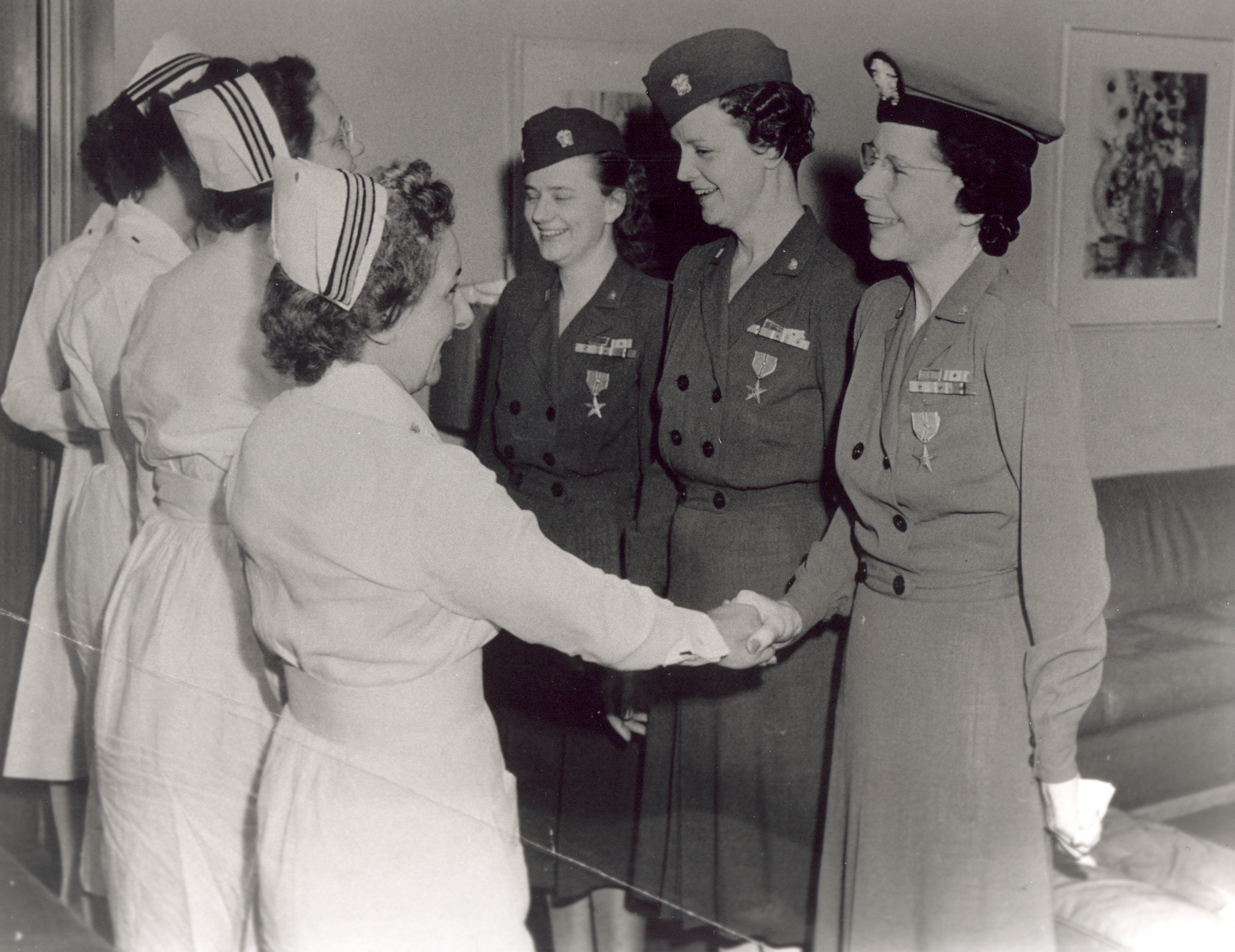
Laura Cobb, standing, far right

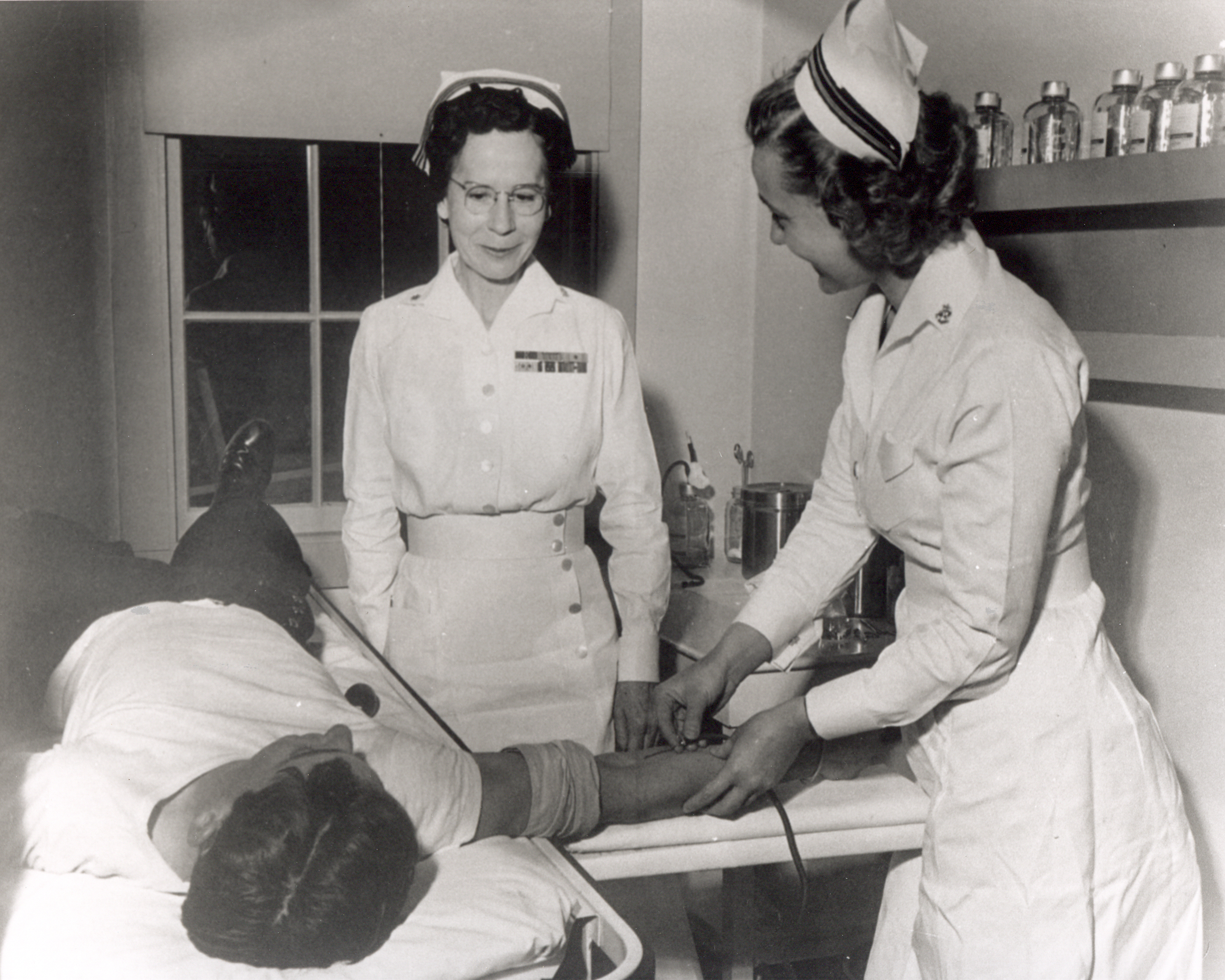
Laura Cobb, standing, center

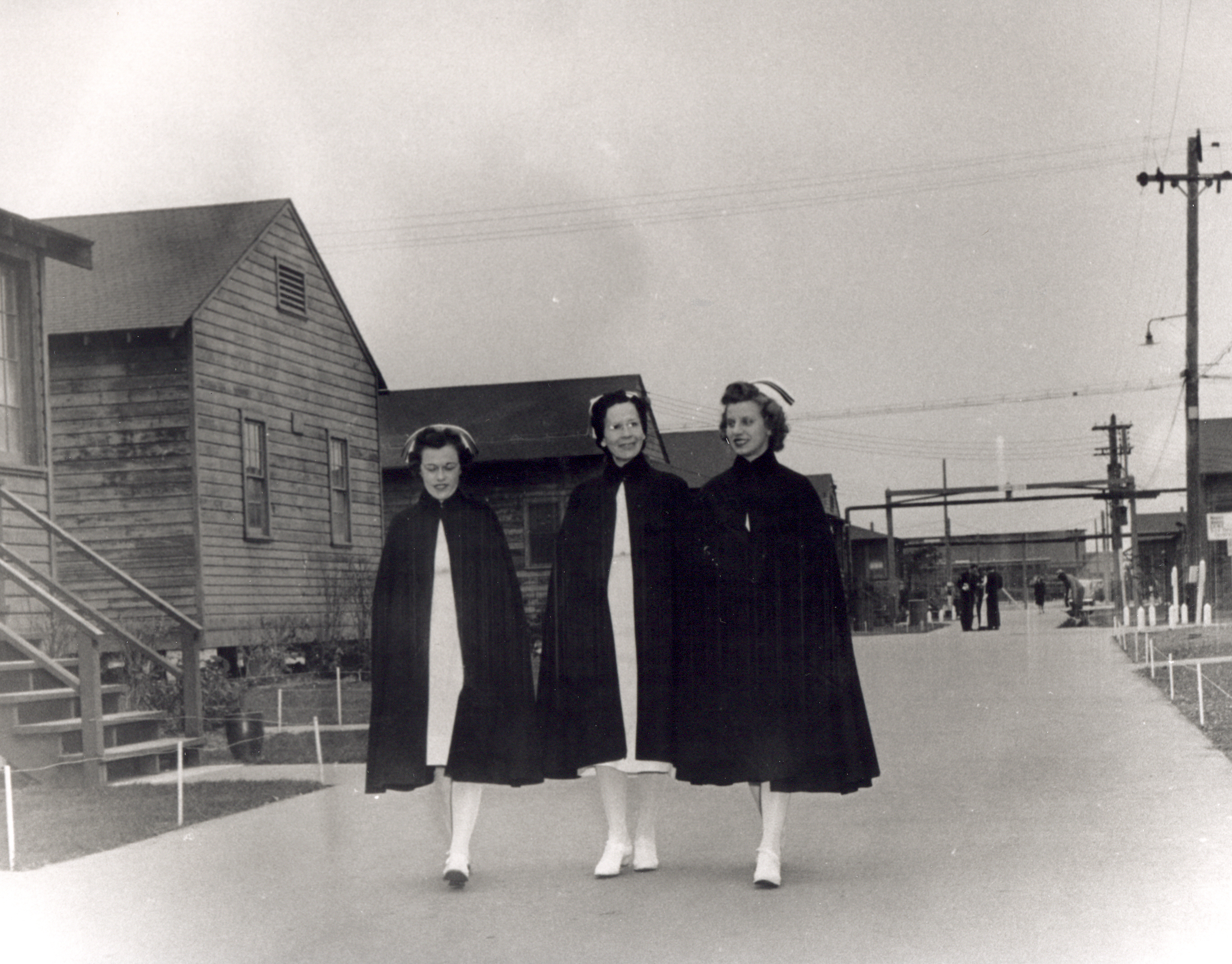
Laura Cobb, walking, center.

The Wightman family of Evansville, Indiana, also imprisoned at Los Baños, later said of the navy nurses: "We are absolutely certain that had it not been for these nurses many of us who are alive and well would have died." Nurse Mary Rose Harrington later said of her experience: "I was young and in good health but I do thank the good Lord and my Chief Nurse, Laura Cobb for surviving as well as I did."

== Later years ==
Cobb retired from the Navy in 1947 for health reasons and worked in a sanatorium in Los Angeles. She moved back to Wichita in 1974, and died there in September 1981.

Maj. Maude C. Davison, the Army Chief Nurse at Corregidor and Santo Tomas, was posthumously awarded the Distinguished Service Medal on August 20, 2001. A similar effort has not yet been undertaken for Chief Nurse Laura M. Cobb.
