= Sue S. Dauser =

United States Navy Nurse Corps Superintendent

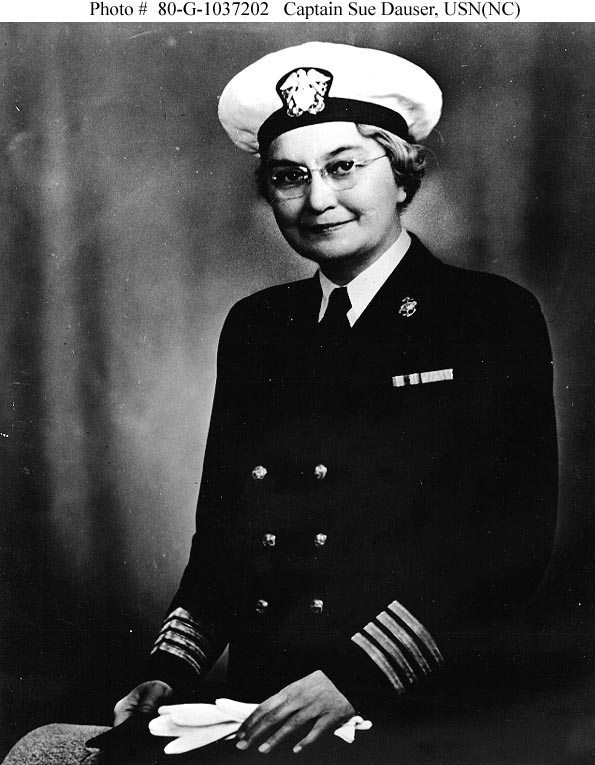
- CAPT Sue S. Dauser, USN (NC)
- Born: September 20, 1888; Anaheim, California, U.S.
- Died: March 11, 1972 (aged 83)
- Military career
- Allegiance: United States of America
- Branch: Navy, Nurse Corps
- Service years: 1917 – 1945
- Rank: Captain
- Units: USS Relief, USS Argonne, USS Henderson
- Commands: Superintendent of the United States Navy Nurse Corps
- Conflicts: World War I, World War II
- Awards: Navy Distinguished Service Medal

Sue S. Dauser was the fifth Superintendent of the United States Navy Nurse Corps, guiding the Nurse Corps through World War II.

== Early life ==
Dauser was born in Anaheim, California, on 20 September 1888. She graduated from the California Hospital School of Nursing in 1914.

== Navy Nurse Corps career ==
Dauser became a Navy Nurse in September 1917, subsequently serving with Naval Base Hospital Number 3 in the U.S. and in Edinburgh, Scotland during World War I, holding the grade of Chief Nurse for most of that period. Following World War I, she was placed in charge of nursing activities at the U.S. Naval Hospital at San Diego, California. During the 1920s, Chief Nurse Dauser served on board several ships and in overseas billets in Guam and the Philippines as well as in naval hospitals in the U.S. She tended President Warren G. Harding during his fatal illness in 1923.

In the 1930s, Dauser was principal chief nurse at several Navy medical facilities.

== Contributions as superintendent ==
Dauser was appointed superintendent of the Navy Nurse Corps in 1939. Serving in that capacity throughout the Second World War, she supervised the great wartime expansion of the corps and its activities throughout the world. Under her administration, the membership of the corps grew from 436 to over 11,000 by 1945. In July 1942, she was invested with the permanent relative rank of lieutenant commander. In December, she received the temporary relative rank of captain, the first woman to receive this rank in the history of the US Navy. In February 1944, her relative captaincy was changed to actual commission for the duration of the war plus 6 months. Captain Dauser was awarded the Navy Distinguished Service Medal for her work as Superintendent during World War II.

== Later life ==
Dauser died on 11 March 1972.

Preceded by Myn M. Hoffman	Superintendent, Navy Nurse Corps; 1939-1945	Succeeded by Nellie Jane DeWitt
