= United States Navy Nurse Corps =

Medical division of the United States Navy

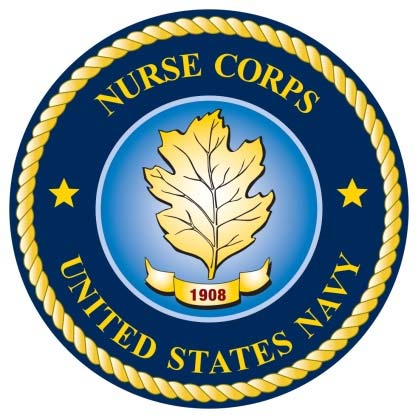
- Seal of the United States Navy Nurse Corps
- Founded: 1908; 118 years ago
- Country: United States of America
- Branch: United States Navy

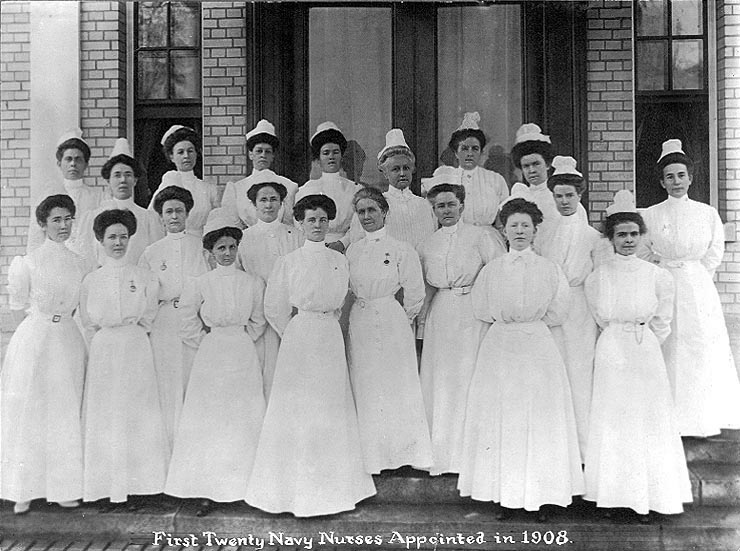
Group photograph of the first twenty Navy nurses, appointed in 1908

The United States Navy Nurse Corps was officially established by Congress in 1908; however, unofficially, women had been working as nurses aboard Navy ships and in Navy hospitals for nearly 100 years. The Corps was all-female until 1965.

== Pre-1908 ==
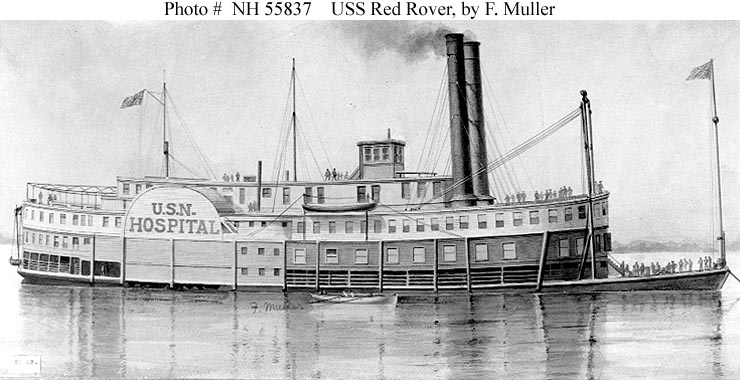
USS Red Rover by F. Muller

In 1811, William P.C. Barton became the first to officially recommend that female nurses be added to naval hospital staff. However, it wasn't until 19 June 1861 that a Navy Department circular order finally established the designation of Nurse, to be filled by junior enlisted men. Fifteen years later, the duties were transferred to the designation Bayman (US Navy Regulations, 1876). Although enlisted personnel were referred to as nurses, their duties and responsibilities were more related to those of a hospital corpsman.

During the American Civil War, several African American women served as paid crew aboard the hospital ship Red Rover in the Mississippi River area in the position of nurse. The known names of four nurses are: Alice Kennedy, Sarah Kinno, Ellen Campbell and Betsy Young (Fowler). In addition volunteer nuns from the Catholic Sisters of the Holy Cross served aboard as nurses.

During the 1898 Spanish–American War, the Navy employed a modest number of female contract nurses in its hospitals ashore through the DAR Hospital Corps and sent trained male nurses to sea on the hospital ship Solace.

== 1908–1917 ==
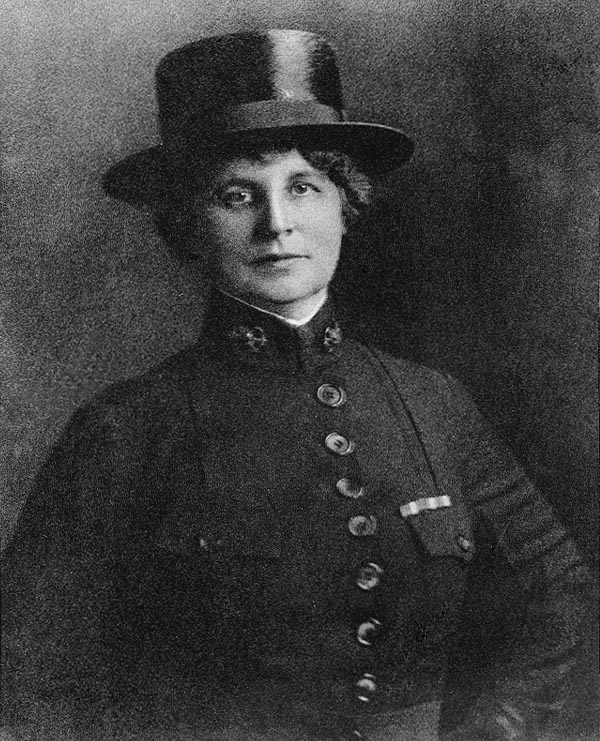
Lenah H. Sutcliffe Higbee

After the establishment of the Nurse Corps in 1908 by an Act of Congress, twenty women were selected as the first members and assigned to the Naval Medical School Hospital in Washington, D.C. Unfortunately, the navy did not provide room or board for them, and so the nurses—being a determined lot—rented their own house and provided their own meals.

In time, the nurses would come to be known as "The Sacred Twenty" because they were the first women to serve formally as members of the Navy. The "Sacred Twenty", as shown in the photo at the top of this page, were Mary H. Du Bose; Adah M. Pendleton; Elizabeth M. Hewitt; Della V. Knight; Josephine Beatrice Bowman, the third Superintendent of the Navy Nurse Corps, 1922–1935; Lenah H. Sutcliffe Higbee, the second Superintendent of the Navy Nurse Corps, 1911–1922; Esther Voorhees Hasson, the first Superintendent of the Navy Nurse Corps, 1908–1911; Martha E. Pringle; Elizabeth J. Wells; Clare L. De Ceu.; Elizabeth Leonhardt; Estelle Hine; Ethel R. Parsons; Florence T. Milburn; Boniface T. Small; Victoria White; Isabelle Rose Roy; Margaret D. Murray; Sara B. Myer; and Sara M. Cox. They would include three Nurse Corps Superintendents and twelve chief nurses.

The Nurse Corps gradually expanded to 160 on the eve of World War I. In addition to normal hospital and clinic duties, the nurses were active in training natives in U.S. overseas possessions as well as the Navy's male enlisted medical personnel. For a few months in 1913, Navy nurses saw their first shipboard service, aboard Mayflower and Dolphin. The first permanent shipboard positions came in late 1920, when Relief went into commission with a medical staff that included Navy nurses.

== World War I ==
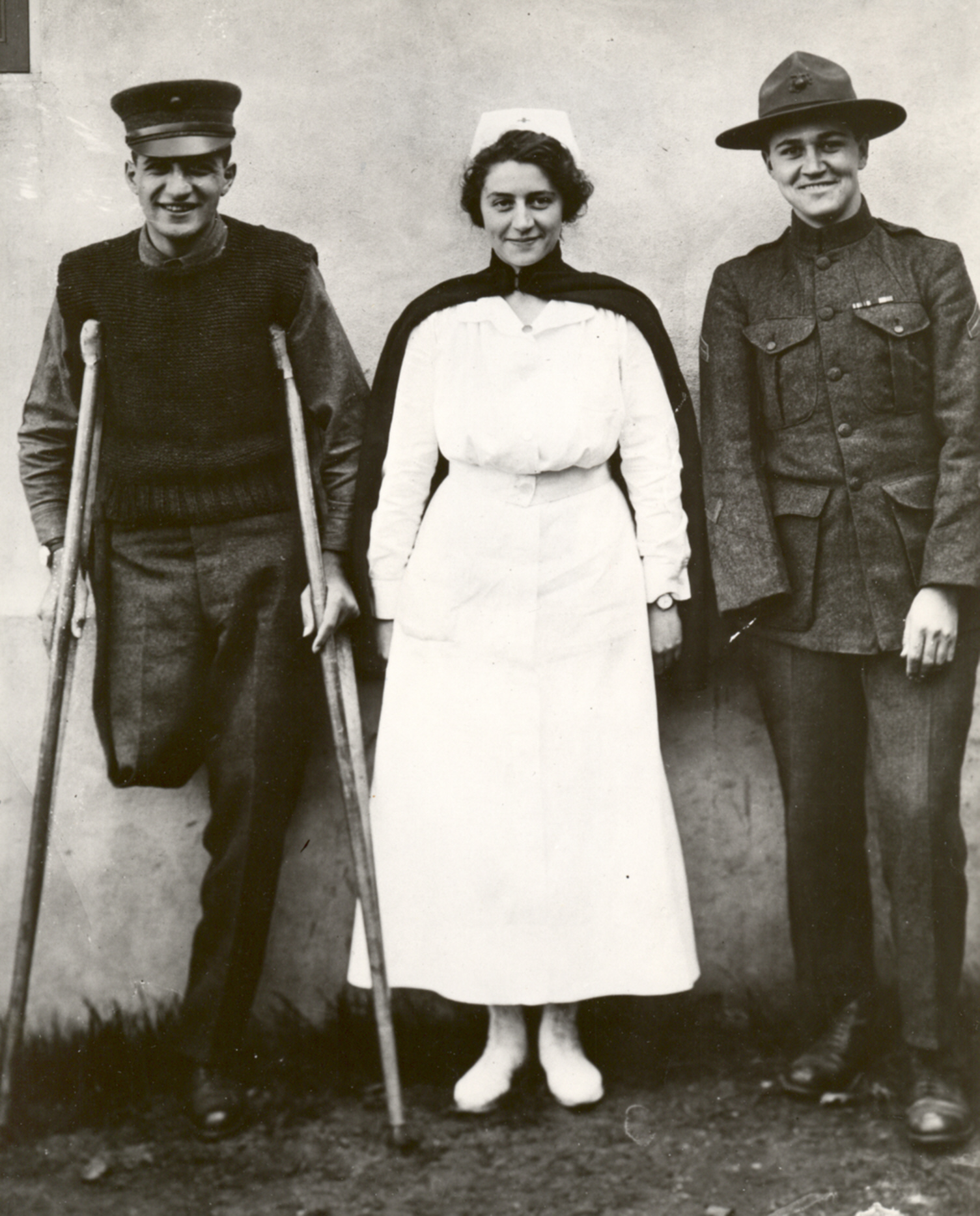
Nurse Hazel Herringshaw and two Marine Corps patients, 1918

The entry of the United States into the First World War brought a great expansion of the Nurse Corps, both regular and reserve.

In 1917–18, the Navy deployed five base hospital units to operational areas in France, Scotland and Ireland, with the first in place by late 1917. Also serving overseas were Navy operating teams, including nurses, established for detached duty near the combat frontlines. Some of these teams were loaned to the United States Army during the intense ground offensives of 1918 and worked in difficult field conditions far removed from regular hospitals.

During the war, 19 Navy nurses died on active duty, over half of them from influenza. Three of the four Navy Crosses awarded to wartime Navy nurses were given posthumously to women who sacrificed their lives during the 1918 flu pandemic. Among those awarded the Navy Cross posthumously was Lillian Marie “Lillie” Murphy RN USNR (1887 -1918). Her citation reads, “For distinguished service and devotion to duty while serving at the Naval Base Hospital, Hampton Roads Virginia. During the epidemic of influenza, nurse Murphy worked day and night among the patients until stricken with the disease, as a result of which she lost her life. Nurse Murphy an immigrant from Toronto Canada, had moved to New York to study nursing at St. Mary Hospital, where she volunteered for the duty with the Naval Reserve.

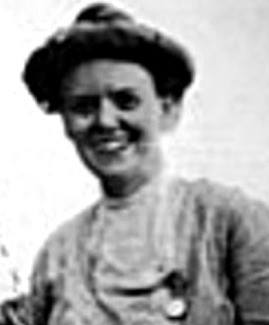
Lillian M. Murphy RN USNR was awarded the Navy Cross posthumously for her heroic work in the 1918 influenza pandemic.

The surviving fourth nurse was Lenah H. Sutcliffe Higbee, the second superintendent of the corps, and the first living woman to receive the medal. In 1945, the USS Higbee became the first fighting ship to be named after a woman in the service.

By the time of the armistice on 11 November 1918, over 1550 nurses had served in Naval hospitals and other facilities at home and abroad. Shortly after the fighting's end, several Navy nurses were assigned to duty aboard transports bringing troops home from Europe. Some Navy nurses even ventured on ground patrols and aided Army soldiers during this time.

== Interwar period ==
With the close of World War I, many turned away from all things war-related and by 1935 the Nurse Corps' numbers had been reduced to 332. However, this reduction did not stop the corps from making advances; new courses of study in the areas of diet therapy, neuropsychiatry, physiotherapy, and anesthesia were introduced and it was these educational advances which were key to the steady rise in the corps' professional status within the service. Though generally treated as officers socially and professionally, and wearing uniform stripes similar to those for the officer ranks of Ensign through Lieutenant Commander, formal recognition as Commissioned officers did not come until World War II.

It was also during this interwar period that paid retirement for longevity and disability was authorized as well as the extension of regular service to include Navy hospital ships. In addition to caring for Naval personnel at home and abroad, the corps responded to a number of civil disasters and assisted in the evacuation of dependents from war-torn China in 1937.

== World War II ==
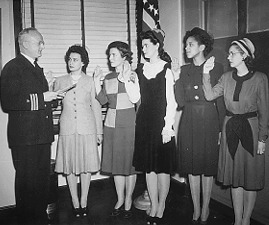
First African American Navy Nurse Corps Officer ENS Phyllis Mae Dailey in 1945

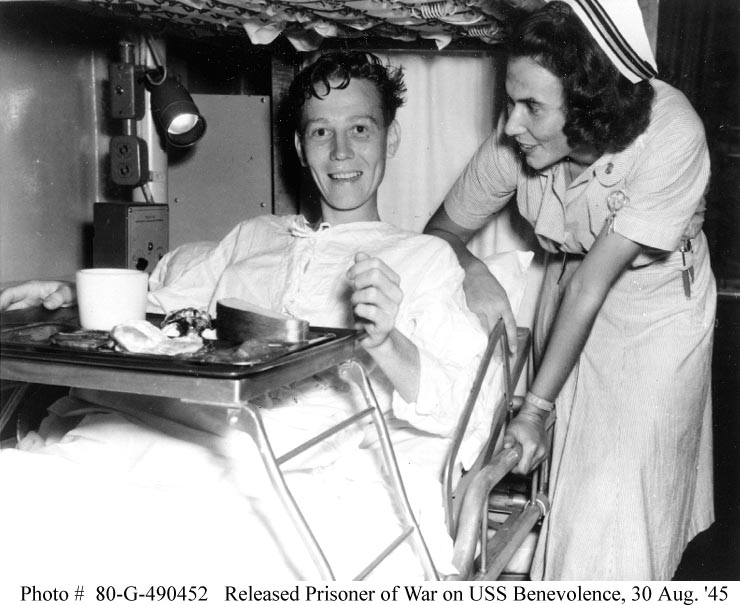
Nurse and released POW aboard USS Benevolence, World War II

Preparation for the conflict again saw the Nurse Corps grow, with nearly eight hundred members serving on active duty by November 1941, plus over nine hundred inactive reserves. By war's end there would be 1,799 active component nurses and 9,222 reserves (with the overwhelming number of reserves on active duty) scattered across six continents.

Though black nurses applied, until 1945, African-American nurses were rejected by the Navy. Phyllis Mae Dailey became the first black nurse accepted in the Navy Nurse Corps on March 8, 1945. Edith DeVoe, the only black navy nurse to be transferred at the end of the war to the regular service, took her oath on April 18, 1945, and Eula L. Stimley entered service on May 8, 1945. Along with Helen Fredericka Turner, these four nurses were the first African-American women to serve in the Navy during World War II.

Navy nurses were on duty during the initial Japanese attack on Pearl Harbor, Kāneʻohe Bay, the Philippines, Guam, and aboard the Solace; they were vital in preventing further loss of life and limb. In fact, the nursing profession's vital role was quickly recognized and it became the only women's profession that was deemed so essential as to be placed under the War Manpower Commission. Despite shortages of qualified nurses during the war, the navy was able to hold to its standards and enroll nurses of outstanding qualifications and experience. These outstanding nurses received advanced training in surgery, orthopedics, anesthesia, contagion, dietetics, physiotherapy, and psychiatry, the latter helping men understand and manage Post Traumatic Stress Syndrome (then known as shell-shock) and battlefield fatigue. But the navy nurses' duties not only included the tending to the injured and sick but also to the equally serious task of training Hospital Corpsmen. Many of these young men had never seen the inside of a hospital unless they themselves had been admitted, and as such it was training from the ground up. Once trained, the men were sent to work aboard fighting ships and on invasion beaches, where nurses were not yet officially assigned. Additionally, nurses trained WAVES for the Hospital Corps.

In the Pacific, Navy Nurses were the first American women to be sent to the islands north of New Caledonia, and the first group to Efate, in the New Hebrides. At Efate they cared for the wounded from the long Guadalcanal campaign, Army as well as Navy and Marine personnel. Others were stationed in New Caledonia, the Solomons, New Zealand, Australia, New Guinea, Coral Sea, Savo, Samoa, Tarawa, Attu, Adak, Dutch Harbor, Kwajalein, Guam, Saipan, Tinian, Leyte, Samar, Iwo Jima, and Okinawa. The purpose of these forward operating areas was stabilization. Only when patients were fully stabilized were they sent on to Pearl Harbor, and then eventually to the contiguous United States.

In Europe, navy nurses served in both England and Italy and in North and South America at Trinidad, Panama, Puerto Rico, Bermuda, Brazil, and Newfoundland. Navy nurses were even stationed in Africa.

In the contiguous United States, navy nurses were stationed at 263 locations, consisting of both large naval hospital complexes such as USN Hospital San Diego, California and Bethesda, Maryland as well as at a multitude of smaller naval convalescent hospitals and training station facilities. One of the more colorful convalescent hospitals was the USN Convalescent Hospital located at the Sun Valley Lodge in Idaho. After the lodge – built by the Union Pacific Railroad and its chairman W. Averell Harriman – opened in 1936, it quickly became a hotspot for the rich and famous. Notables included Ernest Hemingway who worked on For Whom the Bell Tolls in room No. 206, Clark Gable, Errol Flynn, Claudette Colbert, Bing Crosby and Gary Cooper. However, as supporting the war became a top priority and recreation secondary, the lodge was converted into a hospital, opening its doors in July 1943. In 1946 it reverted to its intended use. The story of the USN Convalescent Hospital is not unlike a host of other facilities which were converted, including the Averell Harriman estate in the Bear Mountains of the Catskills and the Ahwahnee Hotel at Yosemite National Park.

Aboard hospital ships, navy nurses followed the fleet in their assaults, and were eventually permitted to go to the beaches with the fighting men to pick up the wounded. Early in the war only the USS Solace and USS Relief brought comfort to the wounded fighting men via all-navy medical personnel. Later the Bountiful, Samaritan, Refuge, Haven, Benevolence, Tranquility, Consolation, Repose, Sanctuary, and Rescue were added.

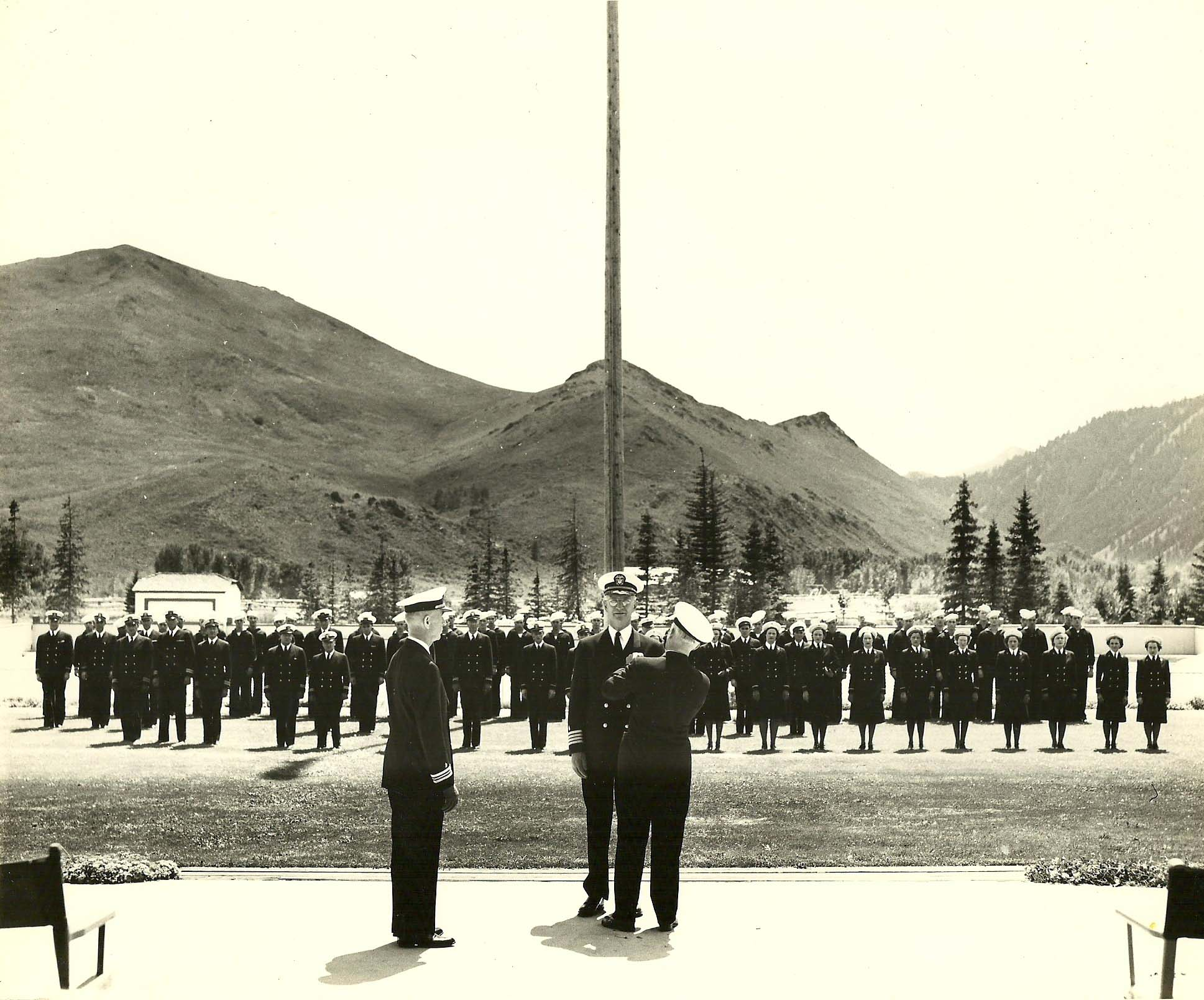
Purple Heart Award, Sun Valley Lodge 1943

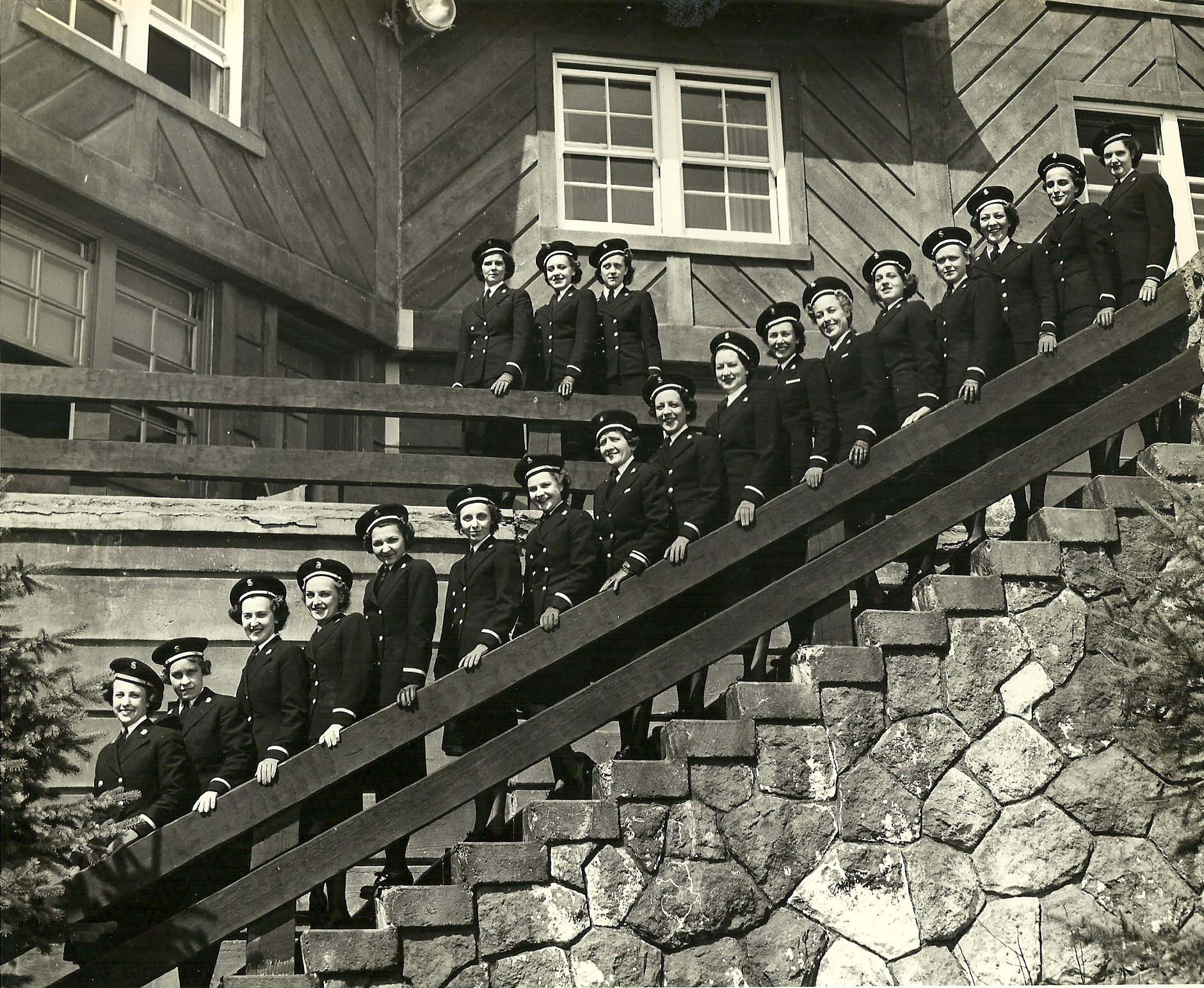
Navy Nurse Corps, Sun Valley Lodge 1944

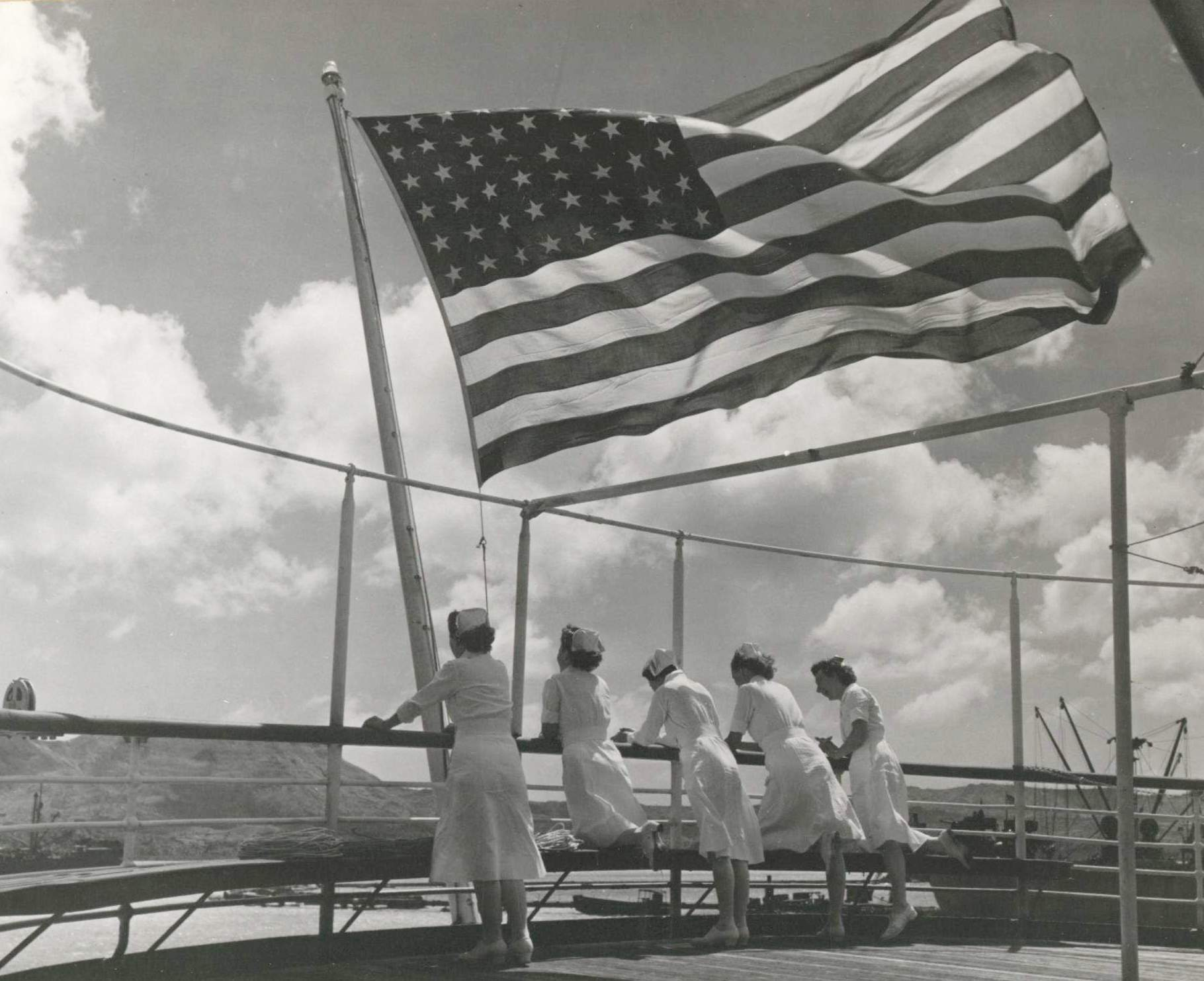
Navy Nurses Aboard USS Solace 1945

=== Prisoners of war ===
Two groups of Navy nurses were held prisoner by the Japanese in World War II. Chief Nurse Marion Olds and nurses Leona Jackson, Lorraine Christiansen, Virginia Fogerty and Doris Yetter were taken prisoner on Guam shortly after Pearl Harbor and transported to Japan. They were repatriated in August 1942, although the newspaper did not identify them as Navy nurses.

Chief Nurse Laura Cobb and her nurses, Mary Chapman, Bertha Evans, Helen Gorzelanski, Mary Harrington, Margaret Nash, Goldia O'Haver, Eldene Paige, Susie Pitcher, Dorothy Still and C. Edwina Todd (some of the "Angels of Bataan") were captured in 1942 and imprisoned in the Los Baños internment camp, where they continued to function as a nursing unit, until they were rescued by American forces in 1945. Other Los Baños prisoners later said: "We are absolutely certain that had it not been for these nurses many of us who are alive and well would have died." The nurses were awarded the Bronze Star Medal by the Army, a second award by the Navy and the Army's Distinguished Unit Badge.

Ann Agnes Bernatitus, one of the Angels of Bataan, nearly became a POW; she was one of the last to escape Corregidor Island, via the USS Spearfish. Upon her return to the United States she became the first American to receive the Legion of Merit.

=== Flight nurses ===
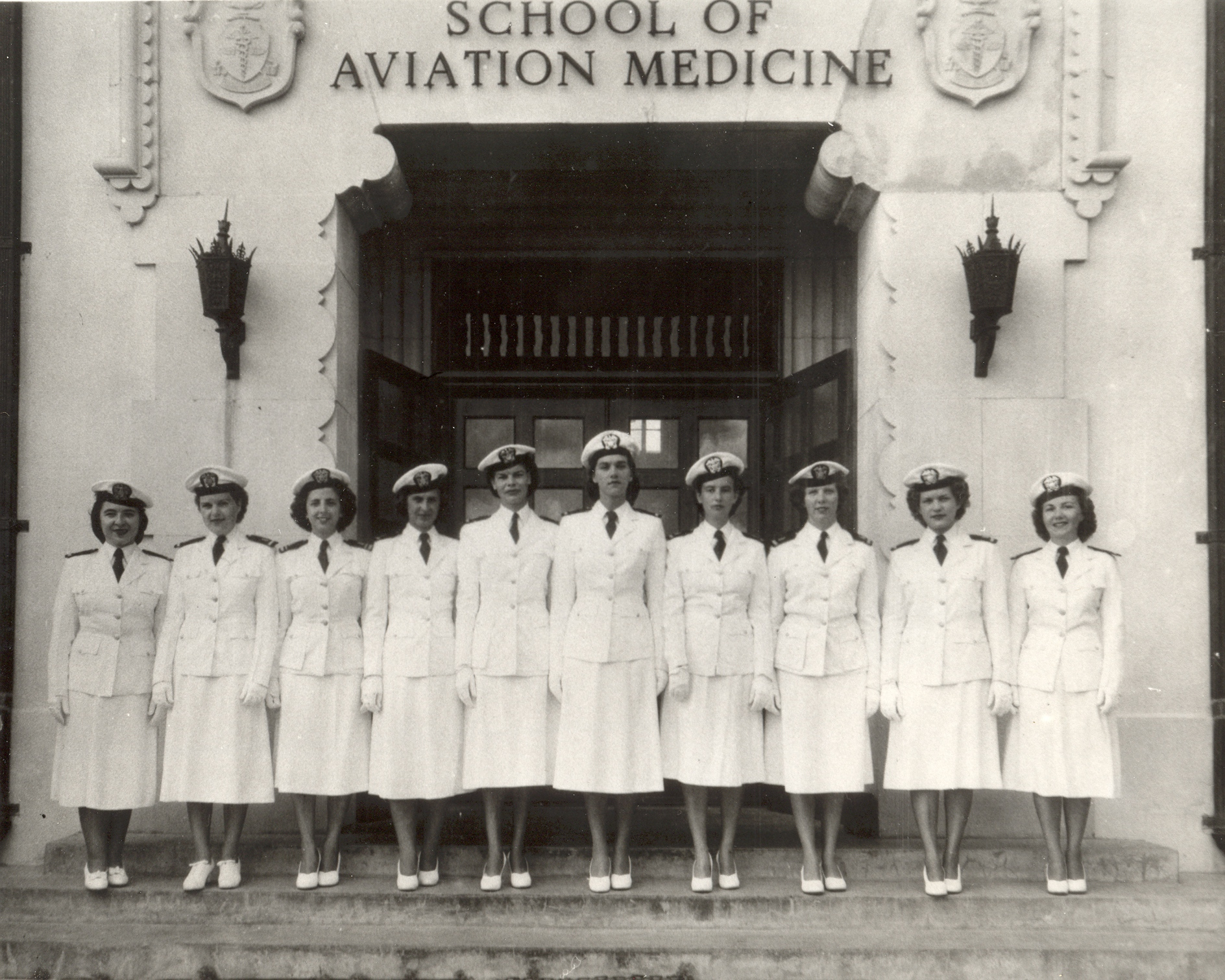
Navy Flight Nurse School, 1940s

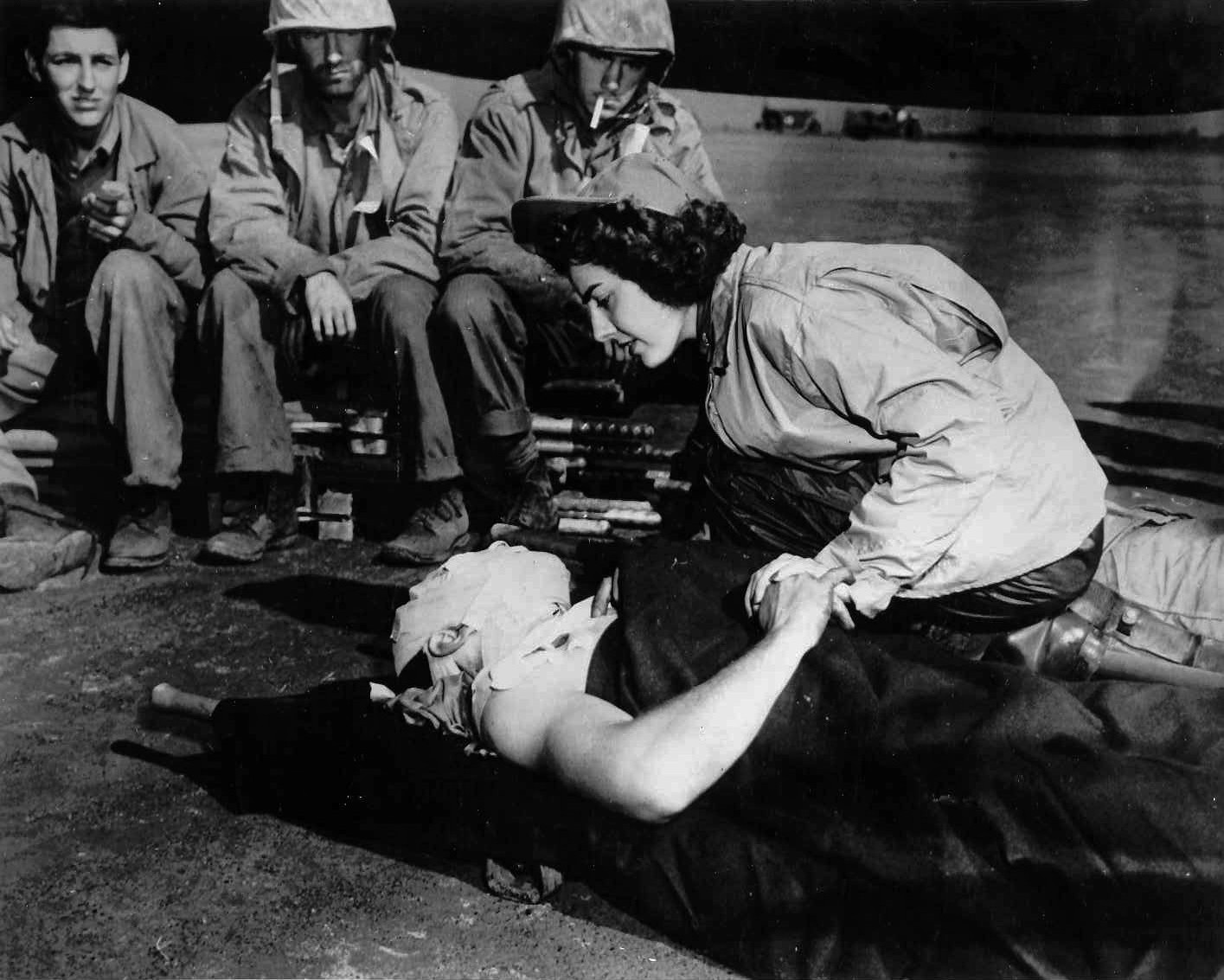
Navy flight nurse Jane Kendeigh and wounded Marine in Iwo Jima, 1945

The first group of 24 Naval flight nurses graduated from the Navy Flight Nurse School at the Naval Air Station Alameda, California on 22 January 1945. In addition to flight nurse procedures, they were trained to swim one mile, tow or push a victim for 220 yards, and swim 440 yards in 10 minutes. The newly minted flight nurses soon began active flying service on 24 flying teams, consisting of a nurse and a pharmacist's mate. Each 12-plane squadron operated with the following medical personnel: 24 flight nurses, 24 pharmacists' mates, one flight surgeon, and one Hospital Corps officer. After a certain number of transcontinental trips with wounded servicemen, the teams were sent to the Pacific to serve in the Naval Air Evacuation Service, the first arriving in Guam in early February 1945. There were three main flights of air evacuation planes to which flight nurses were assigned. First, from target areas to forward hospitals, such as Guam: second, from those forward hospitals to Pearl Harbor; and third, from Pearl Harbor to the contiguous United States. Nurses were rotated so that flight hours did not exceed 100 per month and they were also rotated between combat and noncombat flights.

An efficient procedure for aerial evacuation from target areas was quickly developed. The squadron flight surgeon and several pharmacists' mates were on the first hospital plane to land on the captured airfield. The surgeon established an evacuation clearing station adjacent to the airstrip, where with the help of his corpsmen, he collected patients from the first-aid and holding stations and screened them for air transport, giving necessary treatment prior to flight. As soon as the second hospital plane landed, the flight nurse aboard received her orders. The plane was loaded and usually departed in approximately 45 minutes, the flight nurse being responsible for all patients aboard. With the corpsman's aid, she dressed wounds, administered whole blood or plasma, gave medications, and fed the patients. Using this procedure, within 30 days, approximately 4,500 injured men were flown out of Okinawa alone.

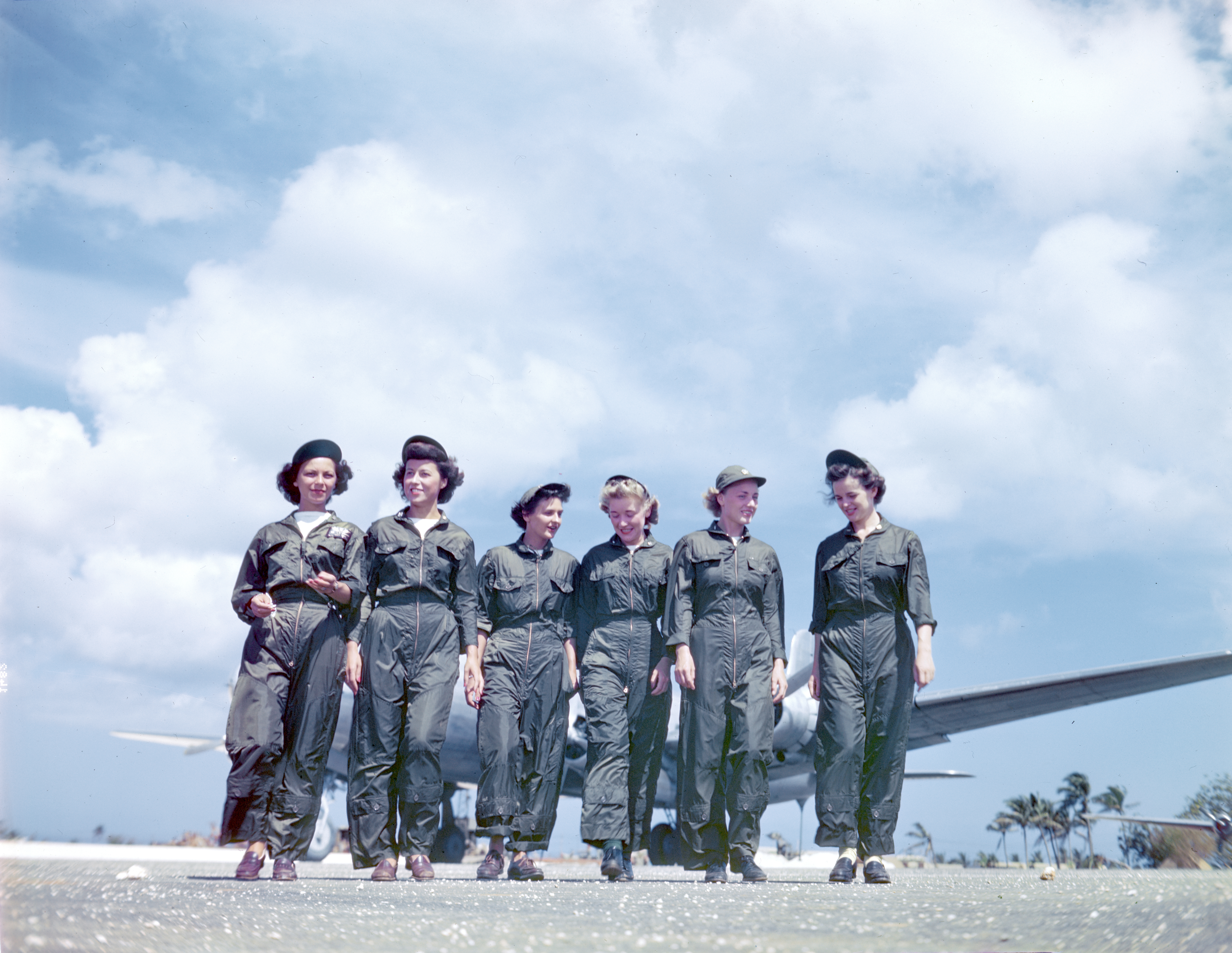
Navy flight nurses walk from their Douglas R5D (C-54)

In 1945 Jane Kendeigh became the first Navy flight nurse in an active combat zone, serving at Iwo Jima. Later that year she was also the first flight nurse to arrive in Okinawa.

== Korea ==
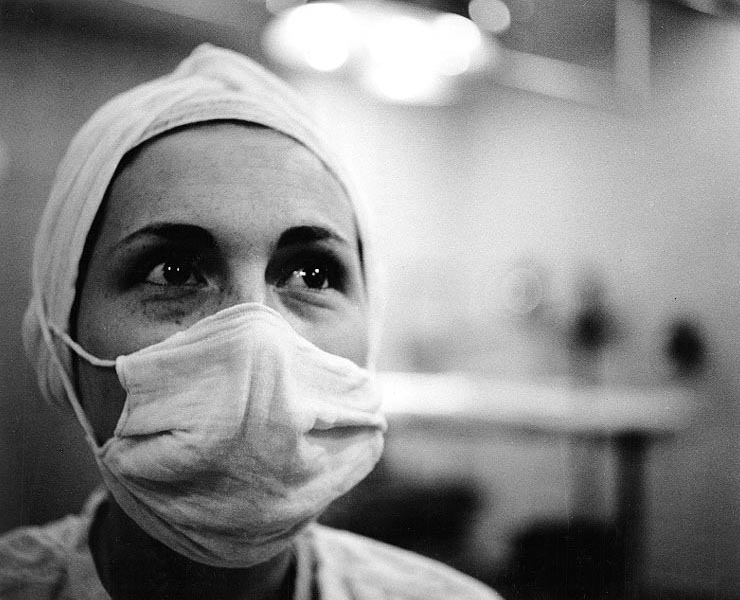
Nurse assists in surgery aboard USS Haven off of Korea, 1952

The need for naval medical facilities in Asia grew when the Korean War began. A small naval dispensary at Yokosuka, staffed by only six nurses, evolved into a full-fledged hospital staffed by 200 nurses. The Navy Nurse Corps expanded its ranks by recalling Reserve nurses with World War II experience. It temporarily reduced staffs at continental hospitals to staff the forward area. The Navy also commissioned civilian nurses. These nurses served in hospitals as well as aboard the USS Haven and two other Haven-class ships, where almost 35 percent of battle casualties were admitted through September 1952. These hospital ships were a new type of mobile hospital, moving from place to place, sometimes supporting the Inchon invasion or aiding the Hungnam evacuation, or simply shifting about the Korean coast as needed. Two senior Navy nurses, Commander Estelle Kalnoske Lange and Lieutenant Ruth Cohen, received the Bronze Star for their work on the Navy hospital ships.

Lt. Sarah Griffin Chapman, who had lost her lower left leg in an accident and retired prior to Korea, fought to be recalled to active duty so that she could teach other young amputees how to walk again. Though outside the Korean theater, one aviation accident claimed the lives of 11 Navy nurses. The mishap occurred on the South Pacific island of Kwajalein on 19 September 1950. These women were en route to hospitals in Japan to care for war casualties when their plane crashed into the Pacific shortly after takeoff.

== Vietnam ==
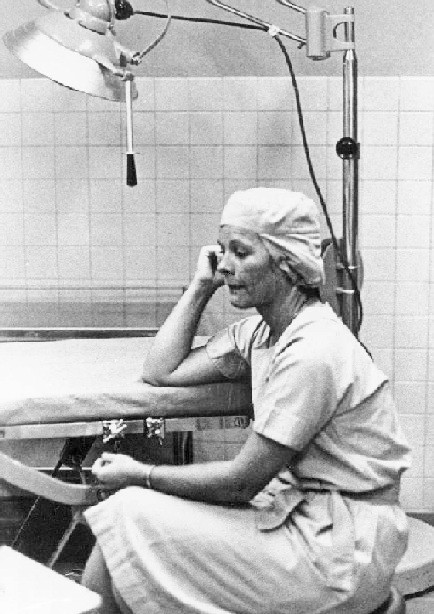
LT Alva Harrison after 18 hours of surgery. Saigon, 1966

In 1963, LT Bobbi Hovis volunteered to go to Vietnam, where she and four other nurses were tasked with converting a run-down Saigon apartment into the first US Navy Station Hospital—in four days.

In 1965 George M. Silver became the first man to be commissioned in the Navy Nurse Corps.

The first four Navy Nurse Corps officers to be injured in combat support were injured in Vietnam [Saigon] when LT Ruth Mason, LT Frances Crumpton, LT Barbara Wooster and LTJG Ann Darby Reynolds were wounded and later received the Purple Heart. Navy nurses went on to serve: in the Provincial Health Assistance Program at Rach Gia from 1965 to 1968; on the USS Repose from January 1966 to May 1970 (reaching a full complement of 29 nurses by March 1966 and serving as many as 200 helicopter admissions during a 24-hour period of intense fighting); on the USS Sanctuary from April 1967 to summer 1971 (also with a complement of 29 nurses); and at the station hospital at DaNang from August 1967 to May 1970 (which became the largest combat casualty treatment facility in the world, with 600 beds and admissions of 63,000 patients)., In and Out of Harm's Way, by CAPT Doris Sterner, USN p. 358.

== Currently ==
Operation Iraqi Freedom (OIF) 2006 in Al-Taqaddum Air Base (also known as Tammuz Airbase), Iraq, Active Duty Commander Lenora C. Langlais was the first African American female and first African American Nurse in the history of the U.S.Navy to receive the Purple Heart after being injured by a mortar bomb while serving as the Fleet Marine Force (FMF) Senior Combat Nurse with the 1st Marine Logistic Group (1st MLG) Surgical Shock Trauma Platoon (SSTP) combat hospital from Camp Pendleton United States Marine Corps. Navy Nurses (2900) are deployed all over the world; participating in humanitarian and combat support missions with Expeditionary Resuscitative Surgical Service (ERSS) teams aboard amphibious assault and amphibious warfare ships; Fleet Surgical Teams aboard amphibious assault and amphibious warfare ships in addition to boots on ground; as flight nurses; as organic crew aboard hospital ships and aircraft carriers; boots on ground with the Marine Corps; individually augmented with the Army; and select sub-specialties in support of special operations including (but not limited to) Surgical Response Teams (SRTs).

== Modern Nurse Corps ==
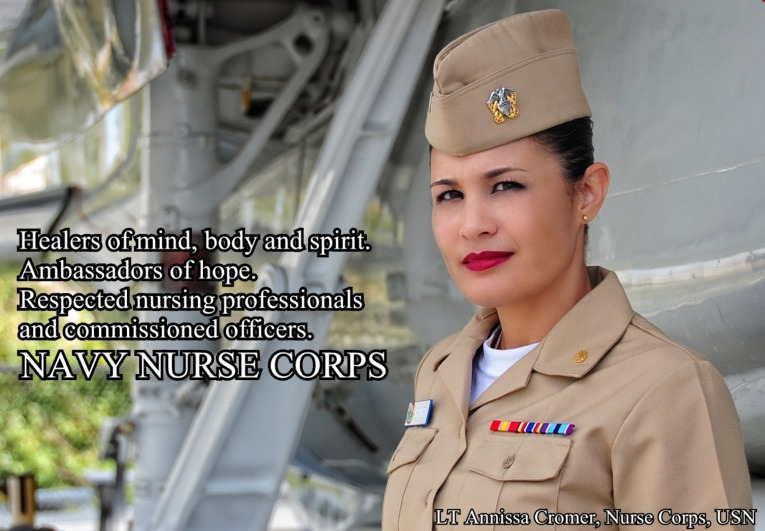
LT Annissa Cromer, Nurse Corps, USN, 2010.

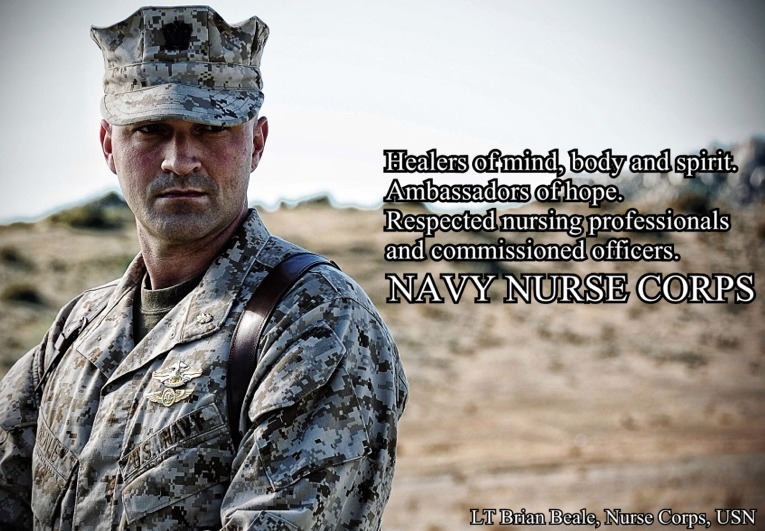
LT Brian Beale, Nurse Corps, 2011.

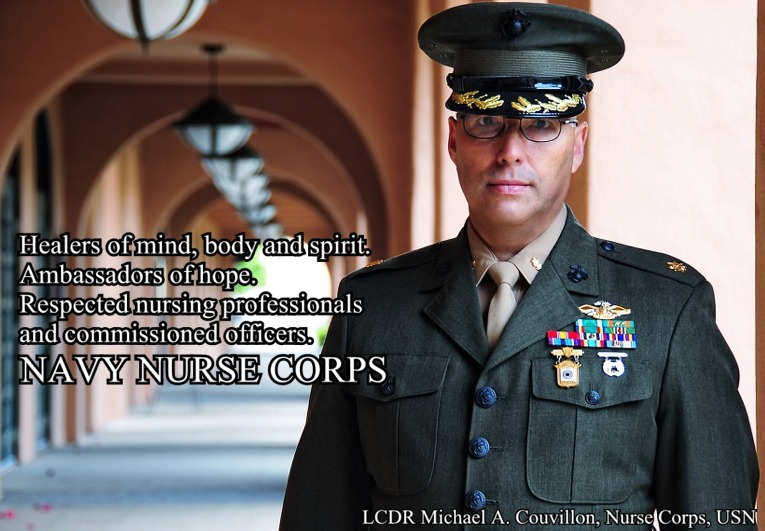
LCDR Michael A. Couvillon, Nurse Corps, 2011.

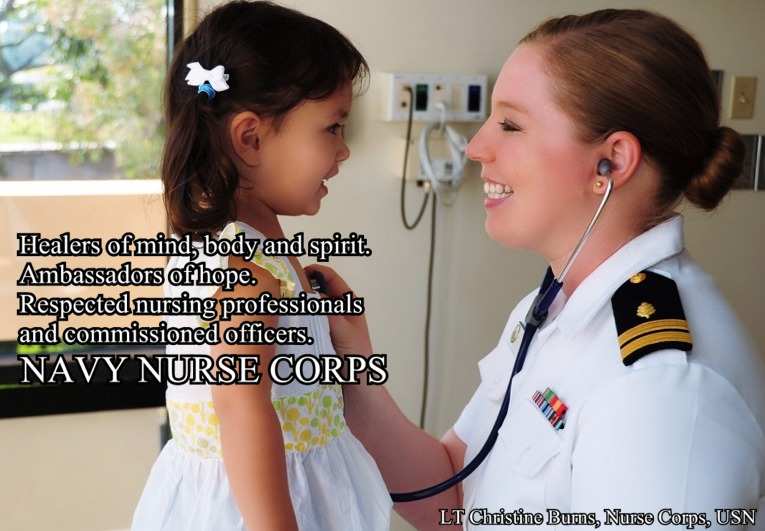
LT Christine Burns, Nurse Corps 2011.

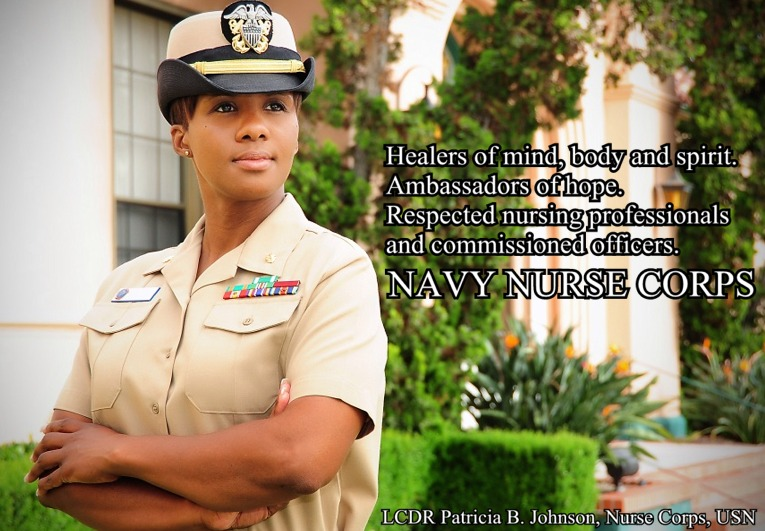
LCDR Patricia B. Johnson, Nurse Corps, 2012.

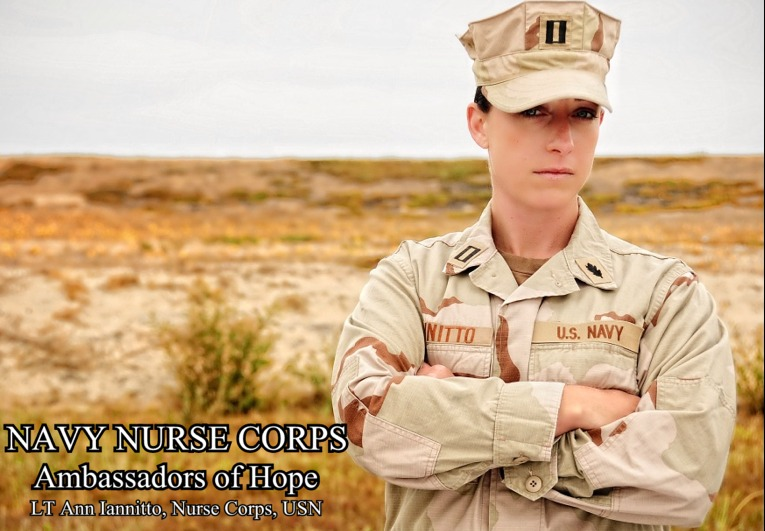
LT Ann Iannitto, Nurse Corps, 2012.

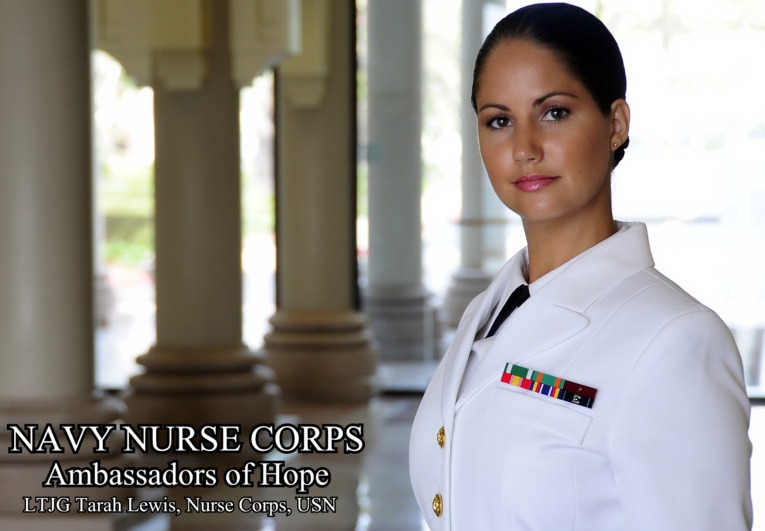
LTJG Tarah Lewis, Nurse Corps, 2013.

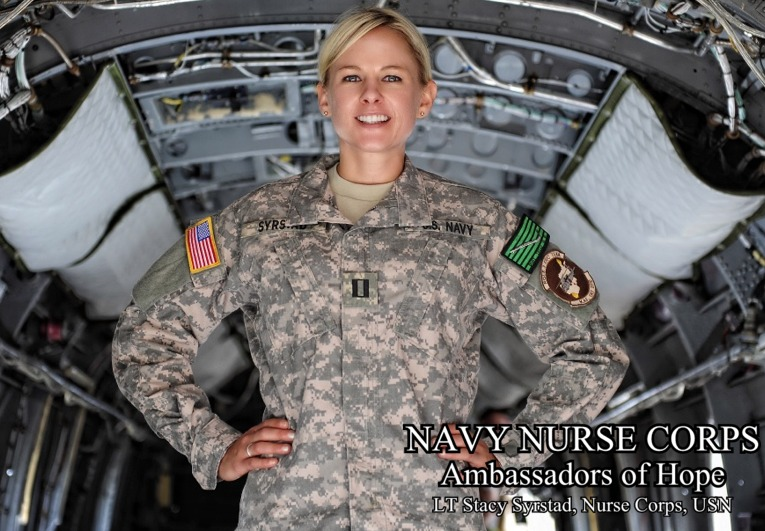
LT Stacy Syrstad, Nurse Corps, 2013.

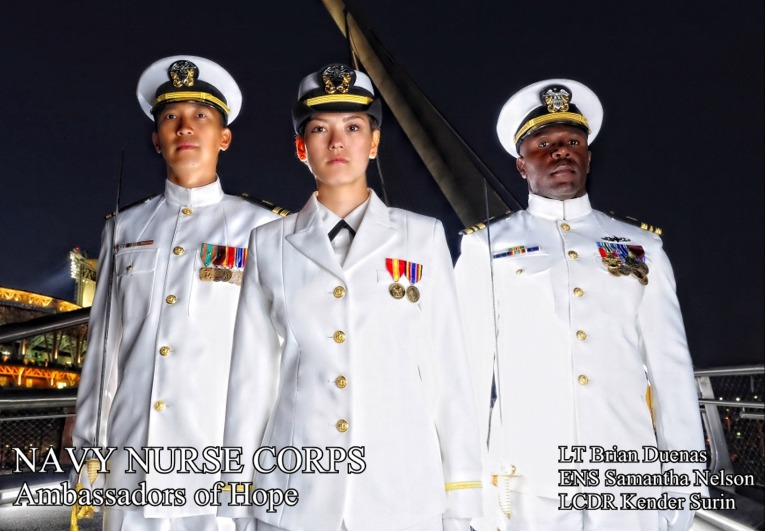
LT Brian Duenas, ENS Samantha Nelson, LCDR Kender Surin, Nurse Corps, 2013.

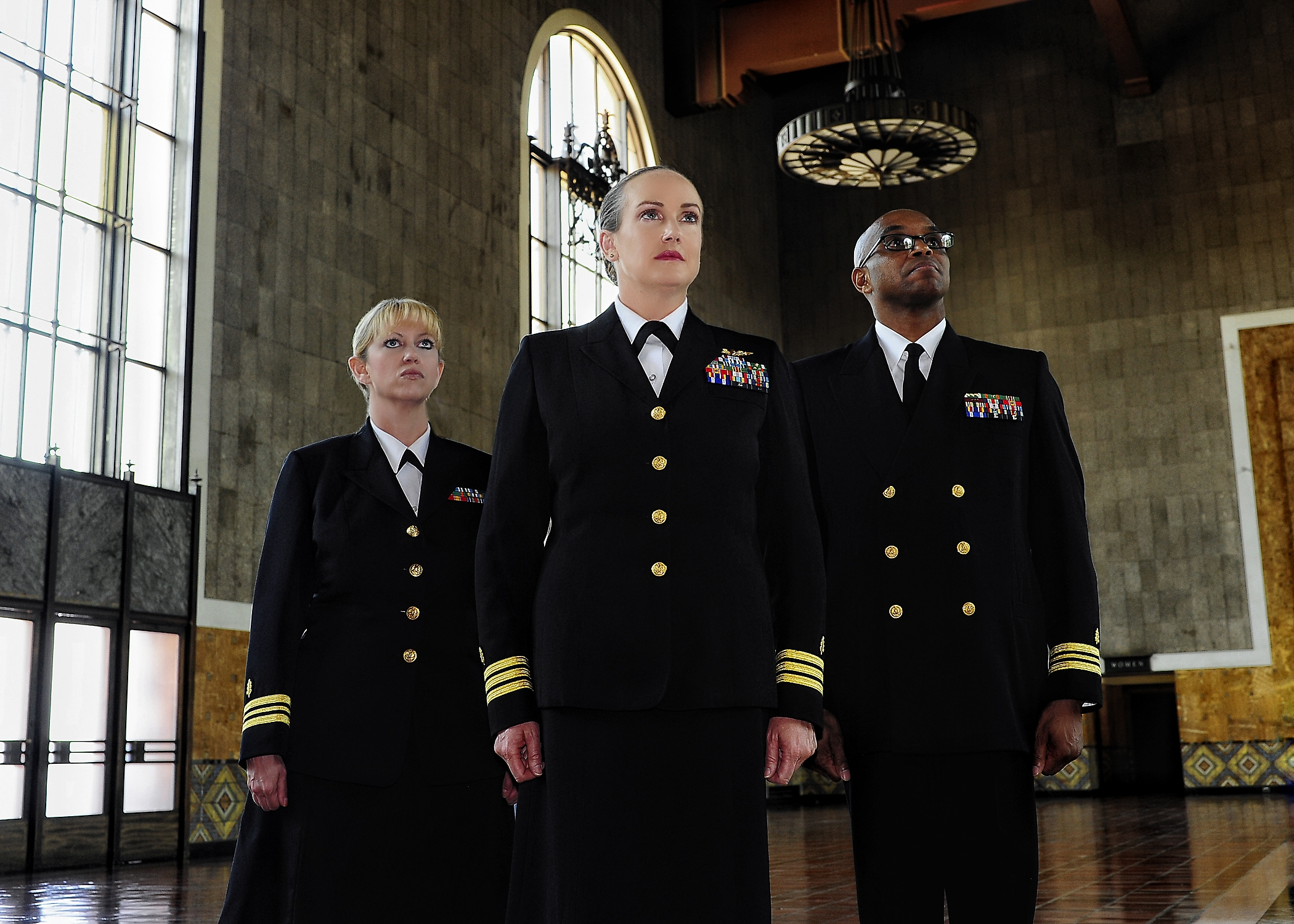
NTTC at LAC+USC provides Level-1 trauma training. Instructors are hand selected from Hospital, Medical and Nurse Corps.

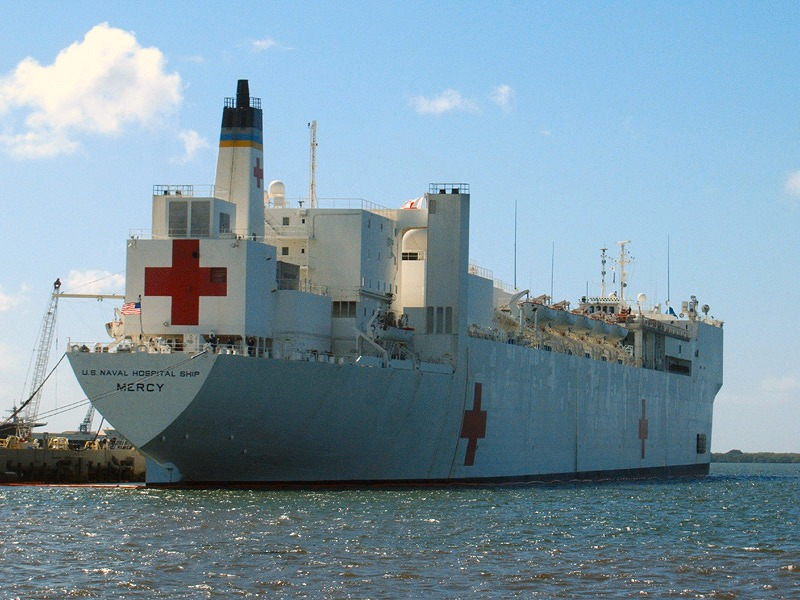
USNS Mercy, a USN hospital ship.

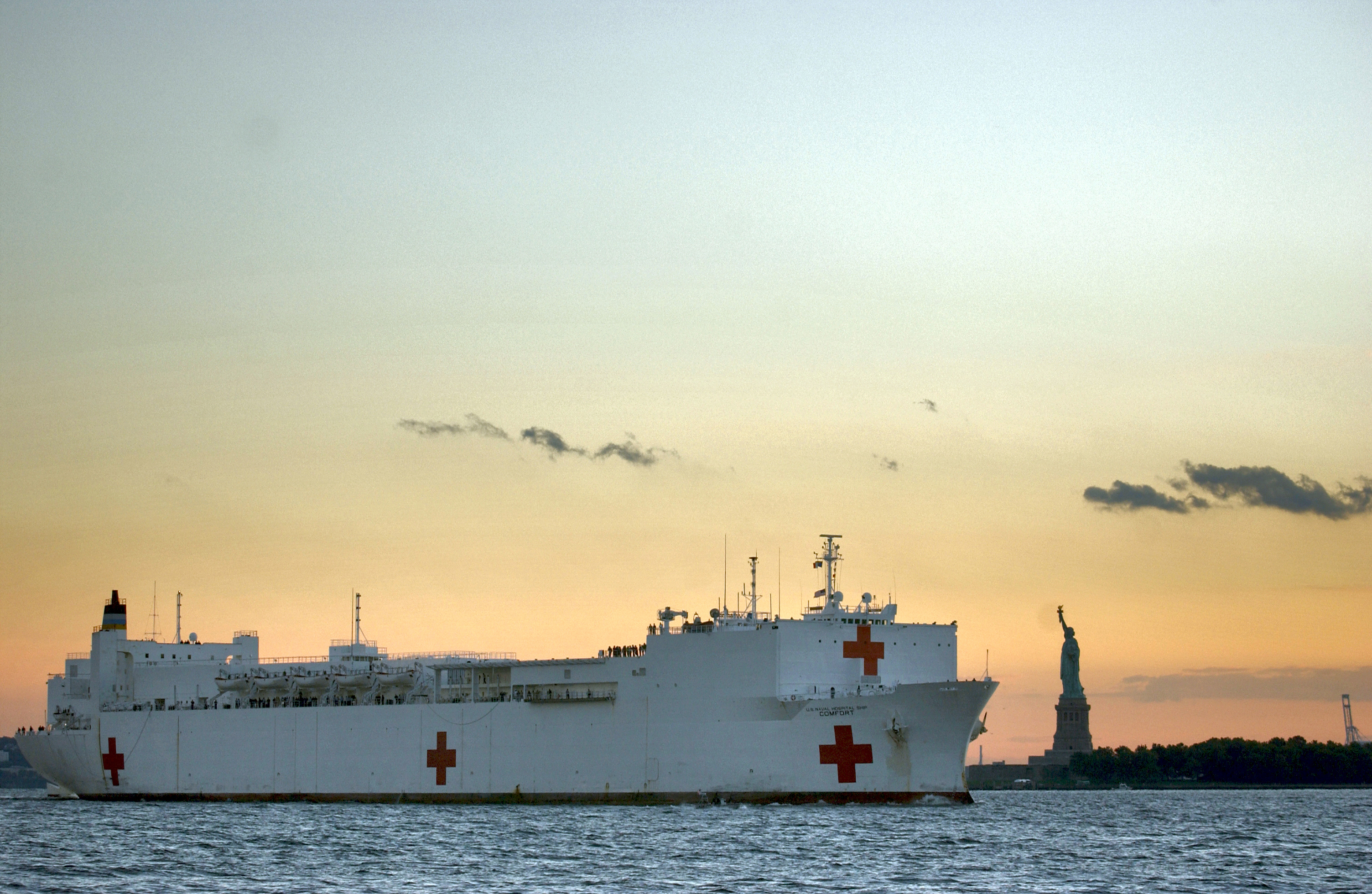
USNS Comfort, a USN hospital ship.

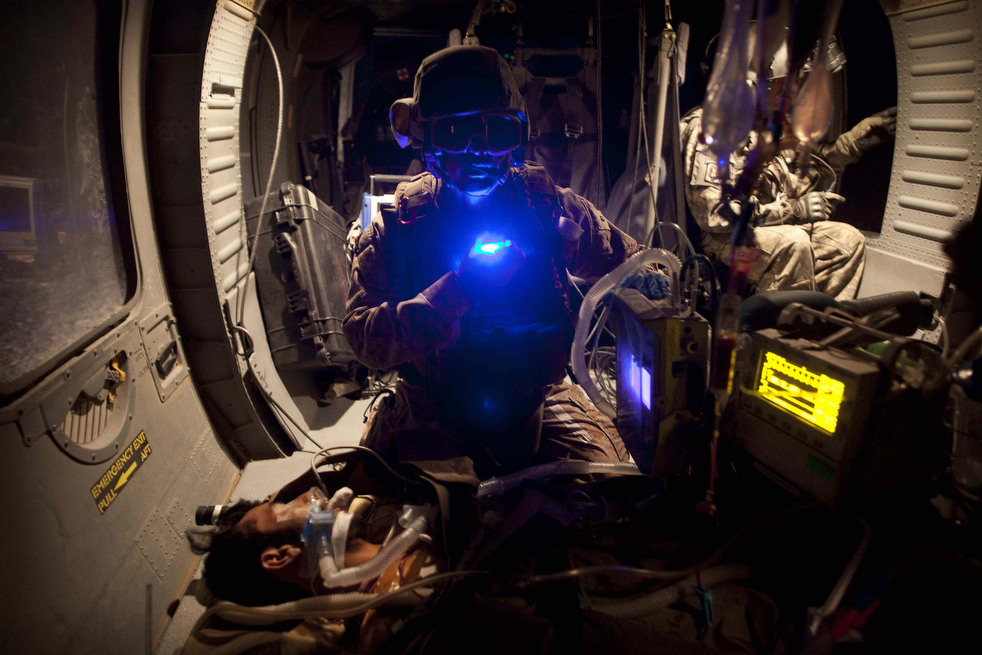
Navy Nurse Corps, Individually Augmented Navy Nurses serve with ground forces.

The Nurse Corps continues as a prominent part of the Navy Medicine establishment. It consists of officers of the rank of Ensign and to Rear Admiral (upper half). Navy Nurse Corps officers are commissioned through ROTC, STA-21, Medical Enlisted Commissioning Program (MECP), Nurse Candidate Program, and by direct commission.

== Insignia, badges and aiguillettes ==
The Nurse Corps has a distinctive insignia of a single Oak Leaf, on one collar point, or in place of a line officer's star on shoulder boards.

Navy Nurse Corps officers (2900s) are eligible to earn and wear the Fleet Marine Force, Surface, Basic Parachutist Badge, Navy and Marine Corps Parachutist insignia, Air Crew and Flight Nurse warfare badges. Select Navy Nurse Corps officers are eligible to wear special-warfare insignia. Officers selected to formally serve as executive assistants to flag officers or congressional leaders may be eligible to wear an aiguillette and/or unique insignia. Navy Nurse Corps officers can also earn the Army Combat Badge but are not currently authorized to wear it. Executive-grade Navy Nurse Corps officers who have, or had, command of an installation or commissioned unit ashore are eligible to wear the Navy Command Ashore insignia. Navy Nurse Corps officers who have had command of a hospital ship are authorized to wear the Navy Command at Sea insignia.

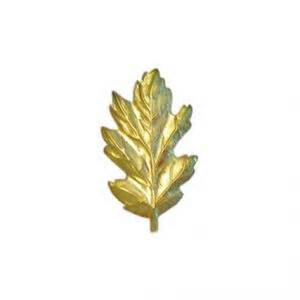
Navy Nurse Corps insignia

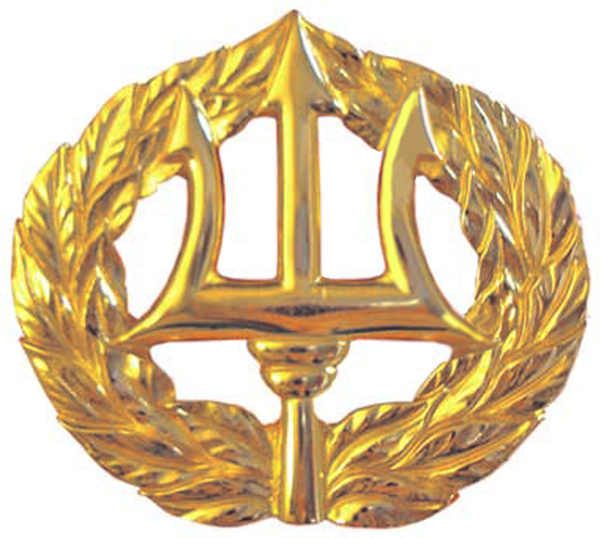
Navy Command Ashore insignia

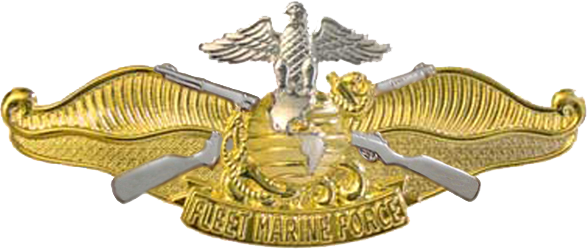
Fleet Marine Force [FMF] officer insignia

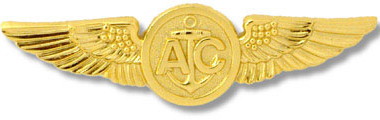
Navy, Marine Corps and Coast Guard Aircrew Badge

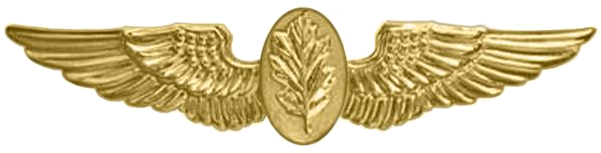
Navy Flight Nurse insignia

Basic Parachutist Badge

Navy and Marine Corps Parachutist insignia

== Superintendents and directors ==
From its founding in 1908 until after World War II in 1947, the Navy Nurse Corps was led by a superintendent. Its nurses had no permanent commissioned rank during that time. The Army-Navy Nurses Act took effect on 16 April 1947, establishing the Navy Nurse Corps as a staff corps, with officers holding permanent commissioned rank from Ensign to Commander. The corps was to be led by a director holding the rank of Captain while in that position. This position later evolved into a flag-rank appointment and there can be up to four Navy Nurse Corps flag-rank officers serving concurrently, as of 2012.

=== List of superintendents of the Navy Nurse Corps ===
•	Esther Voorhees Hasson	( August 1908	– January 1911)
•	Lenah Sutcliffe Higbee	( January 1911	– November 1922)
•	LCDR Josephine Beatrice Bowman	( November 1922	– January 1935)
•	LCDR Myn M. Hoffman	( January 1935	– October 1938)
•	Virginia Rau (acting)	( October 1938	– February 1939)
•	CAPT Sue S. Dauser	( February 1939	– November 1945)
•	CAPT Nellie Jane DeWitt	( November 1945	– April 1947)

=== List of directors of the Navy Nurse Corps ===
•	CAPT Nellie Jane DeWitt	( April 1947	– May 1950)
•	CAPT Winnie Gibson	( May 1950	– May 1954)
•	CAPT Wilma Leona Jackson	( May 1954	– May 1958)
•	CAPT Ruth Agatha Houghton	( May 1958	– April 1962)
•	CAPT Ruth Alice Erickson	( April 1962	– April 1966)
•	CAPT Veronica Bulshefski	( April 1966	– May 1970)
•	Rear Admiral (upper half) Alene B. Duerk	( May 1970	– July 1975)
•	Rear Admiral Maxine Conder	( July 1975	– July 1979)
•	Rear Admiral Frances Shea-Buckley	( July 1979	– October 1983)
•	Rear Admiral Mary Joan Nielubowicz	( October 1983	– September 1987)
•	Rear Admiral Mary Fields Hall	( September 1987	– September 1991)
•	Rear Admiral Mariann Stratton	( September 1991	– September 1994)
•	Rear Admiral Joan Marie Engel	( September 1994	– 1998)
•	Rear Admiral (upper half) Kathleen L. Martin	( 1998	– 2001)
•	Rear Admiral (upper half) (acting Director) RADM Karen A. Harmeyer	( 2000	– 2001)
•	Rear Admiral (upper half) Nancy J. Lescavage	( 2001	– 2005)
•	Rear Admiral (upper half) Christine Bruzek-Kohler	(2005	– 2009)
•	Rear Admiral (upper half) Karen Flaherty	(2009	– 2010)
•	Rear Admiral (upper half) Elizabeth S. Niemyer	(2010	– 2013)
•	Rear Admiral (upper half) Rebecca J. McCormick-Boyle	(2013	– 2017)
•	Rear Admiral Tina A. Davidson	( 2017	– 2020)
•	Rear Admiral Cynthia A. Kuehner	(2020	– 2023)
•	Rear Admiral Robert J. Hawkins	(2023	– current)

== Prominent members ==
Year	Member(s)	Notes	Image
1908	Chief Nurse Esther Voorhees Hasson	First Superintendent of the Navy Nurse Corps.	Esther Voorhees Hasson
1918	Edna E. Place, Mary Louise Hidell and Lilian M. Murphy	Navy Cross awarded to Navy Nurses who gallantly sacrificed their lives caring for patients during the Influenza Pandemic.	Mary Louise Hidell
1918	Chief Nurse Lenah H. Sutcliffe Higbee	Second Superintendent of the Navy Nurse Corps, first living female recipient of the Navy Cross.	Lenah H. Sutcliffe Higbee
1941	Chief Nurse Marion Olds, Leona Jackson, Lorraine Christiansen, Virginia Fogerty, and Doris Yetter	First Navy Nurse Corps officers taken as POWs, captured in Guam, kept prisoner in Japan. – World War II.	Navy Nurse Corps POWs Chief Nurse Marion Olds, Leona Jackson and Lorraine Christiansen after their release
1942	Chief Nurse Laura Cobb, Mary Chapman, Bertha Evans, Helen Gorzelanski, Mary Harrington, Margaret Nash, Goldie O'Haver, Eldene Paige, Susie Pitcher, Dorothy Still Danner, and C. Edwina Todd	Navy Nurse Corps officers taken as POWs, Captured and kept prisoner by the Japanese in the Philippines.	Chief Nurse Laura Cobb and Dorothy Still Danner among other Navy Nurse POWs after their release
1942	CDR Ann Agnes Bernatitus	First American recipient of the Legion of Merit and member of the "Angels of Bataan" – World War II.	CDR Ann Agnes Bernatitus, Nurse Corps, USN
1944	CAPT Sue S. Dauser	First woman in the Navy to be promoted to the rank of Captain O-6 – World War II.	CAPT Sue S. Dauser, Nurse Corps, USN
1945	ENS Jane Kendeigh	First Navy flight nurse in an active combat zone, serving at Iwo Jima. Later that year first flight nurse to arrive in Okinawa. With Air Evacuation Transport Squadron One (VRE-1).	ENS Jane Kendeigh, Nurse Corps, USN
1945	Chief Nurse Lenah Higbee	First warship named after a Navy Nurse Corps officer, USS Higbee (DD-806). Awarded 8 battle stars during World War II and Korea. Nicknamed "Leaping Lenah".	USS Higbee (DD-806)
1945	ENS Phyllis Mae Dailey	First formally appointed African American Navy Nurse.	Phyllis Mae Dailey being sworn in as the first formally appointed African American Navy Nurse Corps officer
1950	ENS Constance Esposito, LTJG Alice J. Giroux, ENS Marie M. Boatman, LTJG Constance A. Heege, LTJG Jeanmne E. Clarke, LTJG Margaret G. Kennedy, LTJG Calla V. Goodwin, ENS Edna J. Rundell, ENS Eleanor C. Beste, LTJG Mary E. Liljegreen and ENS Jane L. Eldridge	Eleven Navy Nurse Corps officers en route to Japan to care for war casualties killed near the South Pacific island of Kwajalein when their plane crashed into the Pacific after takeoff.	
1951	LT Sarah Griffin Chapman	Navy Nurse Corps officer who had lost her lower left leg in an accident and retired prior to the Korean War, successfully fought to be recalled to active duty so that she could care for troops returning from combat.	LT Sarah Griffin Chapman, Nurse Corps, USN
1952	CDR Estelle K. Lange and LT Ruth Cohen	Awarded the Bronze Star caring for casualties during shipboard combat support service.	Navy Nurse caring for the wounded aboard USS Haven during Korean War
1964	LT Ruth Mason, LT Frances Crumpton, LT Barbara Wooster and LTJG Ann Darby Reynolds	First Navy Nurse Corps officers to receive the Purple Heart Medal – Vietnam.	The first Navy Nurse Corps officers to receive the Purple Heart Medal, Vietnam
1972	Rear Admiral Alene B. Duerk	First woman in the Navy to be promoted to flag rank.	RADM Alene B. Duerk, Nurse Corps, USN
1978	CAPT Joan C. Bynum	First African American female Naval officer promoted to the rank of captain.	CAPT Joan C. Bynum, Nurse Corps, USN
1983	CAPT Mary F. Hall	First Navy Nurse Corps officer to serve as a commanding officer at a hospital command, U.S. Naval Hospital Guantanamo Bay.	
1991	LT Barney R. Barendse	First Navy Nurse Corps officer to command a surgical company during combat operations – Operation Desert Storm. Awarded Bronze Star Medal.	
1993	CAPT Nancy J. Lescavage	First Navy Nurse Corps officer to serve as a Congressional Fellow in the office of a United States Senator.	Senator Daniel Inouye, CAPT Nancy J. Lescavage and RDML Kathleen L. Martin
1996	LT Joseph Cosentino Jr.	First Navy Nurse Corps officer to become jump qualified and earn insignia.	LT Joseph Cosentino Jr. becomes first Navy Nurse Corps officer to become jump qualified and earn insignia
1997	RADM Karen A. Harmeyer	First female Naval officer, Reserve Component promoted to the rank of rear admiral (upper half).	RADM Karen A. Harmeyer, Nurse Corps, USN
1999	RADM Kathleen L. Martin	First Navy Nurse Corps officer to serve as a commanding officer at a "Big 3" Naval Medical Center National Naval Medical Center, today known as Walter Reed National Military Medical Center.	RADM Kathleen L. Martin becomes the first Navy Nurse Corps commanding officer of a Big 3 military treatment facility command
2000	RADM Karen A. Harmeyer	First Reserve Component Navy Nurse Corps officer to serve as acting director of the Navy Nurse Corps.	RADM Karen A. Harmeyer, Nurse Corps, USN
2002	CAPT Albert Shimkus	First Navy Nurse Corps officer to be a Joint Task Force surgeon, at Guantanamo Bay.	CAPT Albert Shimkus, Nurse Corps, USN
2002	RADM Karthleen L. Martin	First Navy Nurse Corps officer assigned as Deputy Surgeon General of the Navy.	RADM Kathleen L. Martin becomes the first Navy Nurse Corps Deputy Surgeon General of the Navy in 2002
2002	LT Patricia C. Hasen	First Navy Nurse Corps officer to be formally appointed as a flag lieutenant (e.g., aide) to a flag rank unrestricted line officer.	LT Patricia C. Hasen NC USN is the first First Navy Nurse Corps officer to be formally appointed as an executive assistant to a flag rank unrestricted line officer
2003	CDR Joseph Cosentino Jr.	First Navy Nurse Corps officer to serve as officer in charge, (OIC) and dean at the John F. Kennedy Special Warfare Center and School.	
2004	CAPT Albert Shimkus	First Navy Nurse Corps officer to be the deputy commandant, Naval District Washington.	CAPT Albert Shimkus, Nurse Corps, USN
2005	CDR Joseph Cosentino Jr.	First Navy Nurse Corps officer to serve as an Amphibious Task Force Surgeon. Aboard USS Iwo Jima for multi-national communication exercise involving 25 ships and 5,000 embarked Marines.	
2006	CAPT Albert Shimkus	First Navy Nurse Corps officer to command a hospital ship USNS Comfort (T-AH-20).	CAPT Albert Shimkus, Nurse Corps, USN
2006	CDR Lenora C. Langlais	First African American Nurse Corps officer to receive a Purple Heart Medal and the first in support of Operation Iraqi Freedom.	CDR Lenora C. Langlais, Nurse Corps, USN
2007	CDR Maureen Pennington	Awarded the Bronze Star for her service leading a surgical company during combat operations Operation Iraqi Freedom.	CDR Maureen Pennington, Nurse Corps, USN
2009	RADM Karen Flaherty	First Reserve Component Navy Nurse Corps officer formally appointed to serve as director of the Navy Nurse Corps.	RADM Karen Flaherty, Nurse Corps, USN
2009	CDR Kim Lebel	First Navy Nurse Corps officer to receive a Purple Heart Medal in support of Operation Enduring Freedom.	CDR Kim LeBel, Nurse Corps, USN and the Chief of Naval Operations
2010	CAPT Joseph Cosentino Jr.	First Navy Nurse Corps officer to serve as a Fleet Surgeon for a Marine Expeditionary Force, Force Surgeon, II Marine Expeditionary Force.	General John M. Paxton Jr. and CAPT Joseph Cosentino Jr., Nurse Corps, USN
2012	CAPT Cynthia Feller	First Navy Nurse Corps officer to serve as a fleet surgeon for a Naval Force, Europe, 6th Fleet.	CAPT Cynthia Feller, Nurse Corps, USN
2013	CAPT Jacqueline D. Rychnovsky	First Navy Nurse Corps officer to command a Naval Research and Development Center, NHRC, San Diego, CA. She went on to command the Navy Medicine Research and Development enterprise as Commanding Officer of NMRC, Silver Spring, MD.	

== Ships named after Navy Nurse Corps officers ==
The Navy has so far named two warships in honor of Navy Nurse Corps officers, both for Supt. Lenah Higbee;

- USS Higbee (DD-806), a Gearing-class destroyer commissioned in 1945.. This was the first U.S. Navy warship to bear the name of one of its female members.
- USS Lenah H. Sutcliffe Higbee (DDG-123), a planned Arleigh Burke-class guided missile destroyer scheduled to enter the fleet in 2024.

== Ships named after nurses ==
- USS Florence Nightingale (AP-70)
- USS Dorothea L. Dix (AP-67)

== See also ==
- United States Army Nurse Corps
- United States Air Force Nurse Corps
- History of nursing in the United States
- Women in the United States Navy
- Angels of Bataan
