= Nellie Jane DeWitt =

American nursing administrator

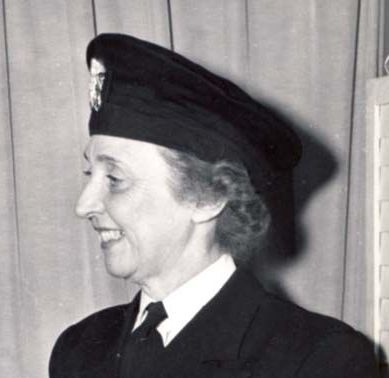
- CAPT Nellie Jane DeWitt, USN
- Born: July 16, 1895; Susquehanna, Pennsylvania, U.S.
- Died: March 22, 1978 (aged 82); McLean, Virginia, U.S.
- Military career
- Allegiance: United States of America
- Branch: Navy Nurse Corps
- Service years: 1918 - 1950;
- Rank: Captain
- Commands: Superintendent/Director of the United States Navy Nurse Corps 1946–1950
- Conflicts: World War II

Captain Nellie Jane DeWitt (July 16, 1895 – March 22, 1978) was the sixth and final Superintendent of the Navy Nurse Corps and became its first director.

== Early life ==
Nellie Jane DeWitt was born in Susquehanna, Pennsylvania to Peter and Ella C DeWitt and grew up on her family's farm in Jackson, Pennsylvania. She attended Susquehanna High School. She graduated from Stamford Hospital School of Nursing in Stamford, Connecticut in 1917.

== Navy Nurse Corps career ==
CAPT DeWitt joined the Navy Nurse Corps on October 26, 1918. Her first post was Naval Hospital, Charleston, South Carolina. She joined the Regular ranks in 1922. Duty stations included Newport, Rhode Island; Portsmouth, Virginia; Puget Sound; Washington, DC; San Diego, CA; Guantanamo Bay, Cuba. She was promoted to Chief Nurse in April 1937 and served as Chief Nurse at the Naval hospital, Aiea Heights in Hawaii.

== Contributions as Superintendent ==
CAPT DeWitt took over as Superintendent in April 1946 at a time when the Nurse Corps was shrinking in size due to demobilization after World War II. On April 16, 1947, the Navy Nurse Corps became a staff corps, meaning that officers in the Nurse Corps were Navy officers. CAPT DeWitt became the Director of the Navy Nurse Corps. She retired on May 1, 1950 and returned to Pennsylvania.

== Later life ==
DeWitt led an active retirement life in Pennsylvania. She consulted for the Girl Scouts on health matters, was president of the Susquehanna County Unit of the American Cancer Society, and was a Distinguished Daughter of Pennsylvania. The Business and Professional Women's Club in Susquehanna took her name for their chapter. At the time of her death, she had returned to the DC area and was living at Vinson Hall, the Navy and Marine Corps Retirement Center, in McLean, Virginia. She died there on 22 March 1978 at the age of 82 and was buried in the Nurse's section of Arlington National Cemetery.

Preceded by Sue S. Dauser	Superintendent and Director, Navy Nurse Corps; 1945–1947, 1947–1950	Succeeded by Winnie Gibson
