= Winnie Gibson =

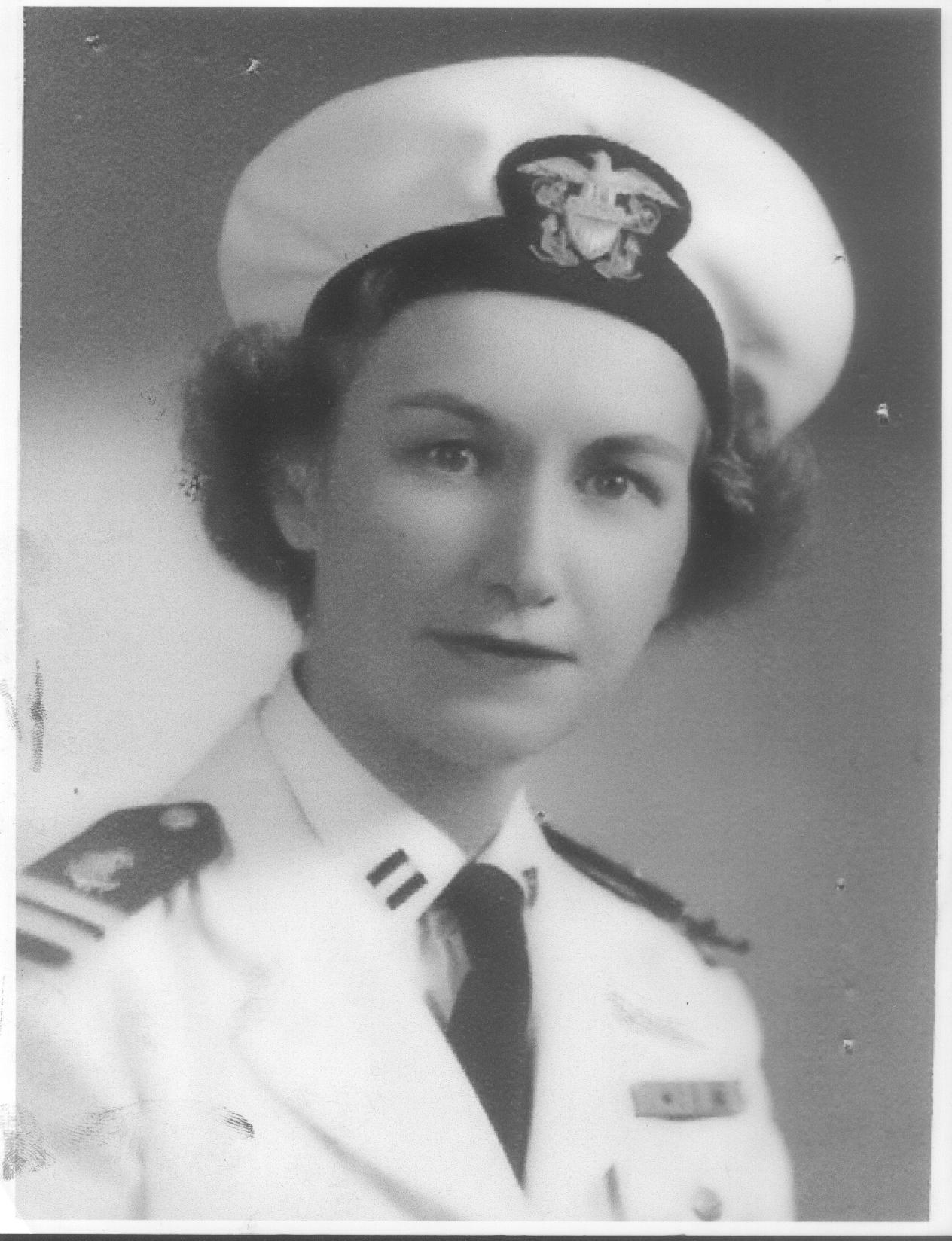
- Born: December 15, 1902; Itasca, Texas, U.S.
- Died: July 21, 2000 (aged 97) Houston, Texas, U.S.
- Allegiance: United States of America
- Branch: United States Navy
- Service years: 1930–1954
- Rank: Captain, USN
- Commands: Director of the United States Navy Nurse Corps, 1950–1954
- Conflicts: World War II; Korean War
- Awards: American Defense Service Medal with Base Clasp; Asiatic–Pacific Campaign Medal; World War II Victory Medal

Winnie Gibson (1902–2000) was the second director of the United States Navy Nurse Corps, serving in that position from 1950 to 1954.

== Navy Nurse Corps career ==
Captain Gibson graduated from Seton Hospital, Austin, Texas, in May 1923, and worked in civilian hospitals for seven years. She became a registered nurse in December 1930.

After joining the United States Navy Nurse Corps in 1930, she served at Naval Hospital, Philadelphia, Pennsylvania, and Naval Hospital, New York City. In January 1934, she attended the School of Nursing, Graduate School of Medicine at University of Pennsylvania in Philadelphia for instruction in anesthesia. In May 1934 she was assigned as Operating Room Supervisor and Anesthetist at Naval Hospital, New York City, and was subsequently assigned to the same duties at Quantico, Virginia. In 1937, she was assigned to the USS Relief (AH-1). After her tour on the Relief, she was assigned as Anesthetist at Naval Hospital, Mare Island, California, and then as Anesthetist and Operating Room Supervisor at Naval Hospital, Pearl Harbor, Hawaii. She was at Naval Hospital, Pearl Harbor, on 7 December 1941. In following tours, she was assigned as Chief Nurse at the Naval Hospitals in Jacksonville, Florida; Annapolis, Maryland; and Houston, Texas.

Her last tour before being selected as Director was as Chief Nurse, U. S. Naval Hospital, Naval Medical Center, Guam, Marianas Islands.

=== Director ===
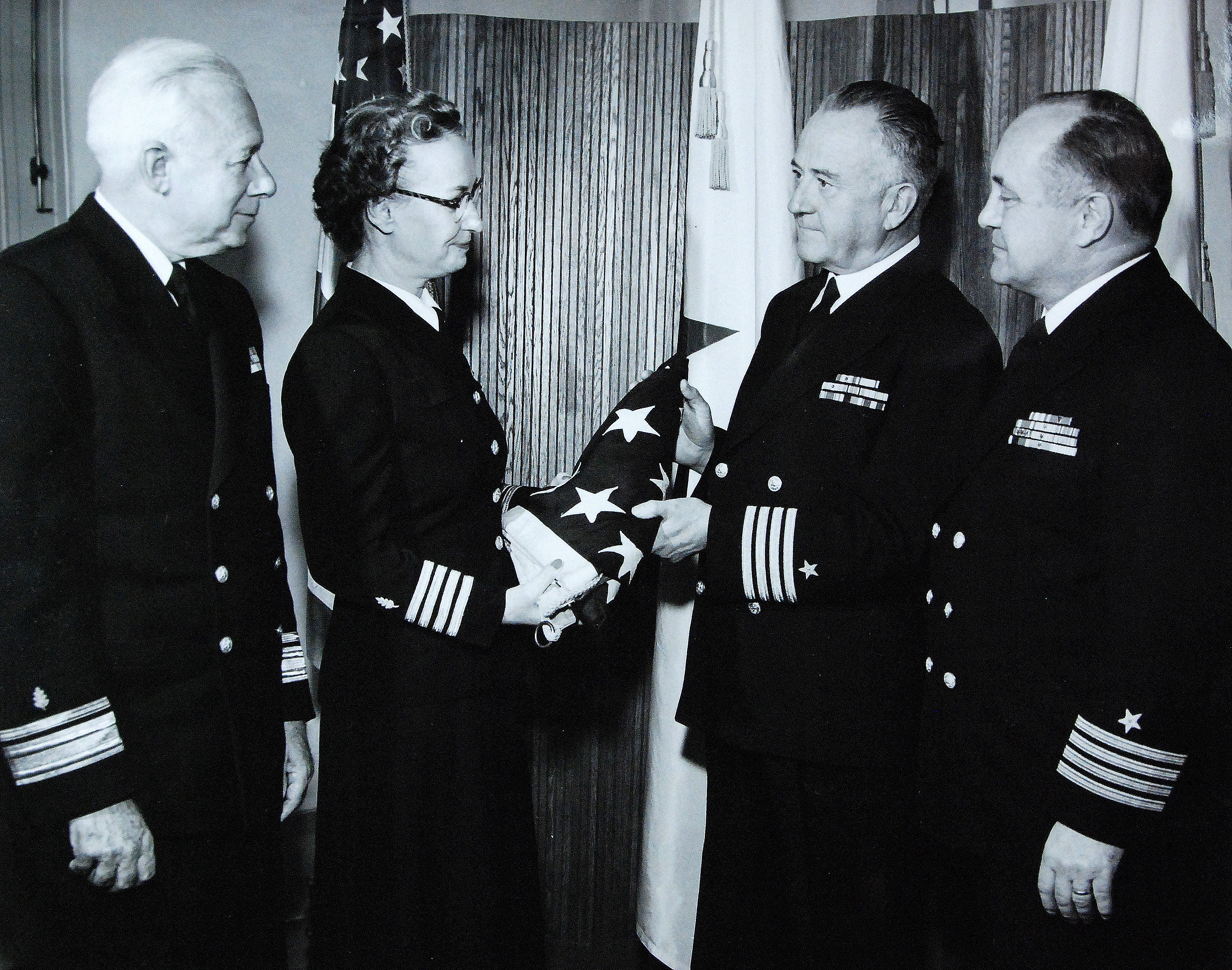
Gibson, director of the Navy Nurse Corps, receives the battle flag of the USS Higbee from Rear Admiral Lamont Pugh, Surgeon General of the United States Navy. Named for Lenah Higbee, the USS Higbee was the first U.S. Navy warship to be named for a female member of the U.S. Navy.

During the Korean War, Captain Gibson presided over a Nurse Corps that was required to involuntarily recall Reserve nurses at the rate of 125 per week and "freeze" those on active duty. She retired from active duty on 1 May 1954.

== Later life ==
Gibson retired to Ohio, then to Texas. She died on 21 July 2000, and is buried at Restland Memorial Park in Dallas, Texas.

Preceded by Nellie Jane DeWitt	Director, Navy Nurse Corps; 1950–1954	Succeeded by Wilma Leona Jackson
