= Mariann Stratton =

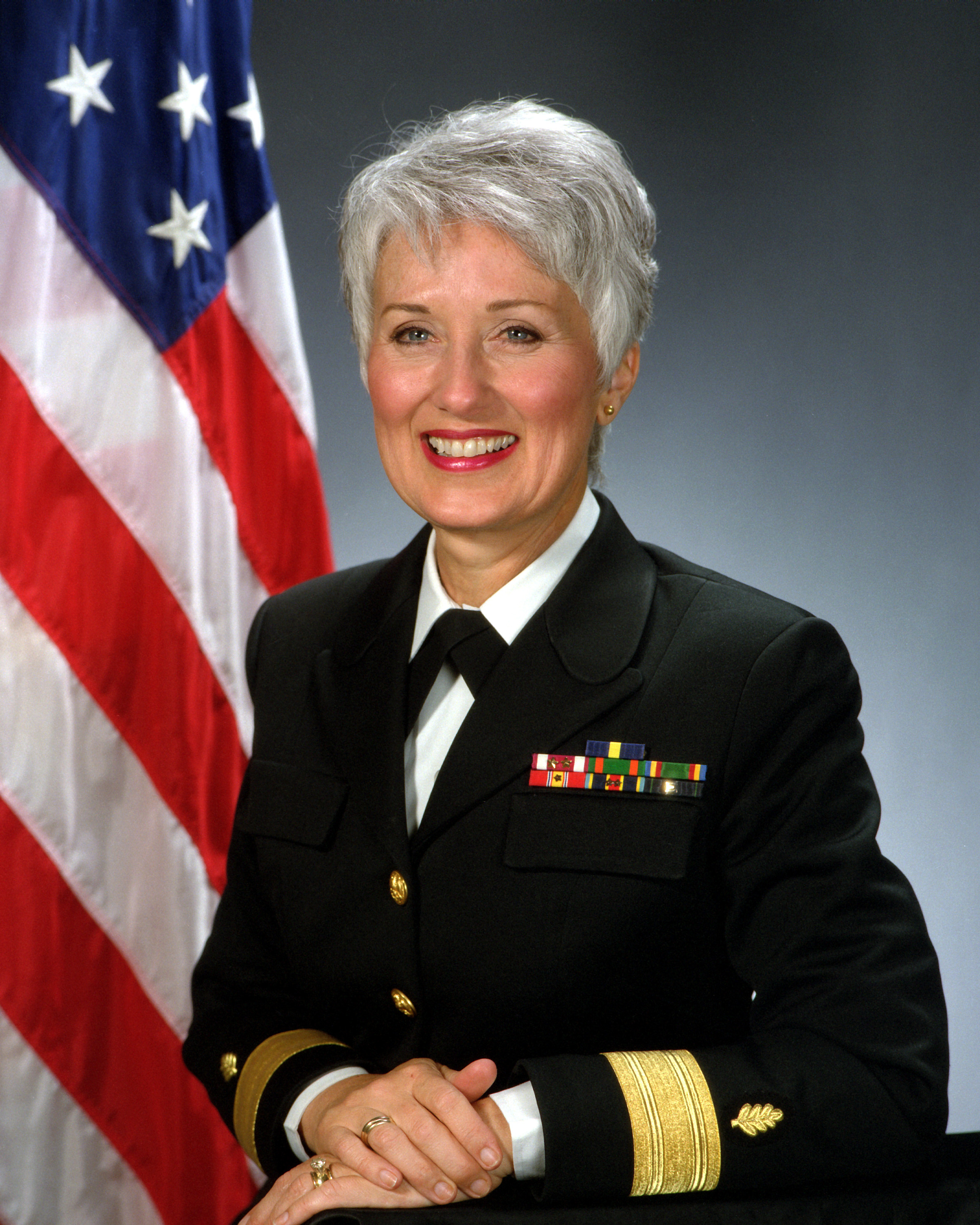
- Rear Admiral Mariann Stratton in 1994
- Born: July 23, 1945 (age 81); Houston, Texas
- Military career
- Allegiance: United States
- Branch: United States Navy
- Service years: 1964–1994
- Rank: Rear Admiral
- Commands: United States Navy Nurse Corps
- Awards: Navy Distinguished Service Medal; Meritorious Service Medal (3); Navy Achievement Medal

Rear Admiral Mariann Stratton (born 1945) was the Director of the United States Navy Nurse Corps from 1991 to 1994.

== Early life and education ==
Mariann Stratton was born in Houston, Texas. Stratton joined the Navy Nurse Corps in 1964, and attended school on a Navy Nurse Corps Candidate Scholarship. She graduated from Sacred Heart Dominican College in Houston, Texas with degrees in nursing and English. Later she earned master's degrees in nursing from the University of Virginia and in human resource management from Webster College.

== Naval career ==
Stratton started active duty in 1966. She served in the United States, Japan, Ethiopia, Greece, and Italy. She was director of nursing services at the Naval Hospital in San Diego. In 1971 she attended the celebration in Hartford, Connecticut, marking the 63rd anniversary of the founding of the Navy Nurse Corps.

Stratton became Director of the Navy Nurse Corps in 1991, and was promoted to the rank of rear admiral (lower half). She served concurrently as deputy commander for Personnel Management, Naval Medical Command. In 1993, she published Nurse Corps Strategic Plan – Charting New Horizons. As director, Stratton led the "Working Group on Prevention of Sexual Harassment for Women in the Navy and Marine Corps" after the Tailhook scandal. She advocated before Congress for equal promotion opportunities for military women.

Stratton retired from the navy in 1994. In 1996, she was awarded the Distinguished Alumnae Award by the University of Virginia Women's Center.

== Personal life ==
Stratton married United States Air Force pilot Lawrence Mallory Stickney. He died in 1992. There is a Lawrence M. Stickney/Mariann Stratton Scholarship in the School of Nursing at the University of Virginia.

== See also ==
- Women in the United States Navy

Military offices
Preceded by Mary Fields Hall	Director, Navy Nurse Corps; 1991–1994	Succeeded by Joan Marie Engel
