= Wilma Leona Jackson =

- Nickname: Leona
- Born: September 1, 1909; Union, Ohio, U.S.
- Died: March 23, 1998 (aged 88) Dayton, Ohio, U.S.
- Allegiance: United States
- Branch: United States Navy
- Service years: 1936–1958
- Rank: Captain
- Commands: Director of the United States Navy Nurse Corps, 1954–1958
- Conflicts: World War II
- Awards: Commentation Ribbon; American Defense Service Medal; Asiatic-Pacific Campaign Medal; National Defense Service Medal
- Alma mater: Columbia University (BS, MA)

Wilma Leona Jackson was an American nurse and military official who served as the third director of the United States Navy Nurse Corps, serving in that position from 1954 to 1958.

== Early life and education ==
Wilma Leona Jackson was born to Roy and Carrie (Furnas) Class in Union, Ohio in 1909. She attended the Butler Centralized School in Vandalia, Ohio, graduating in 1927. In September 1930, she graduated from nurse's training school at Miami Valley Hospital in Dayton, Ohio. She earned a Bachelor of Science and Master of Arts degree in nursing administration from Columbia University.

== Career ==
Leona Jackson was appointed to the United States Navy Nurse Corps on 6 July 1936. She served her first few years, from 1936 until 1939 at the Naval Hospital, Philadelphia, Pennsylvania and then at the Naval Hospital, Brooklyn, New York from 1939 to 1940.

In 1940, then-Ensign Jackson was assigned to the Naval Hospital, Guam, Marianas Islands. In December 1941, two days after Pearl Harbor, the Japanese invaded and took all personnel prisoner. Jackson and three other nurses, under the supervision of Chief Nurse Marian Olds, continued to work at the hospital until they were transported to Japan where they were held as prisoners of war until August 1942 when they were repatriated through Mozambique.

Jackson was promoted to lieutenant (junior grade) in 1943 and then, in 1944, she was assigned to the Navy's Bureau of Medicine and Surgery in Washington, D.C. After her promotion to lieutenant in 1944, she returned to Guam where she was assigned to Fleet Hospital #103. She was the senior nurse corps officer in the Island Command until her transfer in December 1945.

Jackson served as an education officer in the Nursing Section of the Bureau of Medicine and Surgery in 1950 and as a nurse at the Naval Hospital Oakland in 1952. She became the chief nurse of the Naval Medical Center Portsmouth in 1953. She became director of the United States Navy Nurse Corps in 1954 and retired in 1958.

== Personal life ==
Jackson retired to Ohio. She died on 23 March 1998 at the Veteran's Administration Medical Center in Dayton, Ohio, and is buried at Polk Grove Cemetery in Vandalia, Ohio.

Preceded by Winnie Gibson	Director of the Navy Nurse Corps; 1954-1958	Succeeded by Ruth Agatha Houghton
