= Goldia O'Haver =

American Navy nurse and POW during WWII (1902–1997)

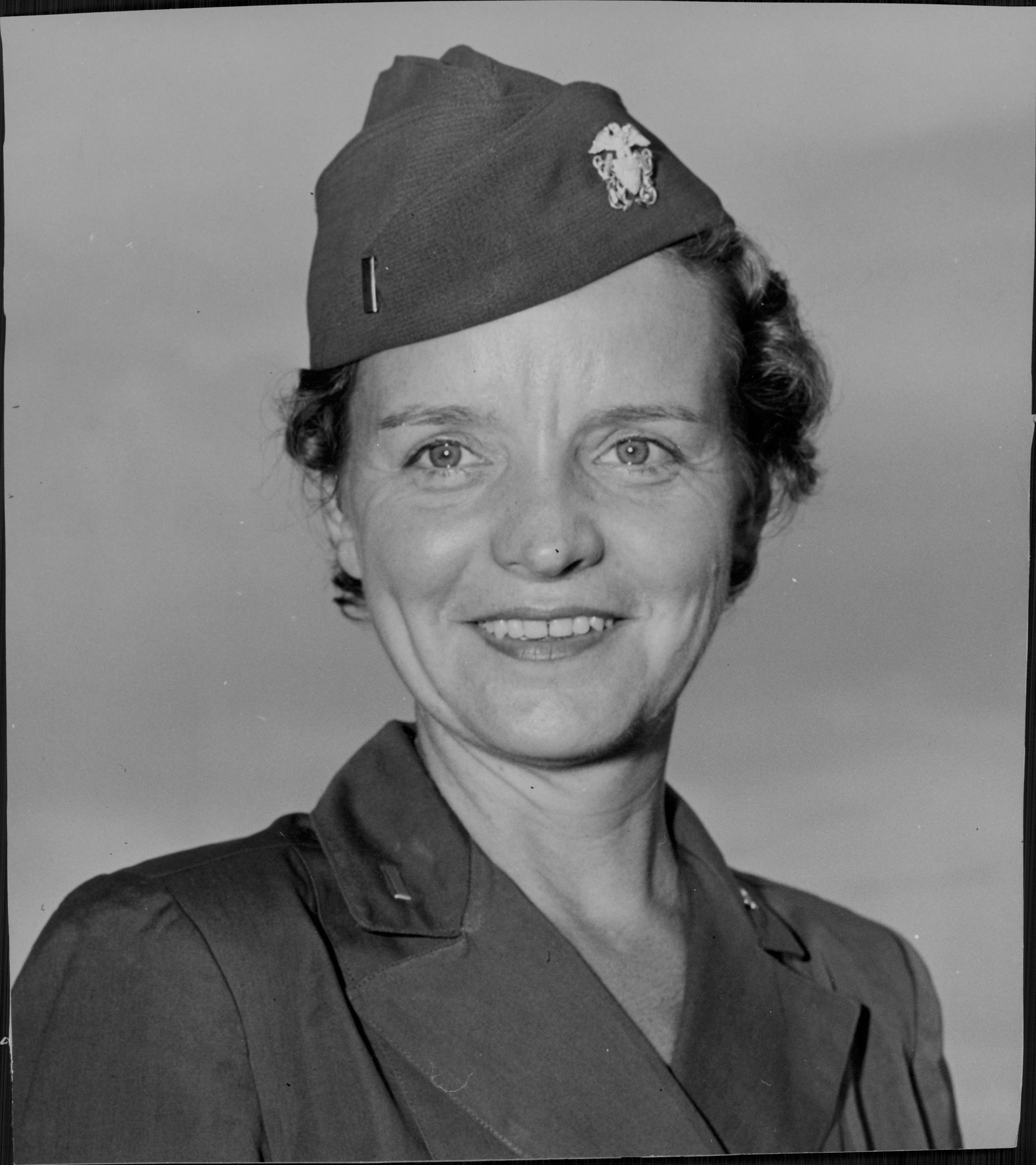
- Born: Goldia Aimee O'Haver; December 3, 1902; Rock Island County, Illinois, U.S.
- Died: April 30, 1997 (aged 94); Apple Valley, California, U.S.
- Other names: Goldie O'Haver, Goldia O'Haver Merrill (after marriage)
- Occupation: Nurse
- Known for: Prisoner of war in the Philippines during World War II

Goldia Aimee O'Haver Merrill (December 3, 1902 – April 30, 1997) was a United States Navy nurse who was held a prisoner of war in the Philippines during World War II, one of the Twelve Anchors.

== Early life ==
Goldia O'Haver was born December 3, 1902, in Rock Island County, Illinois, the daughter of Joel Landon O'Haver and Cora Belle Hatton O'Haver. Her father was living in Hayfield, Minnesota during World War II.

== Navy nurse ==
O'Haver joined the U.S. Navy as a surgical nurse in 1929. During World War II, she was stationed at Cañacao Hospital near Cavite Naval Base in the Philippines. In January 1942, she and eleven other navy nurses were among the Americans taken prisoner by Japanese troops in Manila. In May 1943, the navy nurses agreed to transfer to a prisoner of war camp in Los Baños. The 12 nurses built up an empty infirmary and cared for other prisoners, despite minimal supplies and chronic malnutrition.

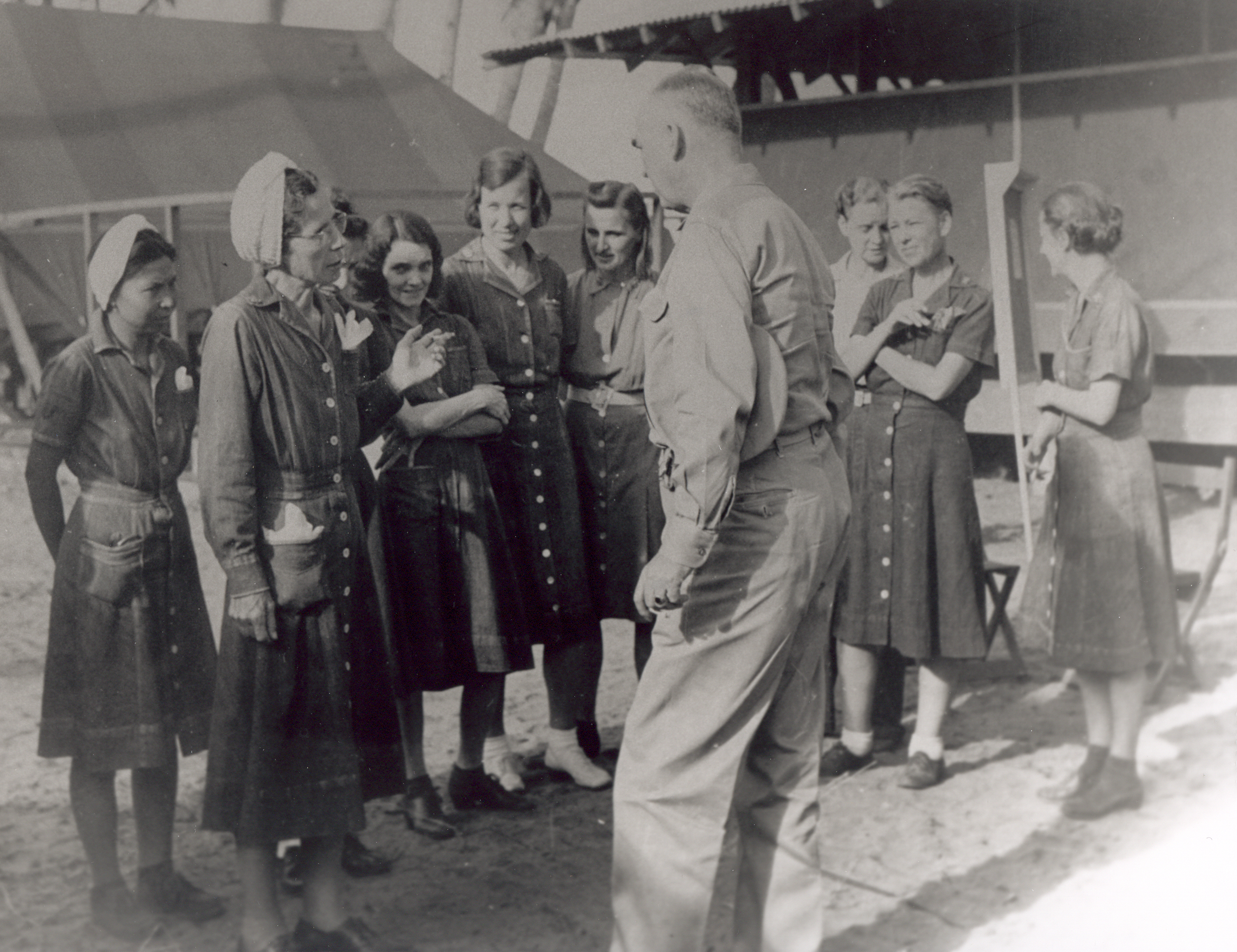
In this 1945 image of the Navy nurses rescued from Los Baños prison camp, the women are wearing makeshift denim uniforms sewn by Goldia O'Haver.

O'Haver, one of the older nurses in the group, was a skilled seamstress; she used a sewing machine and scrap fabrics to make denim uniforms, muslin sheets, surgical gowns, and pajamas for the infirmary's patients. She was held as a prisoner of war until February 1945, when the Los Baños prison camp was liberated. She was hospitalized in San Francisco upon return to the United States.

For her wartime service, O'Haver was awarded a Gold Star and a Bronze Star in September 1945, while she was working at a naval hospital in Long Beach.

== Personal life ==
Goldia O'Haver married Robert Heath Merrill, a fellow prisoner of war, soon after their release in 1945. She retired from the Navy Nurse Corps in 1946, and the couple lived in Apple Valley, California. She was widowed in 1985, and she died in 1997, aged 94, in Apple Valley. Her name, along with the names of the other military nurse POWs, is on a historical marker in Cavite City in the Philippines.
