= Joan Marie Engel =

Admiral and director of Naval nurse corps

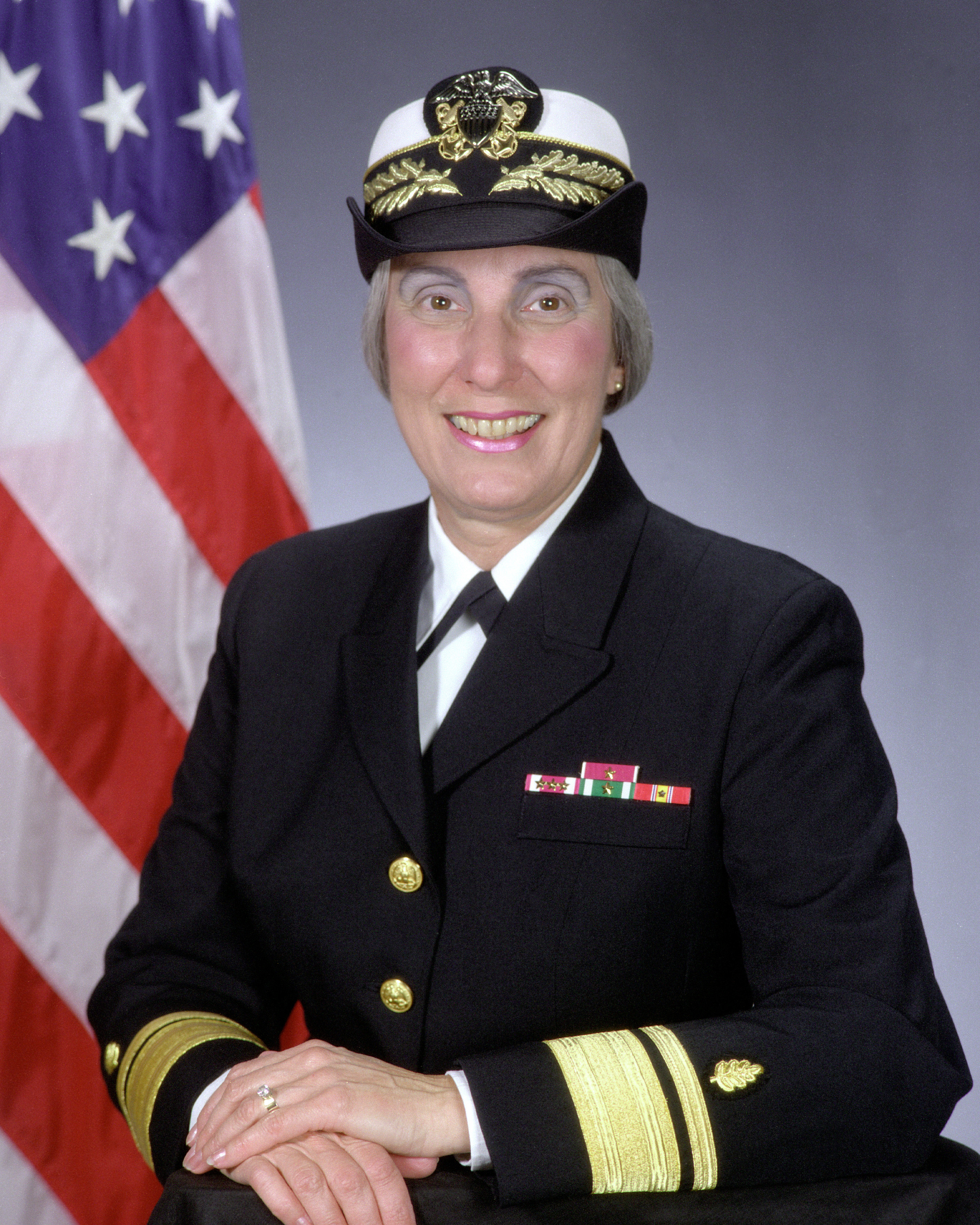
- Rear Admiral Engel in 1997
- Born: December 9, 1940 (age 85); St. Marys, Pennsylvania, United States
- Military career
- Allegiance: United States of America
- Branch: United States Navy
- Service years: 1969–2000
- Rank: Rear Admiral
- Commands: 18th Director of the United States Navy Nurse Corps
- Awards: Legion of Merit (2); Meritorious Service Medal (4); Navy Commendation Medal (2)

Rear Admiral Joan Marie Engel (born December 9, 1940) held the position as the 18th Director of the Navy Nurse Corps from September 1994 to August 1998. She concurrently served as deputy commander for personnel management in the Health Sciences, Education and Training Command, and later as assistant chief for Education, Training and Personnel.

== Early life ==
Rear Adm. Engel was born in St. Marys, Pennsylvania in 1940. She was the first school nurse at Elk County Christian High School.

== Navy Nurse Corps career ==
Engel entered the Navy Nurse Corps in 1969 as a lieutenant. She served in various stateside and overseas naval hospitals, progressing in rank with jobs of increasing responsibility. She became deputy director of the Nurse Corps, serving under the RADM Mariann Stratton, the 17th Navy Nurse Corps director.

Clinical nursing assignments included assignments at the Naval Hospital, Millington, TN; Branch Medical Clinic, Iwakuni, Japan; Branch Medical Clinic, LaMaddalena, Sardinia; and Naval Hospitals in Charleston, SC, Jacksonville, FL, Newport, RI, and Pensacola, FL.

Engel's administrative assignments included being the first junior Nurse Detailer, BUMED; the first Assistant Chief of Staff, Logistics, Naval Medical Command, Northeast Region, Great Lakes, IL; Naval Inspector General staff, Washington, D.C., and Naval Medical Inspector General staff, BUMED; and deputy director, Navy Nurse Corps, BUMED.

She served as the 18th Director, Navy Nurse Corps from October 1994 until August 1998.

Rear Admiral Engel retired in January 2000 as the Assistant Chief, Operational Medicine and Fleet Support, Bureau of Medicine and Surgery, Washington, DC, a position she held since August 1996.

== Education ==
RADM Engel received her nursing diploma from the Mercy Hospital School of Nursing in Buffalo, New York in 1961. She earned a bachelor's degree in public school nursing from Clarion University in Pennsylvania in 1969. In 1980, she earned a Master of Science in nursing from the University of Alabama School of Nursing. She is a Fellow in the American Academy of Nursing, a Wharton Fellow and holds an honorary fellowship in the American Academy of Medical Administrators.

== Awards ==
Engel has earned the Legion of Merit (two awards), the Meritorious Service Medal (four awards), the Navy Commendation Medal (two awards), and the National Defense Medal with bronze star. In 1998, the Clarion University Alumni Association presented her with the Distinguished Alumni Award.

- Legion of Merit with Gold Star
- Meritorious Service Medal with three Gold Stars
- Navy and Marine Corps Commendation Medal with Gold Star
- National Defense Service Medal with bronze star

== See also ==
- Navy Nurse Corps
- Women in the United States Navy

Military offices
Preceded by Mariann Stratton	Director, Navy Nurse Corps; 1994–1998	Succeeded by Kathleen L. Martin
