= Mary Fields Hall =

United States Navy admiral (1934–2022)

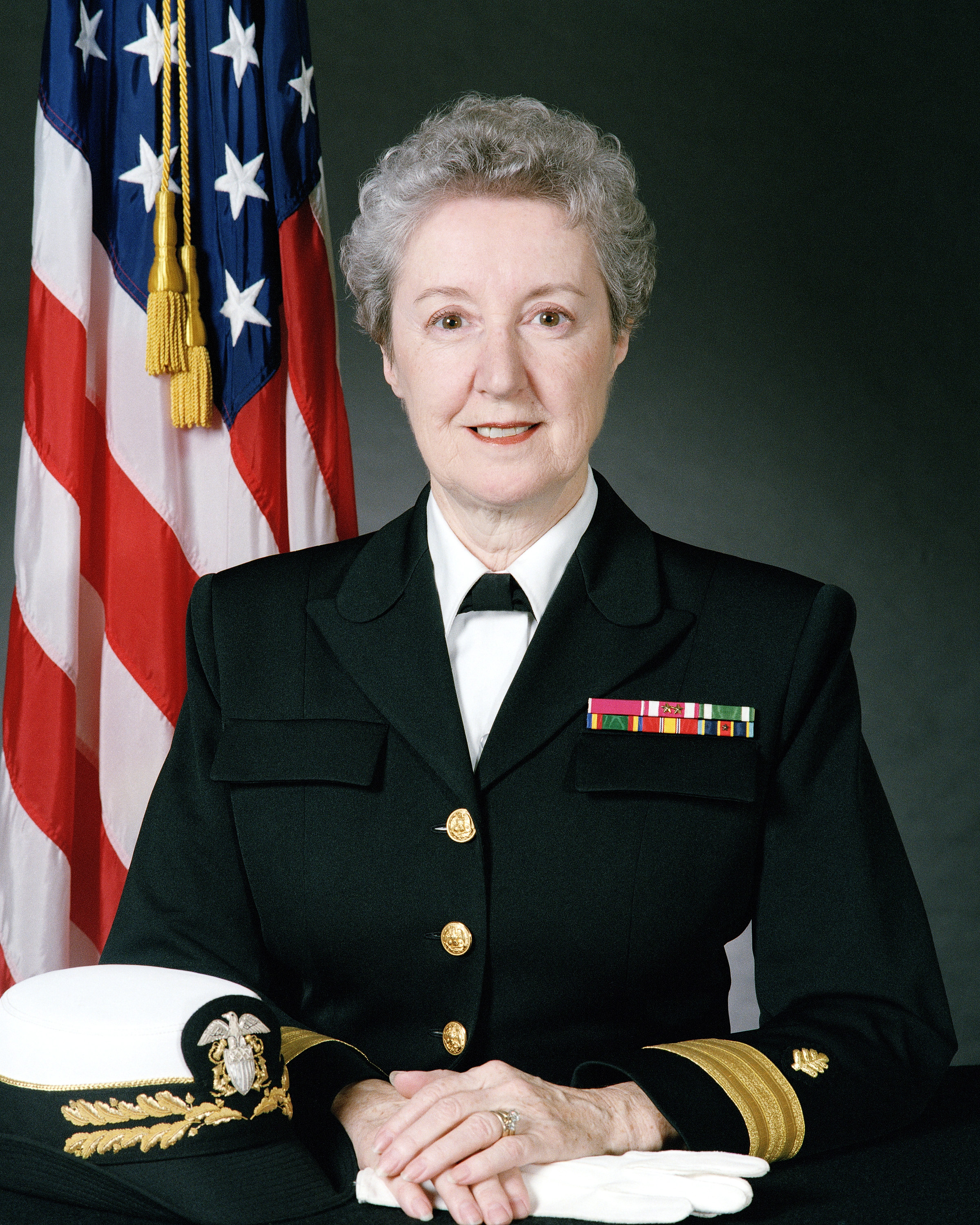
- Rear Adm. Hall in 1988
- Born: October 14, 1934; Philadelphia, Pennsylvania, United States
- Died: July 21, 2022 (aged 87)
- Military career
- Allegiance: US
- Branch: United States Navy
- Service years: 1959–1991
- Rank: Rear Admiral
- Commands: Director of the United States Navy Nurse Corps; Naval Hospital, Guantanamo Bay, Cuba; Naval Hospital, Long Beach, California
- Awards: Distinguished Service Medal

Mary Fields Hall (October 14, 1934 – July 21, 2022) was the Director of the Navy Nurse Corps from 1987 to 1991. She was the first U. S. military nurse to command a hospital. She became the commanding officer at Naval Hospital, Guantanamo Bay, Cuba, in July 1983, and later commanded Naval Hospital, Long Beach, California.

== Early life ==
Mary Fields Hall was born in 1934 in Pennsylvania. She earned a nursing diploma from Episcopal Hospital School of Nursing, Philadelphia, in 1955.

== Navy Nurse Corps career ==
She joined the Navy Nurse Corps in 1959. While in the Nurse Corps, she earned a Bachelor of Science degree from the Boston University in 1966 and a Master of Science degree in nursing service administration from the University of Maryland in 1973.

She became the commanding officer at Naval Hospital, Guantanamo Bay, Cuba, in July 1983, and later commanded Naval Hospital, Long Beach, California.

She became director of the Navy Nurse Corps in 1987, and was promoted to the rank of Rear Admiral (lower half). She served concurrently as deputy commander for Personnel Management, Naval Medical Command.

== See also ==
- Navy Nurse Corps
- Women in the United States Navy

Preceded by Mary Joan Nielubowicz	Director, Navy Nurse Corps; 1987–1991	Succeeded by Mariann Stratton
