= Myn Hoffman =

American nursing administrator (1883-1951)

Myn M. Hoffman
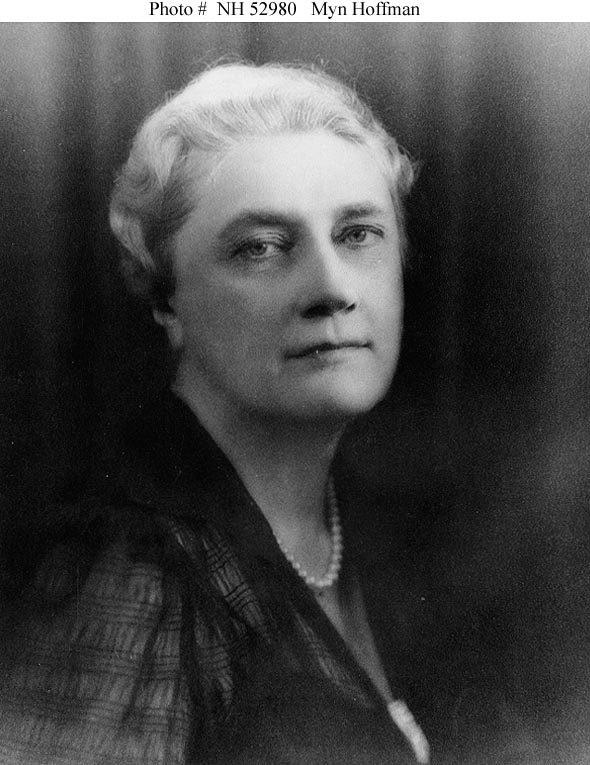
- LCDR Myn M. Hoffman, USN (NC)
- Born: May 12, 1883; Bradford, Illinois, U.S.
- Died: January 5, 1951 (aged 67) Bronxville, New York, U.S.
- Allegiance: United States of America
- Branch: Navy, Nurse Corps
- Service years: 1917– 1938
- Rank: LCDR
- Commands: 4th Superintendent of the United States Navy Nurse Corps
- Conflicts: World War I

Myn M. Hoffman (1883-1951) was the fourth Superintendent of the United States Navy Nurse Corps.

== Early life ==
Hoffman was born in Bradford, Illinois on May 12, 1883. After several years as an educator, she attended St. Joseph's Hospital Training School for Nurses in Denver, Colorado, graduating in 1915.

== Career ==
Hoffman entered the Navy Nurse Corps in February 1917 and was promoted to Chief Nurse two years later. During the First World War and in the post-war era, she served at several naval hospitals, including that at Washington, D.C.

In 1934, Chief Nurse Hoffman was appointed Assistant Superintendent of the Navy Nurse Corps and became the Corps' fourth Superintendent in January 1935.

She retired from the Navy in October 1938. When Navy Nurses were included in the Navy's ranking system, she received the rank of Lieutenant Commander in recognition of her service as Superintendent of the Navy Nurse Corps.

Hoffman died in Bronxville, New York, on January 5, 1951, aged 67.

Preceded by Josephine Beatrice Bowman	Superintendent, Navy Nurse Corps; 1935-1938	Succeeded by Sue S. Dauser
