= Joan Bynum =

United States Navy nurse

Captain Joan C. Bynum (retired)
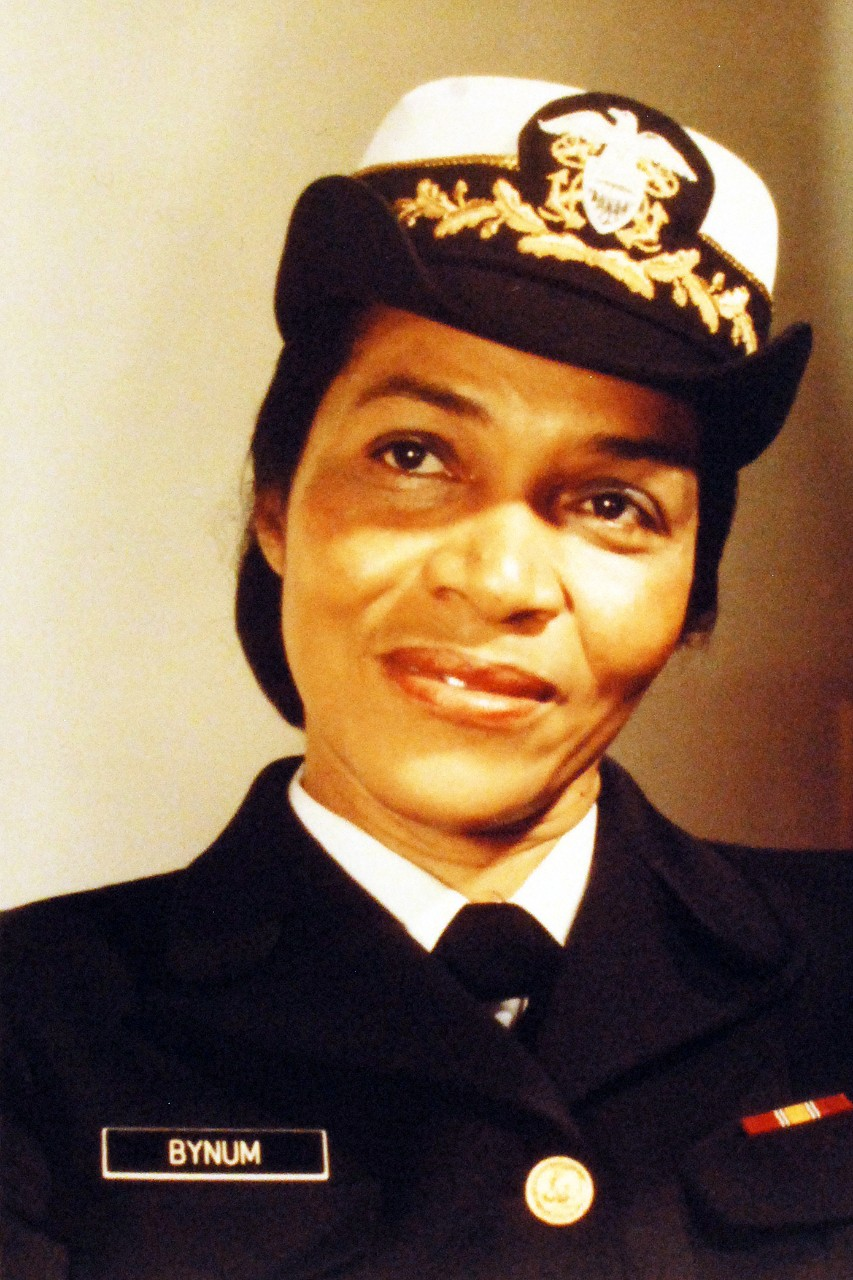
- Born: September 5, 1934 (age 91); Gary, Indiana
- Allegiance: United States
- United States Navy Nurse Corps: Navy
- Service years: 1958-1981
- Rank: Captain
- Awards: National Defense Service Medal
- Alma mater: Meharry Medical College; Indiana University

Joan Carolyn Bynum (born September 5, 1934) was an African-American United States Navy nurse. In 1978, she became the first black woman to be promoted to the rank of Captain in the 203-year history of the U.S. Navy.

== Biography ==
Bynum was born on September 5, 1943, in Gary, Indiana. Growing up in Gary during World War II, she remembered her uncle's letters home while serving in the Navy as a petty officer. Inspired by his service, it became her dream to serve in the Navy. Bynum attended Meharry Medical College and earned a Bachelor of Science degree in nursing in 1957. After passing her state licensing board examinations, she and enlisted in the Navy as an ensign in 1958.

=== Navy service ===
Bynum's first tour of duty was in California, where served two years at Naval Hospital San Diego. Early in her career, she was assigned to duty stations in Portsmouth, Virginia, Chelsea, New York and Rota, Spain. She became a lieutenant commander in January 1966. During her Navy service, Bynum recalled experiencing discrimination both by virtue of her race and also due to her gender.

Bynum was later transferred to Naval Station Great Lakes where she worked in the labor and delivery ward, infectious disease unit and coronary care unit. While serving at Naval Station Great Lakes, Bynum applied for a Navy scholarship for graduate school. She was accepted and enrolled in a pediatric nursing program at Indiana University. Bynum graduated from Indiana University in 1971.

=== Captain appointment ===
In 1978, Bynum was a pediatrics nurse stationed in Yokosuka, Japan when she was promoted to the rank of captain. She was 44 years old and had twenty years of Naval service. With her promotion, she became the first black woman to attain the rank of captain in the 203-year history of the United States Navy.

After her appointment, Captain Bynum served as the assistant director of Nursing at Naval Hospital Yokosuka. Bynum retired from the Navy in 1981.
