= Women in the United States Navy =

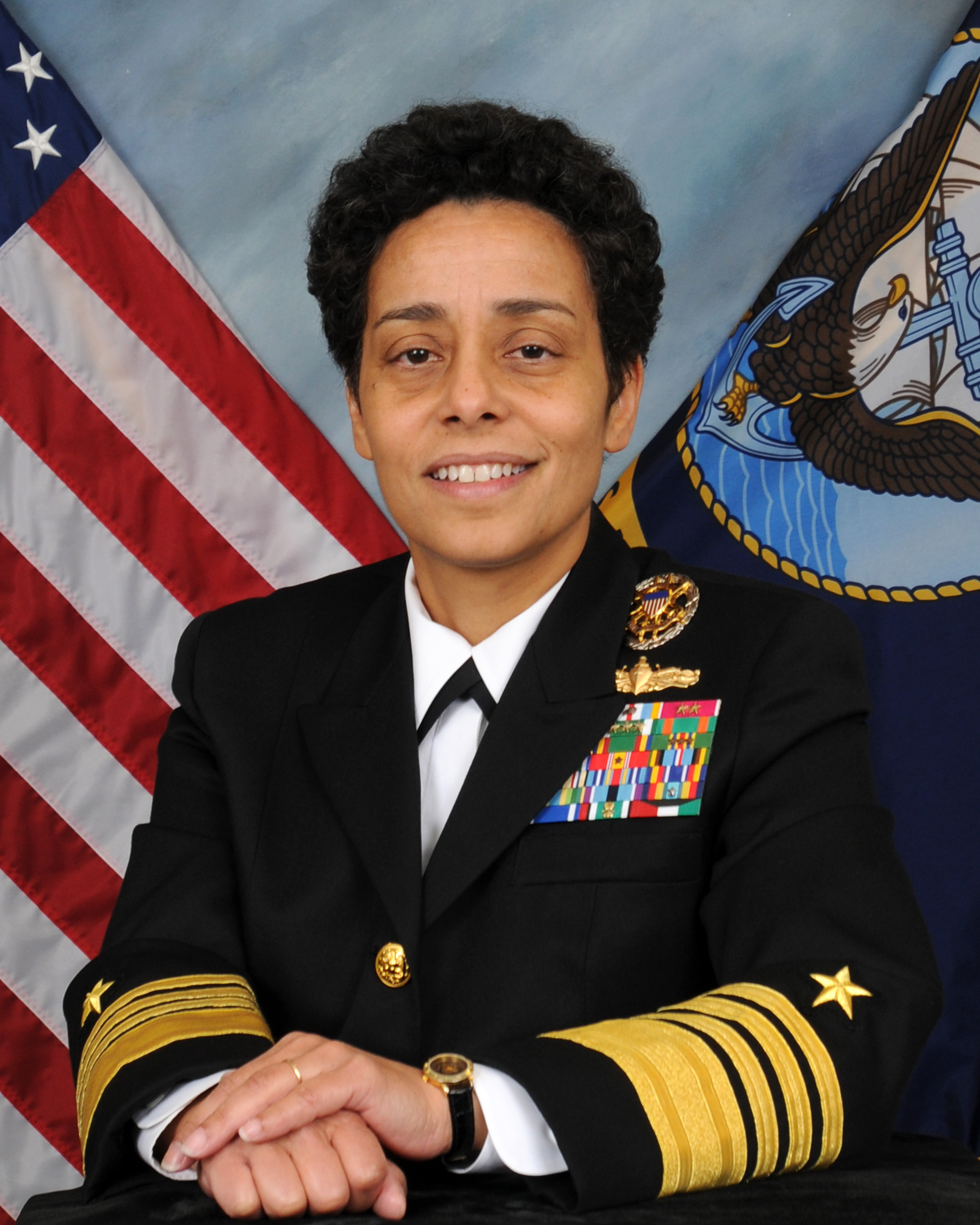
Admiral Michelle J. Howard became the first female four-star admiral in the U.S. Navy in 2014. This also made her the U.S. armed forces' first Black woman to achieve four stars.

Many women have served in the United States Navy for over a century. As of 2020, there were 69,629 total women on active duty in the US Navy, with 11,076 serving as officers, and 58,553 enlisted. Of all the branches in the US military, the Navy has the second highest percentage of female active duty service members (after the US Air Force) with women making up 20% of the US Navy in 2020.

As of 2025, no woman has been able to finish the process to become a Navy SEAL. In 2019, a woman successfully completed SEAL Officer Assessment and Selection (SOAS), but opted to join another unit of the Navy before reaching the 24-week Basic Underwater Demolition/SEAL (BUD/S) training. She was among five women who had participated in the SOAS screening process.

In July 2021, the first woman graduated from the Naval Special Warfare (NSW) training program to become a Special Warfare Combatant craft Crewman (SWCC). The SWCC directly supports the SEALs and other commando units, and are experts in covert insertion and extraction special operations tactics.

In November 2023, the United States Senate voted 95-1 to confirm Admiral Lisa Franchetti as Chief of Naval Operations, making Franchetti the first woman to be Chief of Naval Operations and, due to having that position, the first woman on the Joint Chiefs of Staff.

== History ==
Note that some minor wars in which women served have been omitted from this history.

=== Pre–World War I ===
Women worked as nurses for the Union Navy during the American Civil War. In 1890, Ann Bradford Stokes, who during the American Civil War had worked as a nurse on the navy hospital ship USS Red Rover, where she assisted Sisters of the Holy Cross, was granted a pension of $12 a month, making her the first American woman to receive a pension for her own service in the Navy. She was not, however, the first woman to receive a pension for her military service. Margaret Corbin and Deborah Sampson both received pensions for their service in the American Revolutionary War.

The United States Navy Nurse Corps was officially established in 1908; it was all-female until 1965. After the establishment of the Nurse Corps in 1908 by an Act of Congress, twenty women were selected as the first members and assigned to the Naval Medical School Hospital in Washington, D.C. However, the navy did not provide room or board for them, and so the nurses rented their own house and provided their own meals. In time, the nurses would come to be known as "The Sacred Twenty" because they were the first women to serve formally as members of the Navy. The "Sacred Twenty" were Mary H. Du Bose; Adah M. Pendleton; Elizabeth M. Hewitt; Della V. Knight; Josephine Beatrice Bowman; Lenah H. Sutcliffe Higbee; Esther Voorhees Hasson, the first Superintendent of the Navy Nurse Corps, 1908–1911; Martha E. Pringle; Elizabeth J. Wells; Clare L. De Ceu.; Elizabeth Leonhardt; Estelle Hine; Ethel R. Parsons; Florence T. Milburn; Boniface T. Small; Victoria White; Isabelle Rose Roy; Margaret D. Murray; Sara B. Myer; and Sara M. Cox. The Nurse Corps gradually expanded to 160 on the eve of World War I. For a few months in 1913, Navy nurses saw their first shipboard service, aboard Mayflower and Dolphin.

=== World War I ===
A WWI-era Navy recruitment poster depicting Bernice Tongate, the first Californian Yeoman (F)

The increased size of the navy in support of World War I increased the need for clerical and administrative support. The U.S. Naval Reserve Act of 1916 permitted the enlistment of qualified "persons" for service; Secretary of the Navy Josephus Daniels asked, "Is there any law that says a Yeoman must be a man?" and was told there was not. Thus, the navy was able to induct its first female sailors into the U.S. Naval Reserve. The first woman to enlist in the U.S. Navy was Loretta Perfectus Walsh on 17 March 1917. She was also the first American active-duty navy woman, and the first woman allowed to serve as a woman in any of the United States armed forces, as anything other than as a nurse. Walsh subsequently became the first woman U.S. Navy petty officer when she was sworn in as Chief Yeoman on 21 March 1917. During World War I Navy women served around the continental U.S. and in France, Guam and Hawaii, mostly as Yeomen (F), but also as radio operators, electricians, draftsmen, pharmacists, photographers, telegraphers, fingerprint experts, chemists, torpedo assemblers and camouflage designers. Some Black women served as Yeomen (F) and were the first Black women to serve as enlisted members of the U.S. armed forces. These first Black women to serve in the navy were 16 Yeomen (F)—the total would rise to 24—from some of "Washington's elite Black families" who "worked in the Muster Roll division at Washington's Navy Yard...." Many women were demobilized when hostilities ceased, and aside from the Nurse Corps, the uniformed Navy once again became exclusively male.

=== World War II and after until the Korean War ===
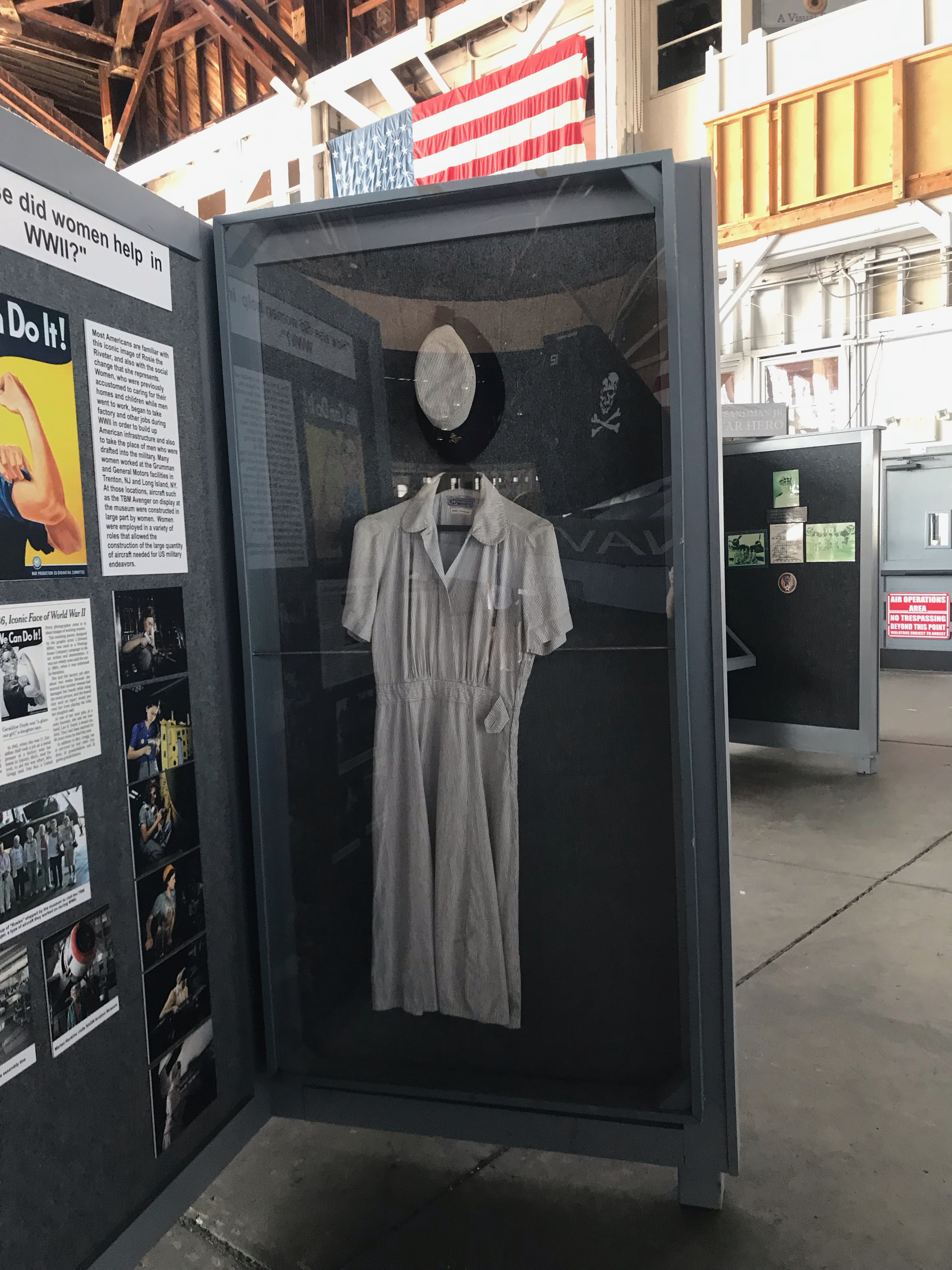
A gray-and-white-striped summer WAVES uniform. Photographed in 2024 at the Naval Air Station Wildwood Aviation Museum.

World War II again brought the need for additional personnel. The Navy organized to recruit women into a separate women's auxiliary, labeled Women Accepted for Volunteer Emergency Service (WAVES), which was created in 1942. WAVES served in varied positions around the continental U.S. and in Hawaii.

Two groups of Navy nurses (Navy nurses were all women then) were held prisoner by the Japanese in World War II. Chief Nurse Marion Olds and nurses Leona Jackson, Lorraine Christiansen, Virginia Fogerty and Doris Yetter were taken prisoner on Guam shortly after Pearl Harbor and transported to Japan. They were repatriated in August 1942, although the newspaper did not identify them as Navy nurses. Chief Nurse Laura Cobb and her nurses, Mary Chapman, Bertha Evans, Helen Gorzelanski, Mary Harrington, Margaret Nash, Goldie O'Haver, Eldene Paige, Susie Pitcher, Dorothy Still and C. Edwina Todd - some of the "Angels of Bataan" - were captured in 1942 in the Philippines and imprisoned in the Los Baños internment camp there, where they continued to function as a nursing unit, until they were rescued by American forces in 1945. Other Los Baños prisoners later said: "We are absolutely certain that had it not been for these nurses many of us who are alive and well would have died." The Angels of Bataan (also known as the "Angels of Bataan and Corregidor" and "The Battling Belles of Bataan") were the members of the Navy Nurse Corps and the Army Nurse Corps who were stationed in the Philippines at the outset of the Pacific War (a theatre of World War II) and served during World War II's Battle of the Philippines (1941–42). When Bataan and Corregidor fell to the Japanese in 1942, they, 11 Navy nurses and 1 nurse-anesthetist (and 66 army nurses) were captured and imprisoned in and around Manila. They were freed in February 1945.

In October 1942, Navy Lieutenant, junior grade Ann A. Bernatitus became the first American recipient of the Legion of Merit. She was also the first person authorized to wear the "V" Device with the award. She was one of the Angels of Bataan and the only U.S. Navy nurse to escape from Bataan and Corregidor during the war.

Also in 1942, Susan Ahn Cuddy, who was Korean-American, became the first Asian-American woman to join the U.S. Navy. By 1946, she had become the first woman gunnery officer in the U.S. Navy and the first Korean-American in U.S. Naval Intelligence.

In 1943, Thelma Bendler Stern, an engineering draftsman, became the first woman assigned to perform duties aboard a United States Navy ship as part of her official responsibilities.

In 1944, Lieutenant Harriet Ida Pickens and Ensign Frances Wills were commissioned as the first African-American female navy officers.

The first Black woman sworn into the Navy Nurse Corps was Phyllis Mae Dailey, a Columbia University student from New York, on 8 March 1945. Three other African American women—Edith Mazie DeVoe, Helen Fredericka Turner, and Eula Lucille Stimley—also became ensigns in the Navy Nurse Corps during the war.

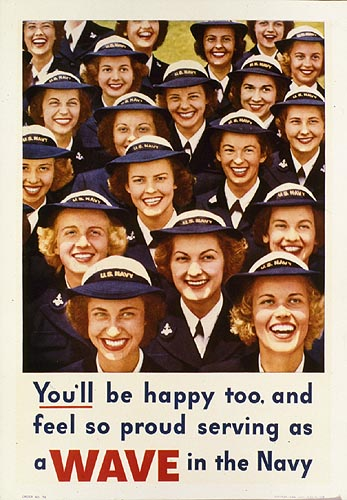
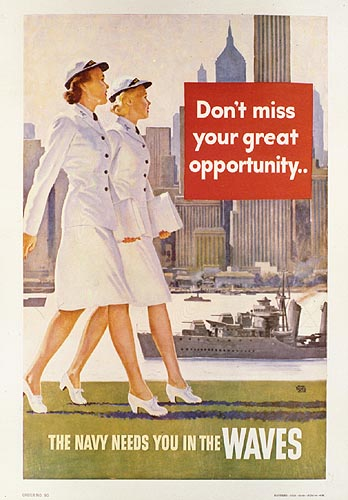
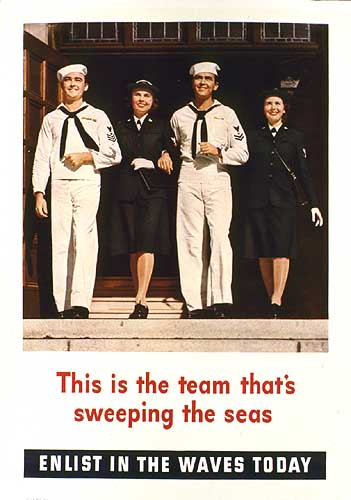
WAVES Recruiting posters

World War II ended in 1945. The Women's Armed Services Integration Act (Pub. L. 80–625, 62 Stat. 356, enacted June 12, 1948) is a United States law that enabled women to serve as permanent, regular members of the armed forces, including the Navy. Prior to this act, women, with the exception of nurses, served in the military only in times of war. However, Section 502 of the act limited service of women by excluding them from aircraft and vessels of the Navy that might engage in combat.

On 7 July 1948 six women, former WAVES, were the first enlisted women to be sworn into in the regular Navy: Chief Yeoman Wilma J. Marchal, Hospital Corpsman First Class Ruth Flora, Aviation Storekeeper First Class Kay L. Langen, Yeoman Second Class Edna Young, Storekeeper Second Class Frances T. Devaney, and Teleman Doris R. Robertson. Edna Young was the only Black woman out of those six, and thus the first Black woman to be enlisted in the regular Navy.

On 15 October 1948, the first eight women officers were commissioned in the regular Navy: Joy Bright Hancock, Winifred Quick Collins, Ann King, Frances Willoughby, Ellen Ford, Doris Cranmore, Doris Defenderfer, and Betty Rae Tennant took their oaths as naval officers.

=== Korean War ===
During this war women (and men) in the Naval Reserve were recalled for duty.

=== Vietnam War ===
Nine Navy women who were not nurses served within the country of Vietnam during the war. Navy nurses served on the hospital ship called USS Sanctuary.

=== Iraq War ===
Women in the Navy served in the Iraq War from 2003-2011.

=== Iran War ===
Women in the Navy served in the 2026 Iran war.

== Women in the navy since 1970 ==
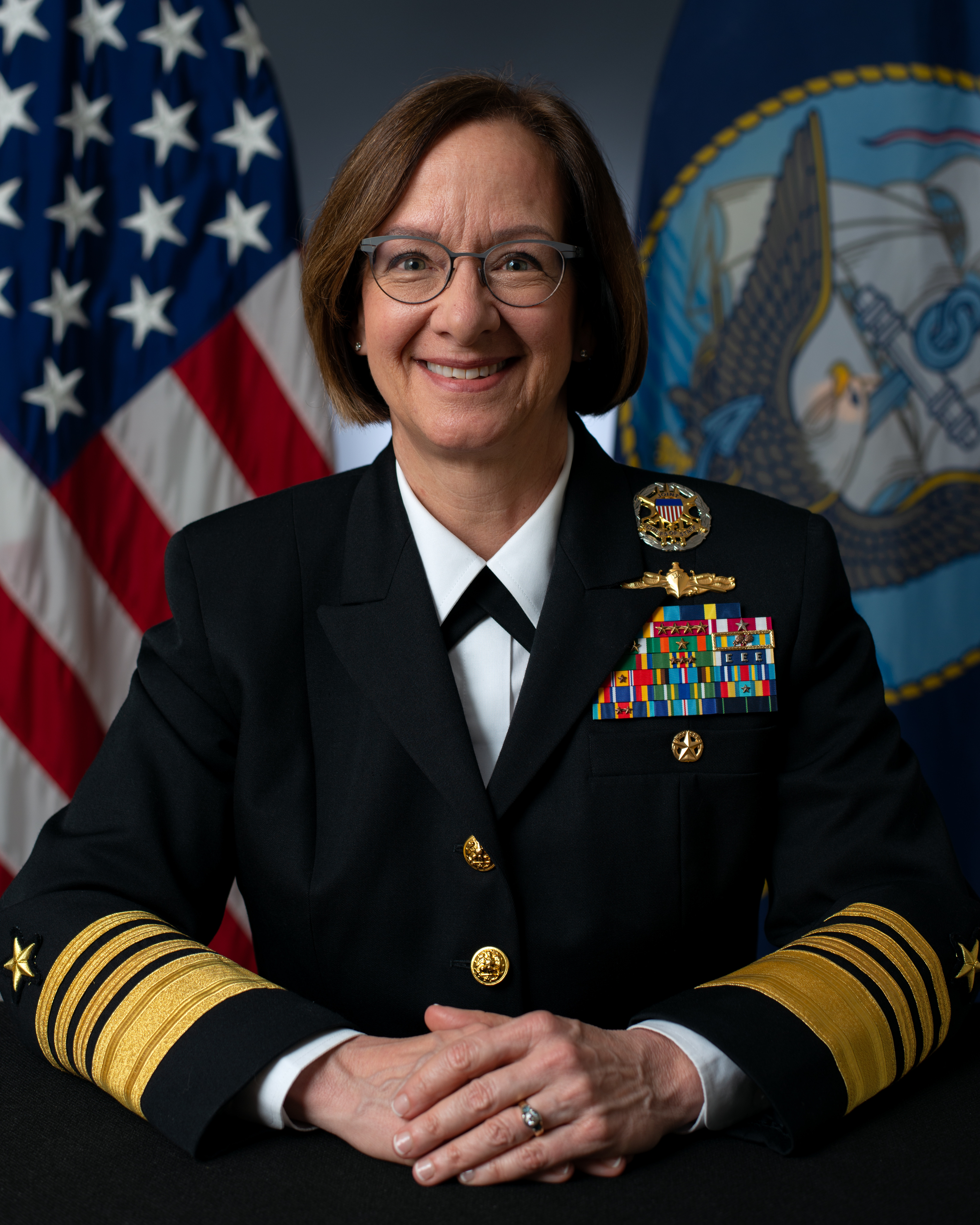
In November 2023 Admiral Lisa Franchetti became the first female Chief of Naval Operations and, due to having that position, the first female member of the Joint Chiefs of Staff.

Major changes occurred for navy women in the 1970s. Alene Duerk became the first female admiral in the navy in 1972. In 1976 RADM Fran McKee became the first female unrestricted line officer appointed to flag rank. In 1978, Judge Sirica decided in favor of Petty Officer Yona Owens, and ruled the law banning navy women from ships to be unconstitutional in the US District Court for the District of Columbia case Owens v. Brown. That year, Congress approved a change to Title 10 USC Section 6015 to permit the navy to assign women to fill sea duty billets on support and noncombatant ships. During the 1970s, women began to enter the surface warfare and aviation fields, gained access to officer accession programs previously open only to men, and started to screen for command opportunities ashore.

Susan Livingstone served as the first female Acting United States Secretary of the Navy from January 24 to February 7 of 2003. Although this is a civilian position, it is included in this article because the Secretary of the Navy is the civilian leader of the Navy (and the Marine Corps).

In December 2015, Defense Secretary Ash Carter stated that starting in 2016 all combat jobs would open to women. In March 2016 Ash Carter approved final plans from military service branches and the U.S. Special Operations Command to open all combat jobs to women, and authorized the military to begin integrating female combat soldiers "right away."

In November 2023, the United States Senate voted 95-1 to confirm Admiral Lisa Franchetti as Chief of Naval Operations, making Franchetti the first woman to be Chief of Naval Operations and, due to having that position, the first woman on the Joint Chiefs of Staff.

=== Aviation ===
In 1972, Roseann Roberts became the first female helicopter plane captain in the navy.

In 1973 the Secretary of the Navy announced the authorization of naval aviation training for women. LTJG Judith Neuffer was the first woman selected for flight training. In 1974, the navy became the first service to graduate a woman pilot, LT Barbara Allen Rainey, followed closely by classmates Judith Neuffer, Ana Marie Fuqua, Rosemary Bryant Mariner, Jane Skiles O'Dea and Joellen Drag.

Women began attending Aviation Officer Candidate School (AOCS) in 1976.

In 1979 the Naval Flight Officer (NFO) program opened to women.

Also in 1979, Lt. Lynn Spruill became the first woman naval aviator to obtain carrier qualification.

In 1989, Patricia Denkler becomes the first woman naval aviator to be carrier qualified in a jet aircraft when she lands aboard the USS Lexington.

On Nov. 15, 1994, Navy Lt. Kimberly “Face” Dyson became the first female pilot to fly an official combat mission for the American military.

=== Benefits ===
Frontiero v. Richardson, 411 U.S. 677 (1973), was a landmark Supreme Court case which decided that benefits given by the military to the family of service members cannot be given out differently because of sex.

=== Officer Accession Programs ===
The Reserve Officer Training Corps (ROTC) was opened to women in 1972 and the first woman was commissioned from a ROTC program in 1974. The Women Officer School (WOS), Newport, RI, was disestablished in 1973, and Officer Candidate School (OCS) training was integrated to support men and women. The United States Naval Academy, along with the other Department of Defense military academies, first accepted women in 1976 and commissioned its first female graduates in 1980. Women also began attending Aviation Officer Candidate School (AOCS) in 1976.

=== Naval Nuclear Power Training ===
While still barred from serving on combatant vessels, enlisted women were accepted for training in the Naval Nuclear Power Program in the early 80s. After initial rating training, this consisted of Nuclear Power School (Orlando, FL), and the follow on Nuclear Power Training Unit (prototype) operational training (NY or ID). The first graduates of this training were in 1981. Because all nuclear powered vessels in the Navy at this time were combatants, these women were assigned to either prototype training billets or service/support roles on tenders and shore facilities. This caused some resentment among males in the enlisted nuclear power community because the women were viewed as taking away shore billets that would allow them to maintain a pay bonus based on their maintaining their proficiency in the nuclear power field. Training women in the nuclear power program was discontinued after a year or two because of this restriction on assigning them to combatant units.

=== Submarines ===
On 29 April 2010, the Department of the Navy announced authorization of a policy change allowing women to begin serving on board navy submarines. The new policy and plan was set to begin with the integration of female Officers. A group of up to 24 female Officers (three Officers on each of eight different crews) were scheduled to enter the standard nuclear submarine training pipeline in July 2010 – and expected to report to submarine duty by late 2011 or early 2012. Integration of Enlisted females into submarine crews was expected to begin soon thereafter. Initial candidates for female Submarine Officer positions were highly qualified selects from accession sources that include the Naval Academy, Naval Reserve Officers Training Corps, STA-21 program and Officer Candidate School, with transfers possible for those from other Unrestricted Line Officer communities. A group of up to eight female Supply Corps Officers was also expected to complete requisite training and begin submarine service in the same time frame.

Initial assignments for female submariners were on the blue and gold crews of selected guided-missile submarines (SSGNs) and ballistic-missile submarines (SSBNs). Two submarines of each type served as the inaugural vessels. The first group of U.S. female submariners completed nuclear power school and officially reported on board two ballistic and two guided missile submarines in November 2011. In 2012, it was announced that 2013 would be the first year for women to serve on U.S. attack submarines. On 22 June 2012, a sailor assigned to USS Ohio (SSGN-726) became the first female supply officer to qualify in U.S. submarines. Lt. Britta Christianson of Ohio's Gold Crew received her Submarine Supply Corps "dolphins" from the Gold Crew Commanding Officer Capt. Rodney Mills during a brief ceremony at Puget Sound Naval Shipyard and Intermediate Maintenance Facility (PSNS & IMF).

On 5 December 2012, three sailors assigned to USS Maine (SSBN-741) and USS Wyoming (SSBN-742) became the first female unrestricted line officers to qualify in U.S. submarines. LTJG Jennifer Noonan [ROTC Cornell University], a native of Scituate, Massachusetts, and LTJG Amber Cowan both of Maine's Blue Crew, and LTJG Marquette Leveque, a native of Fort Collins, Colorado., assigned to the Gold Crew of Wyoming, received their submarine "dolphins" during separate ceremonies at Naval Base Kitsap-Bangor, Washington. and Naval Submarine Base Kings Bay, Georgia. respectively. In 2013, Navy Secretary Ray Mabus said that the first women to join Virginia-class attack subs had been chosen: They were newly commissioned female officers scheduled to report to their subs in fiscal year 2015. In August 2016, Chief Petty Officer Dominique Saavedra became the first enlisted female sailor to earn her submarine qualification, and was assigned to USS Michigan (SSGN-727).

=== Surface Warfare ===
In 1972 the pilot program for assignment of officers and enlisted women to ships was initiated on board USS Sanctuary (AH-17). In 1978 Congress approved a change to Title 10 USC Section 6015 to permit the navy to assign women to fill sea duty billets on support and noncombatant ships. The Surface Warfare community opened to women. In 1979, the first woman obtained her Surface Warfare Officer (SWO) qualification. In 1993, Congress approved women to serve on combat ships. There were about 33 women who were the first assigned to these sea billets.

== Timeline of women in the United States Navy ==
Year	Event
1861-1865	Women worked as nurses for the navy during the American Civil War.
1908	The Navy Nurse Corps was established; it was all-female until 1965.
1917	Secretary of the Navy Josephus Daniels announced that the navy would enlist women on 17 March.
1917	Loretta Perfectus Walsh became the first woman to enlist in the navy on 17 March.
1942	President Franklin D. Roosevelt signed the Public Law 689 creating the navy's women reserve program (the WAVES) on 30 July 1942.
1942	Lieutenant Commander Mildred H. McAfee, USNR, director of the WAVES, became the navy's first female line officer.
1942	Navy Lieutenant, junior grade Ann A. Bernatitus became the first American recipient of the Legion of Merit. She was also the first person authorized to wear the "V" Device with the award.
1942	Susan Ahn Cuddy, a Korean-American, became the first Asian-American woman to join the Navy.
1944	Lieutenant Harriet Ida Pickens and Ensign Frances Wills were commissioned as the first African-American female navy officers.
1944	Sue Dauser, the director of the Navy Nurse Corps, became the first female captain in the navy.
1945	The first Black woman sworn into the Navy Nurse Corps was Phyllis Mae Dailey, a Columbia University student from New York, on 8 March 1945. She was the first of only four Black women to serve as a Navy nurse during World War II.
1945	Jane Kendeigh became the first Navy flight nurse in an active combat zone, serving at Iwo Jima.
1945	Mildred H. McAfee became the first woman to receive the Navy Distinguished Service Medal.
1948	The Women's Armed Services Integration Act (Pub. L. 80–625, 62 Stat. 356, enacted June 12, 1948) is a United States law that enabled women to serve as permanent, regular members of the armed forces, including the Navy. Prior to this act, women, with the exception of nurses, served in the military only in times of war. However, Section 502 of the act limited service of women by excluding them from aircraft and vessels of the Navy that might engage in combat.
1948	On 15 October 1948, the first eight women were commissioned in the regular Navy: Joy Bright Hancock, Winifred Quick Collins, Ann King, Frances Willoughby, Ellen Ford, Doris Cranmore, Doris Defenderfer, and Betty Rae Tennant took their oaths as naval officers.
1959	Yeoman Anna Der-Vartanian was the first woman in the navy promoted to master chief petty officer, and the first woman in the armed services promoted to E-9.
1961	Lieutenant Charlene I. Suneson became the first line WAVES officer to be ordered to shipboard duty.
1967	Public Law 90-130 was signed into law; it removed legal ceilings on women's promotions that had kept them out of the general and flag ranks, and dropped the two percent ceiling on officer and enlisted strengths for women in the armed forces.
1972	Roseanne Roberts became the first female helicopter plane captain in the Navy.
1972	Alene Duerk became the first female admiral in the navy.
1973	Frontiero v. Richardson, 411 U.S. 677 (1973), was a landmark Supreme Court case which decided that benefits given by the military to the family of service members cannot be given out differently because of sex.
1974	Lieutenant Junior Grade Barbara Ann (Allen) Rainey became the first navy woman to earn her wings on 22 February 1974.
1974	The first women were commissioned through NROTC.
1975	Schlesinger v. Ballard, 419 U.S. 498 (1975), was a United States Supreme Court case that upheld a federal statute granting female naval officers four more years of commissioned service before mandatory discharge than male Naval officers. A federal statute granted female Naval officers fourteen years of commissioned service while allowing only nine years of commissioned service for male Naval officers before mandatory discharge. The Supreme Court held that the law passed intermediate scrutiny equal protection analysis because women, excluded from combat duty, had fewer opportunities for advancement in the military. The Court found the statute to directly compensate for the past statutory barriers to advancement.
1976	Fran McKee became the navy's first female unrestricted line flag officer.
1978	Navy Nurse Joan C. Bynum became the first Black woman promoted to the rank of captain.
1978	Judge Sirica ruled the law banning navy women from ships to be unconstitutional in the US District Court for the District of Columbia case Owens v. Brown.
1978	Congress approved a change to Title 10 USC Section 6015 to permit the navy to assign women to fill sea duty billets on support and noncombatant ships.
1979	Lieutenant Lynn Spruill became the first female navy pilot qualified to land on aircraft carriers.
1979	The first woman in the navy to qualify as a surface warfare officer did so this year.
1980	The first women graduated from the United States Naval Academy. There were 81 women in the class of 1980 at the Naval Academy, and 55 of them graduated. Elizabeth Belzer was the first female graduate and Janie L. Mines was the first Black female graduate.
1984	Kristine Holderied became the first female valedictorian of the Naval Academy.
1990	Rear Admiral Marsha J. Evans became the first woman to command a Naval Station.
1990	Lieutenant Commander Darlene Iskra became the first navy woman to command a ship, USS Opportune (ARS-41).
1991	The Tailhook scandal occurred, in which Navy (and Marine Corps) aviators were accused of sexually assaulting 83 women (and 7 men) at the Tailhook convention in Las Vegas.
1993	Before the "Don't Ask Don't Tell" policy was enacted in 1993, lesbians and bisexual women (and gay men and bisexual men) were banned from serving in the military. In 1993 the "Don't Ask Don't Tell" policy was enacted, which mandated that the military could not ask servicemembers about their sexual orientation. However, until the "Don't Ask Don't Tell" policy was ended in 2011, service members (including but not limited to female service members) were still expelled from the military if they engaged in sexual conduct with a member of the same sex, stated that they were lesbian, gay, or bisexual, and/or married or attempted to marry someone of the same sex.
1994	On Nov. 15, 1994, Navy Lt. Kimberly “Face” Dyson became the first female pilot to fly an official combat mission for the American military.
1995	USS Benfold (DDG-65) was the first destroyer to be built to accommodate women.
1996	Patricia Tracey became the first female three-star officer (vice admiral) in the navy.
1998	CDR Maureen A. Farren became the first woman to command a combatant ship in the navy, USS Mount Vernon (LSD-39).
1998	Lillian Fishburne became the first African-American woman promoted to flag rank in the navy.
2003	Susan Livingstone served as the first female Acting United States Secretary of the Navy from January 24 to February 7 of 2003. Although this is a civilian position, it is included in this article because the Secretary of the Navy is the civilian leader of the Navy (and the Marine Corps).
2006	Carol M. Pottenger became the first woman to command an expeditionary strike group in the navy.
2009	The first pregnant midshipman graduated from the United States Naval Academy in 2009. While regulations expressly forbade this, the woman was able to receive a waiver from the United States Department of the Navy.
2010	Nora Tyson became the first woman to command a carrier strike group in the navy.
2010	Martha E.G. Herb became the first woman Navy deep sea diver and member of the EOD community to be promoted to flag rank in the Navy.
2011	The "Don't Ask Don't Tell" policy was ended in 2011, thus putting an end to service members (including but not limited to female service members) being expelled from the military if they engaged in sexual conduct with a member of the same sex, stated that they were lesbian, gay, or bisexual, and/or married or attempted to marry someone of the same sex.
2011	The first group of female submariners in the navy completed nuclear power school and officially reported on board two ballistic and two guided missile submarines in November 2011.
2012	Commander Monika Washington Stoker became the first African American woman to take command of a navy missile destroyer.
2012	Five "Tigertails" of Carrier Airborne Early Warning Squadron One Two Five (VAW-125), embarked aboard the Nimitz-class aircraft carrier USS Carl Vinson (CVN-70) as part of Carrier Air Wing Seventeen (CVW-17), flew an historic flight on 25 January when they participated in the navy's first all-female E-2C Hawkeye combat mission.
2012	On 22 June 2012, a sailor assigned to USS Ohio (SSGN-726) became the first female supply officer to qualify in submarines in the navy. Lt. Britta Christianson of Ohio's Gold Crew received her Submarine Supply Corps "dolphins" from the Gold Crew Commanding Officer Capt. Rodney Mills during a brief ceremony at Puget Sound Naval Shipyard and Intermediate Maintenance Facility (PSNS & IMF).
2012	On 5 December 2012, three sailors assigned to USS Maine (SSBN-741) and USS Wyoming (SSBN-742) became the first female unrestricted line officers to qualify in submarines in the navy. LTJG Marquette Leveque, a native of Fort Collins, Colorado, assigned to the Gold Crew of Wyoming, and LTJG Amber Cowan and LTJG Jennifer Noonan [ROTC Cornell University], a native of Scituate MA, both of Maine's Blue Crew received their submarine "dolphins" during separate ceremonies at Naval Submarine Base Kings Bay, Ga., and Naval Base Kitsap-Bangor, Wash.
2012	Robin Braun became the first female commander of the Navy Reserve, making her the first female three star aviator and the first woman to lead any Reserve component of the military.
2014	Michelle J. Howard became the first female four-star admiral in the navy.
2014	Jan E. Tighe became the first woman to command a numbered fleet when she assumed command of the navy's Tenth Fleet on 2 April 2014.
2014	In July 2014, Marine Corps Captain Katie Higgins became the first female pilot to join the Blue Angels, the navy's flight demonstration squadron. She piloted the team's KC-130 Hercules support aircraft, "Fat Albert."
2015	Nora Tyson was installed as the commander of the navy's Third Fleet, making her the first woman to lead a navy operational fleet.
2015	Cheryl Hansen became the first female commander of the Naval Construction Battalion Center in Gulfport, Mississippi.
2015	In December 2015, Defense Secretary Ash Carter stated that starting in 2016 all combat jobs would open to women.
2016	In March 2016, Defense Secretary Ash Carter approved final plans from military service branches and the U.S. Special Operations Command to open all combat jobs to women, and authorized the military to begin integrating female combat soldiers "right away."
2016	In August 2016, Dominique Saavedra became the first enlisted female sailor to earn her submarine qualification.
2019	In 2019, Capt. Tamara Lawrence, a spokeswoman for Naval Special Warfare, confirmed that an anonymous woman completed the SOAS Navy Seal screening, but was afterwards transferred to another section of the Navy as she had not listed the SEALs as her first choice of military branch to serve with. Lawrence also revealed that the woman who managed to complete the training was among five women who participated in the Navy SEAL SOAS training program as well and that this woman was awarded membership in the Navy branch of her choosing for completing the training.
2021	In July 2021, the first woman graduated from a Naval Special Warfare (NSW) assessment and selection pipeline to become a Special Warfare Combatant craft Crewman (SWCC). The SWCC directly supports the SEALs and other commando units, and are experts in covert insertion and extraction special operations tactics.
2023	In November 2023, Admiral Lisa Franchetti became the first female Chief of Naval Operations and, consequently, the first female member of the Joint Chiefs of Staff.
2023-2024	At some point in a deployment that lasted from October 2023 until July 14, 2024, a woman in the Navy's Strike Fighter Squadron 32 (VFA-32) became the first American female pilot to engage and kill an air-to-air contact.
2024	Yvette M. Davids began serving as the first female Superintendent of the United States Naval Academy on 11 January 2024.

== Careers ==
In the navy, women are currently eligible to serve in all ratings. In 2013 Leon Panetta removed the U.S. military's ban on women serving in combat, overturning a 1994 rule prohibiting women from being assigned to smaller ground combat units. Panetta's decision gave the U.S. military services until January 2016 to seek special exceptions if they believed any positions must remain closed to women. The services had until May 2013 to draw up a plan for opening all units to women and until the end of 2015 to actually implement it. In December 2015, Defense Secretary Ash Carter stated that starting in 2016 all combat jobs would open to women.

The former policy set by Congress and the Secretary of Defense, effective 1 October 1994, excluded women from direct ground combat billets in the military, stating:

"Service members who are eligible to be assigned to all positions for which they are qualified, except that women shall be excluded from assignment to units below the brigade level whose primary mission is to engage in direct combat on the ground as defined below. "Direct ground combat is engaging an enemy on the ground with individual or crew-served weapons, while being exposed to hostile fire and to a high probability of direct physical contact with the hostile force's personnel. Direct combat take place well forward on the battlefield while locating and closing with the enemy to defeat them by fire, maneuver, or shock effect." However, qualified and motivated women are encouraged to investigate the diver and explosive ordnance disposal (EOD) fields."

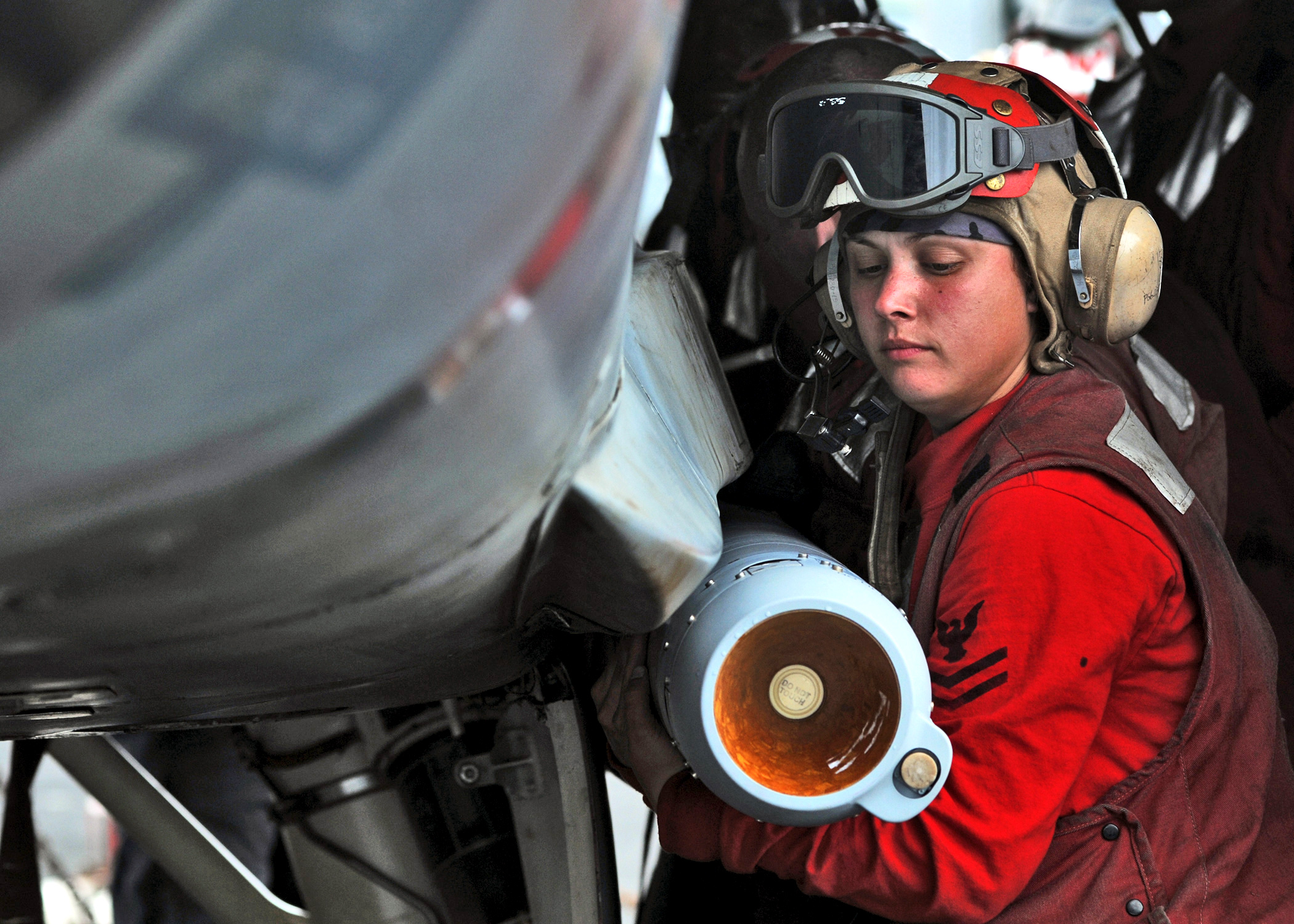
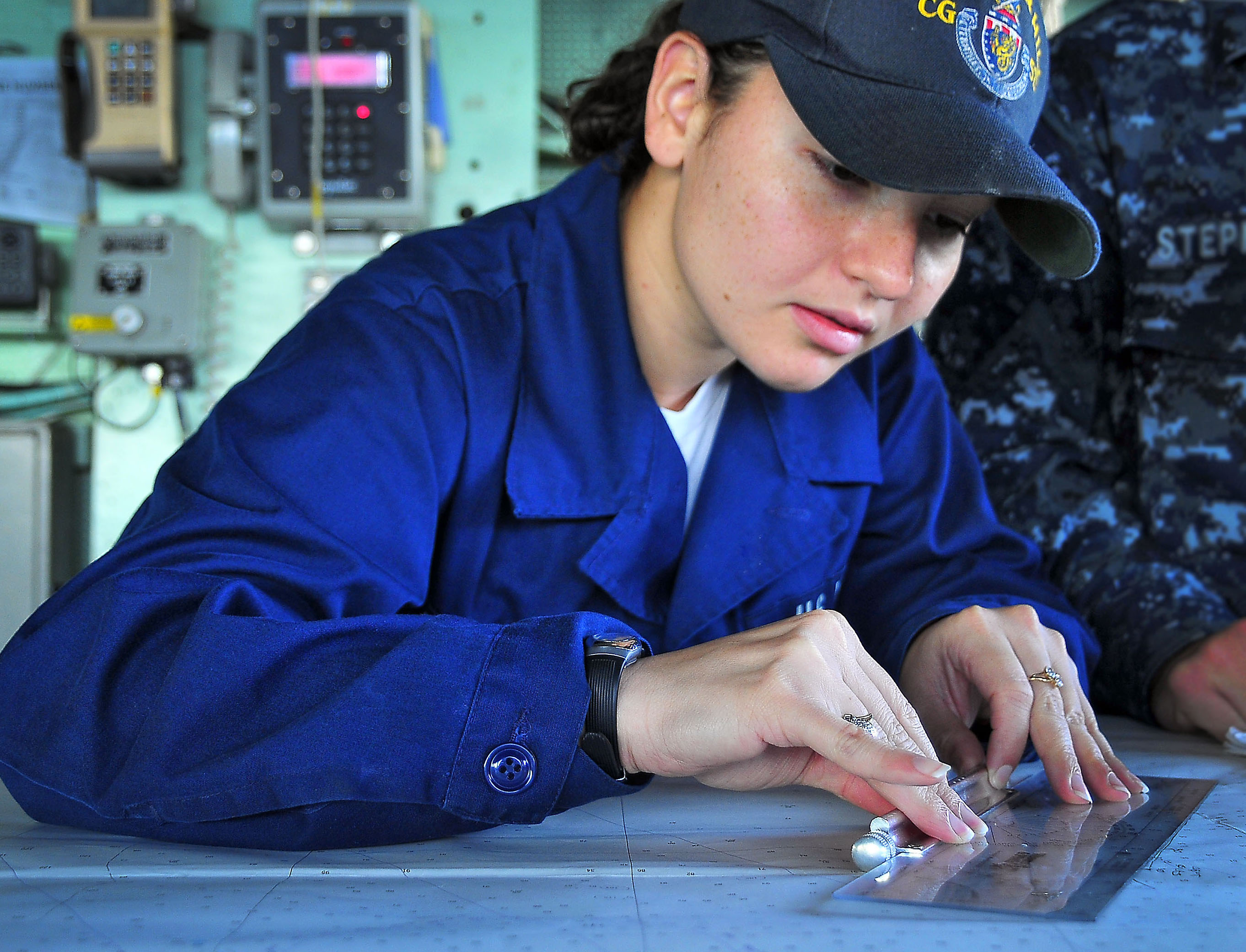
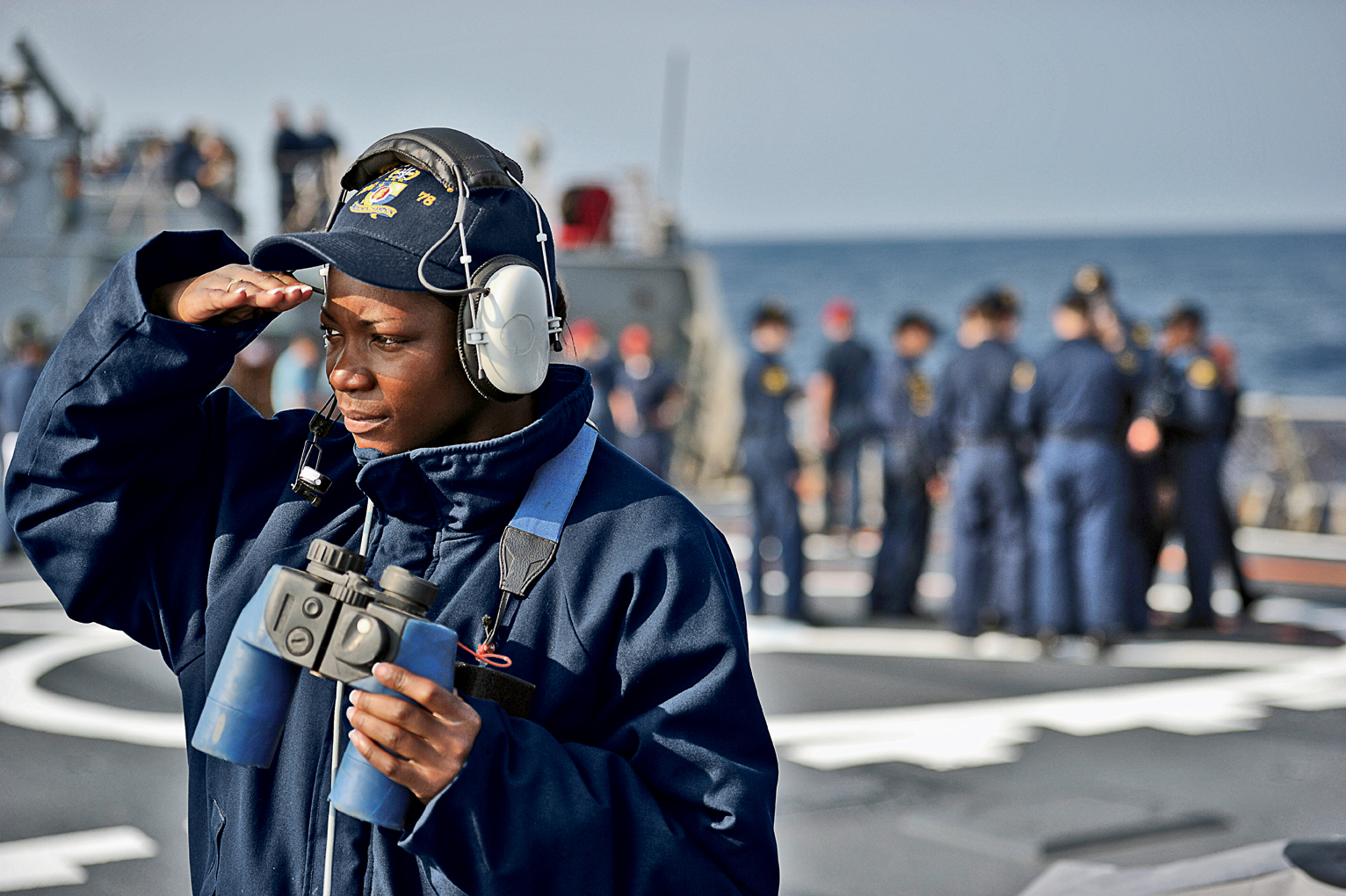
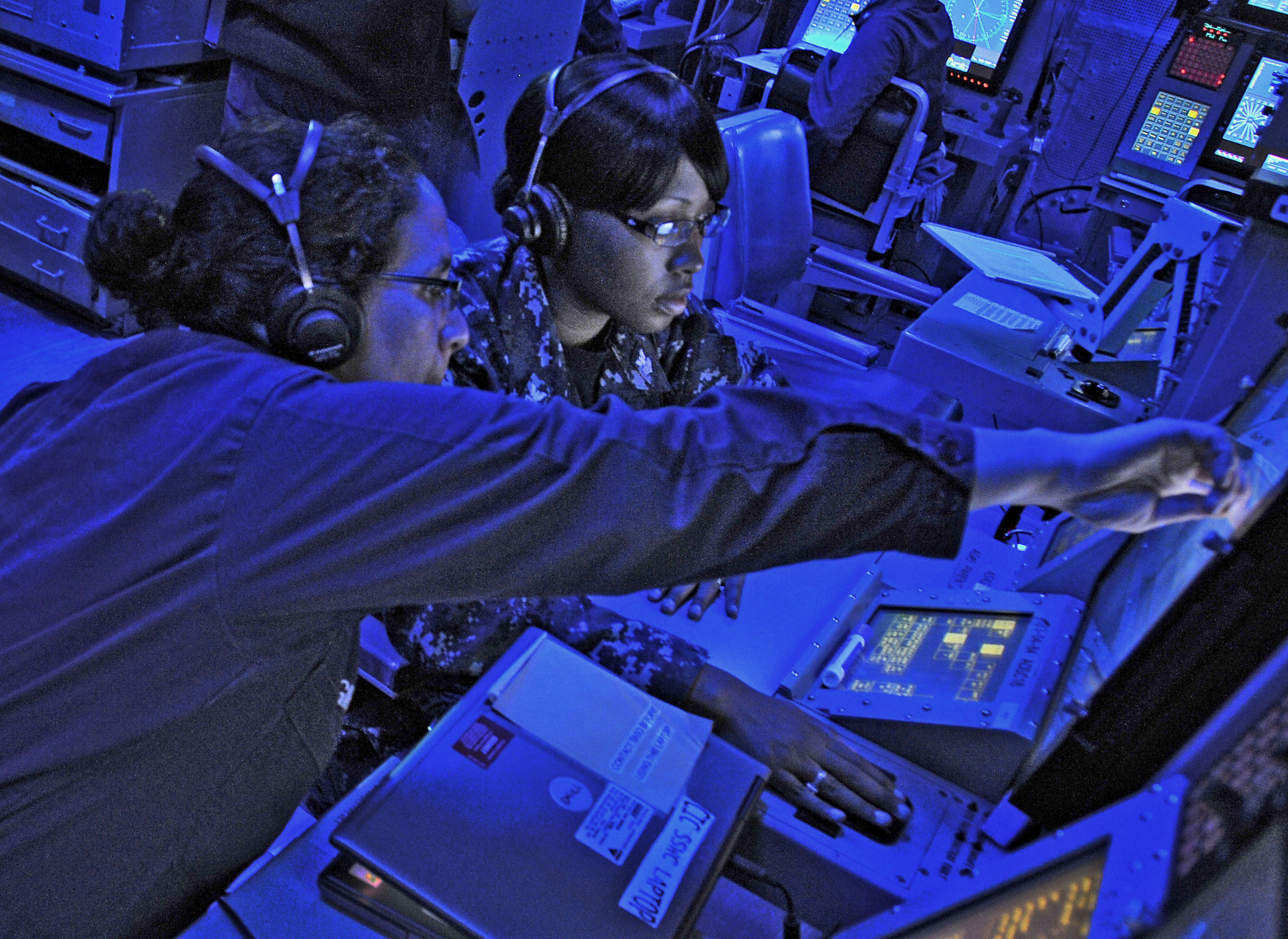
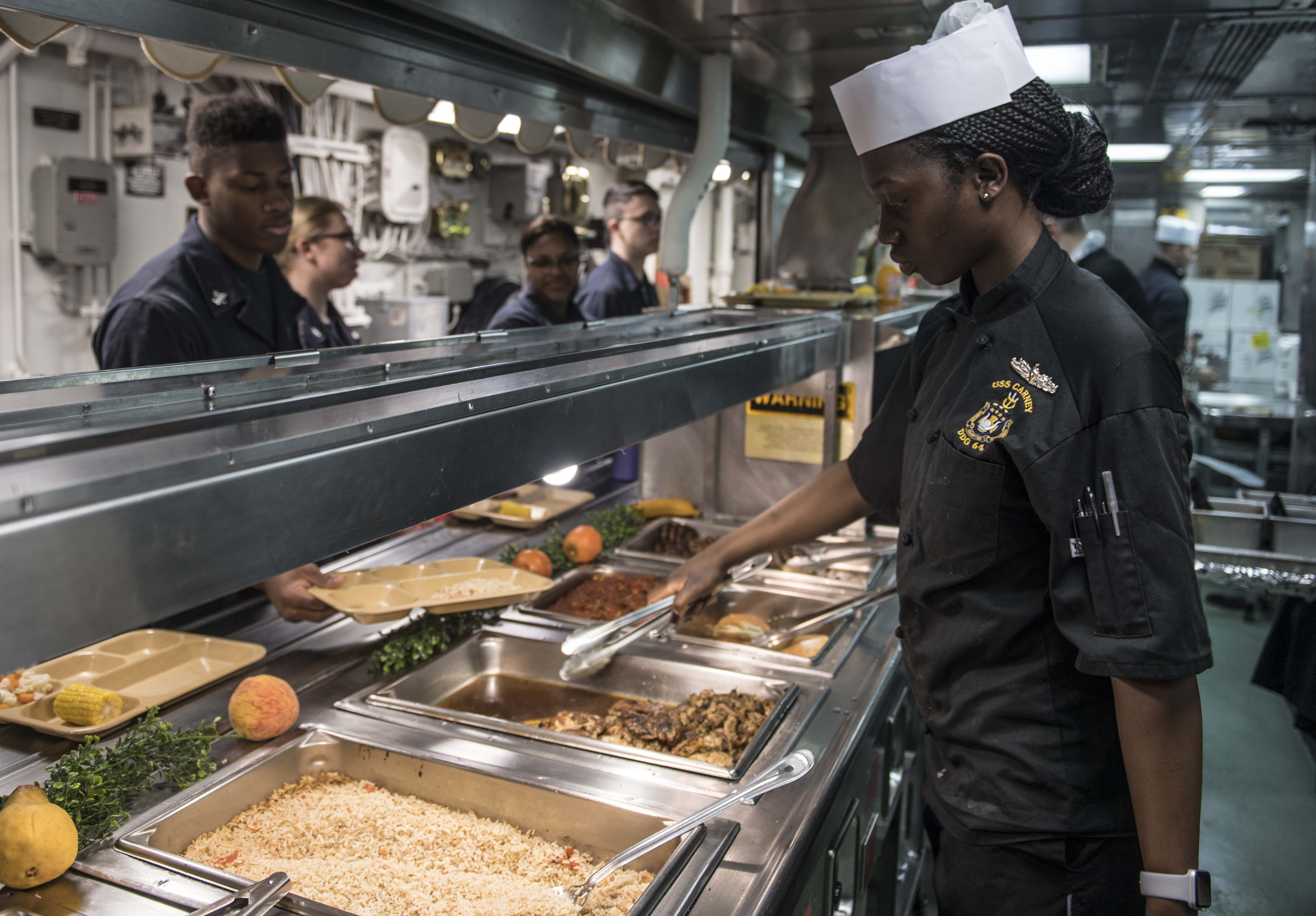
Careers in the navy

== Dress ==
- A certified maternity uniform is mandatory for all pregnant servicewomen in the navy when the regular uniform no longer fits.

== Grooming standards ==
- Hair: The navy deems that hairstyles shall not be "outrageously multicolored" or "faddish," to include shaved portions of the scalp (other than the neckline), or have designs cut or braided into the hair. Hair coloring must look natural and complement the individual. Haircuts and styles shall present a balanced appearance. Lopsided and extremely asymmetrical styles are not authorized. Pigtails, widely spaced individual hanging locks, and braids that protrude from the head, are not authorized. Multiple braids are authorized. Braided hairstyles shall be conservative and conform to the guidelines listed herein. When a hairstyle of multiple braids is worn, braids shall be of uniform dimension, small in diameter (approx. 1/4 inch), and tightly interwoven to present a neat, professional, well-groomed appearance. Foreign material (i.e., beads, decorative items) shall not be braided into the hair. Short hair may be braided in symmetrical fore and aft rows (cornrowing) that minimize scalp exposure. Cornrow ends shall not protrude from the head, and shall be secured only with inconspicuous rubber bands that match the color of the hair. Appropriateness of a hairstyle shall also be judged by its appearance when headgear is worn. All headgear shall fit snugly and comfortably around the largest part of the head without distortion or excessive gaps. Hair shall not show from under the front of the brim of the combination hat, garrison, or command ball caps. Hairstyles which do not allow headgear to be worn in this manner, or which interfere with the proper wear of protective masks or equipment are prohibited. When in uniform, the hair may touch, but not fall below a horizontal line level with the lower edge of the back of the collar. On 11 July 2018 Navy women became allowed to wear their hair in ponytails, locks, wider buns and at times below their collars, although subject to strict guidelines on the matter.
- Cosmetics: The navy prefers that cosmetics be applied in good taste so that colors blend with natural skin tone and enhance natural features. Exaggerated or faddish cosmetic styles are not authorized and shall not be worn. Care should be taken to avoid artificial appearance. Lipstick colors shall be conservative and complement the individual. Long false eyelashes shall not be worn when in uniform.
- Tattoos: Navy policy stipulates that any tattoo/body art/brand that is obscene, sexually explicit or advocates discrimination of any sort is prohibited. No tattoos/body art/brands on the head, face, neck, or scalp and individual tattoos/body art/brands exposed by wearing a short sleeve uniform shirt shall be no larger in size than the wearer's hand with fingers extended and joined with the thumb touching the base of the index finger.
- Jewelry: Conservative jewelry is authorized for all personnel and shall be in good taste while in uniform. Eccentricities or faddishness are not permitted. Jewelry shall not present a safety or FOD (Foreign object damage) hazard. Jewelry shall be worn within the following guidelines:

- Earrings: Earrings for women are an optional item, and are not required for wear. When worn the earring shall be a 4-6mm ball (gold for officers/CPOs, and silver for E-6 and below), plain with brushed, matte finish, screw-on or post type. Pearl earrings may be worn with Dinner Dress or Formal uniforms.
- Rings: While in uniform, only one ring per hand is authorized, plus a wedding/engagement ring set. Rings are not authorized for wear on thumbs.
- Necklaces: While in uniform, only one necklace may be worn and it shall not be visible.
- Bracelets: While in uniform, only one of each may be worn. Ankle bracelets are not authorized while in uniform.

- Fingernails: Fingernails for women shall not exceed 1/4 inch beyond the end of the finger. They shall be kept clean. Nail polish may be worn, but colors shall be conservative and complement the skin tone.

== Health and fitness standards ==
The Physical Fitness Assessment (PFA) is conducted twice a year for all sailors, which includes:

- Body Composition Assessment (BCA). Body composition is assessed by:

- An initial weight and height screening
- A Navy-approved circumference technique to estimate body fat percentage

Physical Readiness Test (PRT) include different standards for male and female sailors. PRT is a series of physical activities designed to evaluate factors that enable members to perform physically. Factors evaluated are:

- Muscular strength and endurance via:

1. Planks
2. Push-ups

- Aerobic capacity via:

1. 1.5-mile run/walk, or
2. 500-yard or 450-meter swim

PT Fitness Standards (NSW/NSO programs only):

- The PST consists of five events:
1. 500-yard swim (using sidestroke or breaststroke)
2. Push-Ups (as many as possible in 2-minutes)
3. Sit-Ups (as many as possible in 2-minutes)
4. Pull-Ups (as many as possible, no time limit)
5. 1 ½ mile run

== Navy family life ==
=== Benefits ===
Frontiero v. Richardson, 411 U.S. 677 (1973), was a landmark Supreme Court case which decided that benefits given by the military to the family of service members cannot be given out differently because of sex.

=== Marriage ===
Spouse co-location assignments are fully supported by the Chief of Naval Personnel and when requested become the main duty preference and are accommodated consistent with the needs of the navy. While not always possible, they are considered a priority and effort is made, within reason, to allow military couples and family members to move and serve together. Co-op assignments are not guaranteed.

The service member requesting transfer to join with his/her spouse or family member must have a minimum of one year on board his/her present command at the time of transfer.

Military couples may not be permanently assigned to the same ship or the same shipboard deployable command. For shore assignments, the couple will not be assigned to the same reporting station without the gaining CO's approval. Unusual circumstances may require a couple being temporarily assigned to the same afloat activity, which is allowable at the CO's discretion.

== Controversies ==
=== Transgender people ===
According to scholars, since at least as early as 1960, Executive Order 10450 was applied to ban transgender individuals from serving in the United States military. On May 17, 1963, gender transitioned or transitioning individuals were officially prohibited from the United States military by Army Regulation 40-501. This policy reasoned transgender people were medically unqualified to serve because their mental state was considered unfit. Later, after varying restrictions over the years, there stopped being restrictions on people serving in the military due to their being transgender when President Joe Biden signed the "Executive Order on Enabling All Qualified Americans to Serve Their Country in Uniform" on January 25, 2021. However, Executive Order 14183, titled "Prioritizing Military Excellence and Readiness", an executive order issued by President Donald Trump on January 27, 2025, again banned transgender people from military service. In March 2025, a federal judge blocked the Executive Order; but in May of that year the Supreme Court allowed the Trump administration to reinstate the ban while legal challenges continue in the Ninth Circuit.

=== Pregnancy ===
In her 1995 book Tailspin: Women at War in the Wake of Tailhook, Jean Zimmerman reported that there was a perception in the navy that women sailors use pregnancy to escape or avoid deployed ship duty. In an example cited by Zimmerman, in 1993 as the USS Cape Cod prepared to depart on a deployment cruise, 25 female sailors, out of a crew of 1,500, reported being pregnant shortly before the scheduled departure and were reassigned to shore duty. Although Zimmerman felt that the number of pregnancies was small and should not be regarded as significant, the senior enlisted sailor on the ship, Command Master Chief Alice Smith rejoined, "Just about every division has been decimated by the number of pregnancies. Now tell me that's not going to hurt a ship." A 1997 study by the Navy Personnel Research and Development Center found that female sailors assigned to ships experienced higher pregnancy and abortion rates than shore-based female sailors.

A Navy policy change in June 2007 extended post-partum tours of duty ashore from 4 months to 12 months. A Virginia Pilot article in October 2007 reported on the navy's policy decision as a means to improve long term retention of trained personnel. The chief of women's policy for the chief of personnel noted that far more men than women fail to deploy or are sent back from deployment, "because of sports injuries, discipline issues or testing positive for drugs."

In 2009, Andrew Tilghman reported in the Military Times on a Naval Inspector General (IG) report noting that, in the wake of this change, Navy shore commands based in Norfolk reported that 34% of their assigned members were pregnant sailors reassigned from ship duty. Since shore-based assignments for pregnant sailors were extended in 2007, the number of navy women leaving deploying units to have children rose from 1,770 in June 2006 to 3,125 as of 1 August 2009. Tilghman further reports that Navy Personnel Command is reviewing the report.

=== Sexual orientation ===
Before the "Don't Ask Don't Tell" policy was enacted in 1993, lesbians and bisexual women (and gay men and bisexual men) were banned from serving in the military. In 1993 the "Don't Ask Don't Tell" policy was enacted, which mandated that the military could not ask servicemembers about their sexual orientation. However, until the policy was ended in 2011 service members were still expelled from the military if they engaged in sexual conduct with a member of the same sex, stated that they were lesbian, gay, or bisexual, and/or married or attempted to marry someone of the same sex.

=== Women on submarines ===
In July 1994, policy changes were made expanding the number of assignments available to women in the navy. At this time, repeal of the combat exclusion law gave women the opportunity to serve on surface combatant ships but still excluded assignments for women to serve on board submarines. Previously there had been concern about bringing women onto submarines because living quarters offered little privacy and weren't considered suitable for mixed-gender habitation.

In October 2009, the Secretary of the Navy announced that he and the Chief of Naval Operations were moving aggressively to change the policy. Reasons included the fact that larger SSGN and SSBN submarines now in the Fleet had more available space and could accommodate female Officers with little or no modification. Also, the availability of qualified female candidates with the desire to serve in this capacity was cited. It was noted that women now represented 15% of the Active Duty Navy and that women today earn about half of all science and engineering bachelor's degrees. A policy change was deemed to serve the aspirations of women, the mission of the navy and the strength of its submarine force.

In February 2010, the Secretary of Defense approved the proposed policy and signed letters formally notifying Congress of the intended change. After receiving no objection, the Department of the Navy officially announced on 29 April 2010, that it had authorized women to serve on board submarines moving forward.

The first group of U.S. female submariners completed nuclear power school and officially reported on board two ballistic and two guided missile submarines in November 2011.

In 2024, USS New Jersey (SSN-796), the first submarine designed for the complete integration of female and male sailors, was commissioned into the Navy's Submarine Force.

== Admirals ==
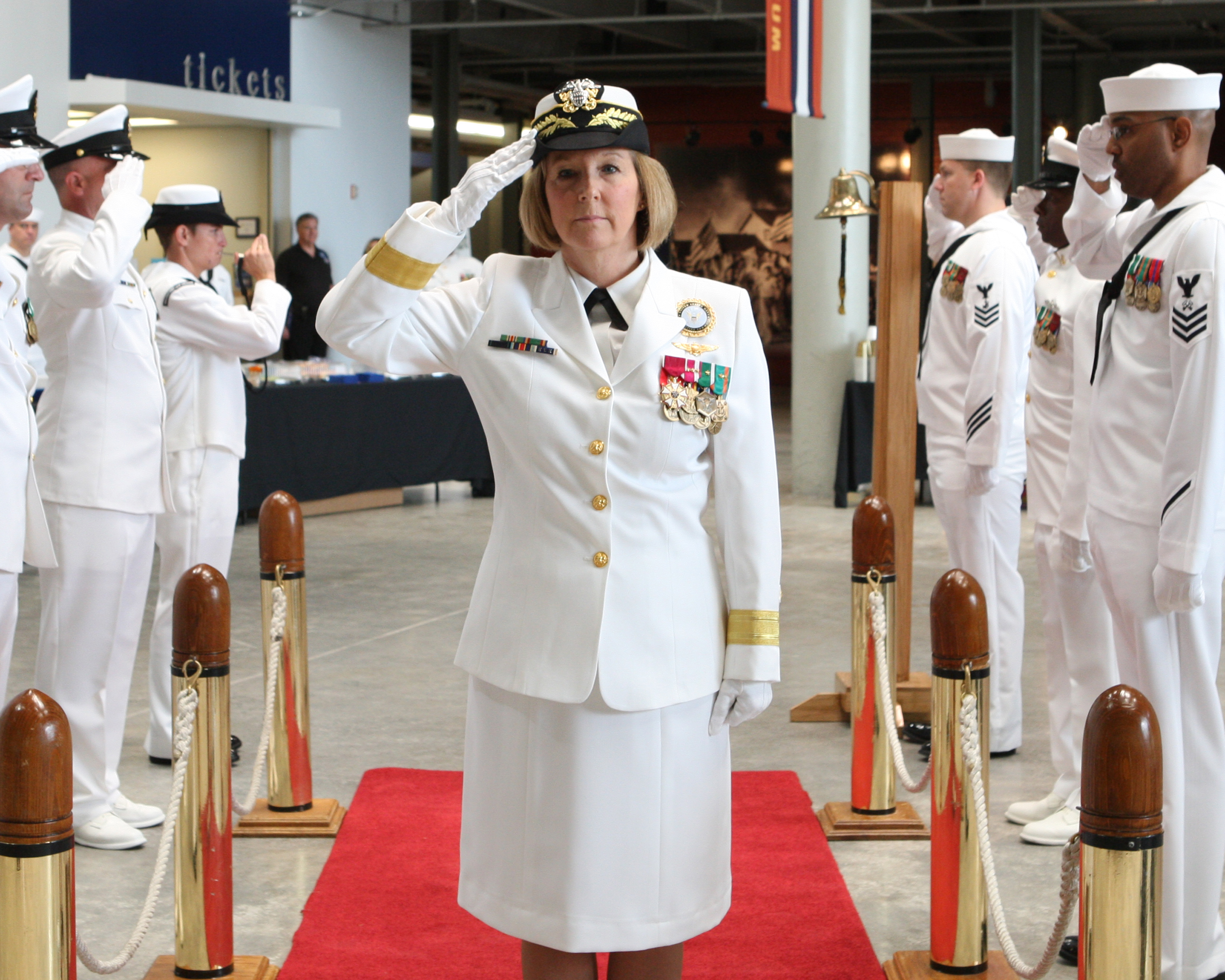
U.S. Navy Rear Adm. Robin Braun, Commander, Navy Recruiting Command.

Alene Duerk became the first female admiral in the navy in 1972. Michelle J. Howard became the first female four-star admiral in the navy in 2014.

Name	Commission	Position	Community	RDML	RADM	VADM	ADM	Retired	Notes
Michelle J. Howard	1982 (USNA)	Vice Chief of Naval Operations	Surface Warfare	2006	2010	2012	2014	2017	First woman to earn fourth star in the US Navy.
Patricia A. Tracey	1970	Director, Navy Staff, N09B, Office of the Chief of Naval Operations	URL	?	?	1996		2004	First woman to earn third star in the US Navy.
Ann E. Rondeau	1974 (OCS)	President, National Defense University	Fleet Support	1999	2002	2005		2012	
Nancy Elizabeth Brown	1974 (OCS)	Director for C4 Systems (J6)	URL	2000	2003	2006		2009	
Carol M. Pottenger	1977 (NROTC)	Deputy Chief of Staff for Capability and Development, Supreme Allied Commander Transformation	Surface Warfare	2003	2007	2010		2013	
Nanette M. DeRenzi	1984 (OIS)	Judge Advocate General of the Navy	JAG	2009	2009	2012		2015	
Robin Braun	1980	Chief of Navy Reserve/Commander, Navy Reserve Force	Reserve, Naval Aviator	2007	2011	2012		2016	
Nora W. Tyson	1979 (OCS)	Commander, US Third Fleet	Naval Flight Officer	2007	2011	2013		2017	First woman to command a carrier strike group.
Jan E. Tighe	1984 (USNA)	Commander, U.S. Fleet Cyber Command, Commander U. S. 10th Fleet	IDW/Crypto	2010	2013	2014		2018	First female IDW flag officer. First woman to command a numbered fleet.
Nancy A. Norton	1987 (OCS)	Commander, Joint Forces Headquarters - Department of Defense Information Network (JFHQ-DODIN); Director of the Defense Information Agency (DISA)	IDW	2013	2016	2018		2021	
Fran McKee	1950	Assistant Chief of Naval Personnel for Human Resource Management	URL	1976	1978			1981	First woman line officer promoted to flag rank in the United States Navy. Second woman promoted to flag rank in the United States Navy
Roberta L. Hazard	1960	Assistant Chief of Naval Personnel, Personnel Readiness and Community Support 1989–1992	URL	1984	1989			1992	First woman to command a navy training command (NTC San Diego 1982).
Marsha J. Evans	1967	Superintendent of the Naval Postgraduate School 1995–1998	Fleet Support	1992	1996			1998	
Joan Marie Engel	1969	18th Director, Navy Nurse Corps 1994–1998	SHCE (Nurse Corps)	1994	1997			2000	18th Director, Navy Nurse Corps.
Barbara E. McGann	1970 (OCS)	Provost, Naval War College 2000–2002	URL	1994	1998			2002	
Ronne Froman	1970	Director, Ashore Readiness, Chief of Naval Operations, Washington, D.c. 2000 – 2001	Fleet Support	1995	1999			2001	First woman commander of Navy Region Southwest (aka "Navy Mayor of San Diego"), 1997–2000.
Bonnie Burnham Potter	1975 (OIS)	Fleet Surgeon, U.S. Atlantic Fleet 1999–	Medical Corps	1997	2000			2003	First female physician to become a flag officer in the military.
Kathleen Paige	1971	Program Director, Aegis Ballistic Missile Defense 2003–2005	Engineering Duty Officer	1996	2001			2005	
Karen A. Harmeyer	1975	Chief of Staff, Chief of Naval Operations, N093R, Washington, D.C.	SHCE (Nurse Corps)	1997	2001			2002	1st female two-star in the Reserves.
Kathleen L. Martin	1973 (OIS)	Deputy Surgeon General of the Navy/ Vice Chief, Bureau of Medicine and Surgery 2002–2005	SHCE (Nurse Corps)	1998	2001			2005	19th Director of the Navy Nurse Corps from August 1998 to August 2001. First Nurse Corps officer to be assigned to the position of Deputy Surgeon General of the Navy.
Annette E. Brown	1974 (OCS)	Commander, Navy Region Southeast (2002)	Fleet Support	1999	2003			2005	
Linda J. Bird	1974 (OCS)	Director, Supply, Ordnance and Logistics Operations Division, N41 2003–2005	Supply Corps	1999	2002			2005	
Elizabeth M. Morris	1973 (OIS)	Deputy Chief for Reserve Affairs at the Bureau of Medicine and Surgery 2005–2006?	SHCE (Nurse Corps)	2001	2004			2006	
Nancy J. Lescavage	1972 (OIS)	Senior Health Care Executive Regional Director, TRICARE Regional Office – West	SHCE (Nurse Corps)	2003	2005			2009	20th Director of the Navy Nurse Corps.
Donna L. Crisp	1974 (OCS)	Commander, Joint POW/MIA Accounting Command	URL	2001	2006			2010	
Ann D. Gilbride	1978 (OCS)	Director, National Maritime Intelligence Center	Reserve	2003	2006			2009	
Sharon H. Redpath	1976 (NROTC)	Vice Commander, Navy Expeditionary Combat Command, Commander, Navy Expeditionary Logistics Support Group	Reserve	2003	2006			2009	
Elizabeth A. Hight	1977 (OCS)	Vice Director, Defense Information Systems Agency	URL	2003	2006			2010	First woman to Command the JTF-GNO, after serving as its Deputy Commander. First woman Vice Director at DISA.
Christine Bruzek-Kohler	1974	Commander, Navy Medicine West, Naval Medical Center San Diego	Nurse Corps	2004	2007			2010	21st Director of the Navy Nurse Corps.
Christine S. Hunter	1980	deputy director, TRICARE Management Activity	Medical	2004	2007			2011	
Wendi B. Carpenter	1977 (AOCS)	Commander, Navy Warfare Development Command, Norfolk	Reserve	2004	2008			2011	First female naval aviator promoted to Flag rank.
Karen Flaherty	1973 (OIS)	Deputy Surgeon General of Navy Medicine	Nurse Corps	2003	2008			2012	22nd Director of the Navy Nurse Corps.
Moira N. Flanders	1978 (OCS)	Director, Inter-American Defense College	URL	2005	2008			2012	
Kathleen M. Dussault	1979 (OCS)	Director, Supply, Ordnance and Logistics Operations Division (OPNAV N41)	Supply Corps	2006	2009			2012	
Janice M. Hamby	1980 (NROTC)	Vice Director for C4 Systems (J6)	URL, then Information Professional	2006	2009			2012	
Elizabeth S. Niemyer	1981	Director, Navy Nurse Corps	Nurse Corps	2008	2010			2013	23rd Director of the Navy Nurse Corps
Patricia E. Wolfe	1981 (NROTC)	Commander, Navy Expeditionary Logistics Support Group (NAVELSG)	Reserve, Supply Corps	2007	2010			2013	
Cynthia A. Covellhttps://www.navy.mil/Leadership/Flag-Officer-Biographies/BioDisplay/Article/2350568/rear-admiral-cynthia-covell/	1980 (OCS)	Commander, Navy Personnel Command	Navy Human Resources Officer	2008	2012			2014	
Margaret D. Klein	1981 (USNA)	Senior Advisor to the Secretary of Defense for Military Professionalism	Naval Flight Officer	2008	2012			2017	82nd Commandant of Midshipmen, USNA – first woman.
Sandy Daniels	1980 (USNA)	Senior Advisor for Space to the Deputy Chief of Naval Operations for Information Dominance (OPNAV N2/N6)	Reserve	2007	2012			2015	
Katherine L. Gregory	1982 (USNA)	Commander, Naval Facilities Engineering Command, Chief of Civil Engineers	CEC	2010	2013			2015	First female CEC admiral.
Elizabeth L. Train	1983 (OCS)	Director, National Maritime Intelligence-Integration Office, Commander, Office of Naval Intelligence	Intelligence	2009	2013			2016	
Paula C. Brown	1982	Deputy Commander, Naval Facilities Engineering Command, Deputy Chief of Civil Engineers	CEC	2010	2013			2016	
Elaine C. Wagner	1984	Deputy Chief, Bureau of Medicine and Surgery, Wounded, Ill and Injured	Dental Corps	2010	2013			2017	Chief of the Naval Dental Corps, 2010 – 2017
Althea Coetzee	1985 (USNA)	Deputy Director, Contingency Contracting, Defense Procurement and Acquisition Policy (DPAP), OSD (Acquisition Technology & Logistics)	Supply Corps	2011	2014			2017	
Janet R. Donovan	1983	Deputy Judge Advocate General (Reserve Affairs & OPS)	JAG	2012	2014			2016	
Martha E. G. Herb	1979 (OCS)	Director Inter-American Defense College	EOD	2010	2014			2018	
Valerie K. Huegel	1980 (OCS)	Commander, Navy Expeditionary Logistics Support Group	Supply Corps	2011	2014			2017	
Rebecca J. McCormick-Boyle	1981	Chief of Staff, Bureau of Medicine and Surgery	Nurse Corps	2011	2014			2018	
Margaret G. Kibben	1986 (OIS)	Chaplain of the United States Marine Corps, deputy chief of Navy Chaplains	Chaplain Corps	2010	2014			2018	18th Chaplain of the USMC, first female chaplain at USNA.
Alene B. Duerk	1943	Director Navy Nurse Corps 1970–1975	Nurse Corps	1972				1975	First female admiral in the United States Navy. Director Navy Nurse Corps 1970–1975.
Maxine Conder	1951	Director, Navy Nurse Corps 1975–1979	Nurse Corps	1975				1979	Director, Navy Nurse Corps.
Frances Shea-Buckley	1951	14th Director, Navy Nurse Corps 1979–1983	Nurse Corps	1979				1983	14th Director, Navy Nurse Corps.
Pauline Hartington	1953	Commander, Naval Training Center Orlando	URL	1981				1984	Second woman line officer selected for flag rank.
Grace Hopper	1944	Head, Training and Technology Directorate/Special Advisor to the Commander, Naval Data Automation Command	URL?	1983				1986	Co-inventor of COBOL. Arleigh Burke-class guided missile destroyer USS Hopper (DDG-70) named for RDML Hopper.
Mary Joan Nielubowicz	1951	15th Director, Navy Nurse Corps 1983–1987	Nurse Corps	1983				1987	15th Director, Navy Nurse Corps.
Mary F. Hall	1959	16th Director, Navy Nurse Corps 1987–1991	Nurse Corps	1987				1991	Director, Navy Nurse Corps.
Louise C. Wilmot	1964	Commander, Naval Base Philadelphia −1994	URL	1991				1994	First woman to command a naval base.
Mariann Stratton	1966	17th Director, Navy Nurse Corps 1991–1994	Nurse Corps	1991				1994	17th Director, Navy Nurse Corps.
Maryanne T. Gallagher Ibach	1964		Reserve Nurse Corps	1990				1995	First Reserve flag officer for Navy Nurse Corps.
Katharine L. Laughton	1963	Commander, Naval Space Command, Dahlgren, VA 1995–1997	Fleet Support	1993				1997	
Nancy A. Fackler	1962	Deputy Director of the Navy Nurse Corps for Reserve Affairs	Reserve Nurse Corps	1994				1997	
Jacqueline O. (Allison) Barnes		Director, On-Site Inspection Directorate 1998–2000	Fleet Support	1996				2000	
Lillian E. Fishburne	1973 (OCS)	Director, Information Transfer Division for the Space, Information Warfare, Command and Control Directorate ?-2001	URL	1998				2001	First African-American woman to achieve flag rank.
Marianne B. Drew	1967	Deputy Commander, Navy Personnel Command	Reserve, Fleet Support	1999				2002	
Eleanor Mariano	1977	White House Physician	Medical Corps	2000				2001	First Filipino-American flag officer.
Rosanne M. Levitre	1973 (OCS)	Director of Intelligence, J2, U.S. Joint Forces Command	Intelligence	2000				2005	First Director, Navy Intelligence, Surveillance, and Reconnaissance (ISR), FORCEnet. First female Intel officer selected for flag rank in the United States Navy.
Carol I. Turner	1977	Senior Health Care Executive, U.S. Navy Commander, Navy Medicine Support Command	Dental Corps	2005				2008	First female Chief of the Naval Dental Corps, 2003–2007.
Deborah Loewer	1976 (OCS)	Commander, Mine Warfare Command 2005–2006	Surface Warfare	2003				2007	First warfare-qualified woman selected for flag rank in the United States Navy.
Cynthia A. Dullea	1980 (OIS)	Deputy Commander, Navy Medicine National Capital Area	Reserve	2007				2014	
Cynthia A. Covell	1980 (OCS)								
Maude Elizabeth Young	1984 (USNA)	Director, Systems Engineering National Reconnaissance Office; Commander, SPAWAR Space Field Activity (SSFA), PEO for Space Systems, USN	URL	2008				2011	
Eleanor V. Valentin	1982	Director, Medical Service Corps, Commander, Navy Medicine Support Command, Jacksonville, Florida	MSC	2009				2014	16th director of the Medical Service Corps (first female director)
Robin L. Graf	1981 (OCS)	Deputy Commander, Navy Recruiting Command	URL	2009				2016	
Diane E. H. Webber	1983 (OCS)	Commander, Navy Cyber Forces	IP	2009				2015	
Ann Claire Phillips	1983 (NROTC)	Commander, Expeditionary Strike Group Two	Surface Warfare	2010				2014	
Gretchen S. Herbert	1984 (NROTC)	Assistant Chief of Naval Operations, Next Generation Enterprise Network (NGEN)	URL	2010				2014	
Margaret A. Rykowski	1987	Fleet Surgeon, Third Fleet	NNC	2010				2013	
Sandra E. Adams	1981 (OCS)	Deputy Commander, Naval Expeditionary Combat Command	URL (SWO)	2011				2015	
Annie B. Andrews	1983 (NROTC)	Commander, Navy Recruiting Command	Navy Human Resources Officer	2012				2015	
Cindy Jaynes	1983 (OCS)	Program Executive Officer for Air ASW, Assault & Special Mission Programs, PEO(A)	AMDO	2012				2016	
Christina M. Alvarado	1988	Deputy Commander, Navy Medicine East	Nurse Corps	2013	2015			2018	
Babette Bolivar	1985 (USNA)	Commander, Navy Region Southwest	EOD/ Diving & Salvage	2013				2021	
Priscilla B. Coe		Deputy Chief of Staff, Bureau of Medicine and Surgery, Deputy Chief, Navy Reserve Dental Corps	Dental Corps	2013				2016	
Lisa Franchetti	1985 (NROTC)	Chief of Naval Operations	SWO	2013		2018	2022		First women to become CNO
Alma M. Grocki	1981 (USNA)	Deputy Chief of Staff for Fleet Maintenance, Commander, U.S. Pacific Fleet	Reserve EDO	2013				2016	
Deborah P. Haven		Commander, Defense Contract Management Agency International	Reserve Supply Corps	2013	2016			2019	
Barbara Sweredoski	1985 (NROTC)	Reserve Deputy, Military Personnel Plans & Policy N13R	HR	2012				2015	
Cynthia Thebaud	1985 (USNA)	Commander, Logistics Group Western Pacific, Commander, Task Force 73, Singapore Area Coordinator	SWO	2013				2016	
Dawn E. Cutler	1989 (NROTC)	Chief of Information (CHINFO)	PAO	2014				2017	
Danelle Barrett	1989 (NROTC)	Cyber Security Division Director/Deputy Department of the Navy Chief Information Officer	IDWO	2015				2019	
Kelly Aeschbach	(NROTC)	Commander, U.S. Naval Information Forces	Intelligence	2016	2019	2021			
Linda Wackerman	1986	First female C9 Squadron CO, VR52; Commander of NEPLO Program; Deputy Director OPNAV N81; Deputy Commander Navy IG; Deputy Commander USNAVSO and US FOURTH Fleet	Naval Aviator	2014				2018	Pilot for American Airlines
Raquel C. Bono	1979	Director, Defense Health Agency	Medical Corps	2011	2014	2015		2019	
Tina A. Davidson	1986	Commander, Navy Medicine Education, Training and Logistics Command	Nurse Corps	2016				2020	
Mary M. Jackson	1988 (USNA)	Commander, Navy Installations Command	SWO	2014	2017	2017		2020	Promoted directly from one-star to three-star.
Nancy S. Lacore	1990 (NROTC)	Director of the Maritime Partnership Program, U.S. Naval Forces Europe/Africa/U.S. 6th Fleet	Aviator	2018					
Shoshana S. Chatfield	1988 (NROTC)	President, Naval War College	Aviator	2015	2018				
Kathleen Creighton	1988 (NROTC)	Director of Warfare Integration	IP	2014	2018				
Yvette M. Davids	1989 (USNA)	Chief of Staff, United States Southern Command	SWO	2017	2020				
Sara A. Joyner	1989 (USNA)	Chief of Legislative Affairs, United States Navy	Naval Aviator	2017	2021	2022			

== See also ==
- Timeline of women in warfare in Colonial America
- Timeline of women in warfare in the United States before 1900
- Timeline of women in warfare in the United States from 1900 to 1949
- Timeline of women in warfare in the United States from 1950 to 1999
- Timeline of women in warfare in the United States since 2000
- United States Navy Nurse Corps
- United States Marine Corps Women's Reserve
- WAVES
- United States Navy SEALs#Women
- United States Armed Forces#Women

== Bibliographies ==
- Women in the Navy, a bibliography compiled in 1998 by Diana Simpson, Bibliographer, Air University Library, Maxwell AFB.
- Women in the U.S. Navy: Bibliography and Sources from the Naval Historical Center.
- 30 Years of Women at USNA, selected bibliography of resources available in the Naval Academy's Nimitz Library.
- Bibliography on women in the military from the Women in Military Service for America (WIMSA) Memorial
