= Dictionary of American Naval Fighting Ships =

Reference work for US Navy vessels

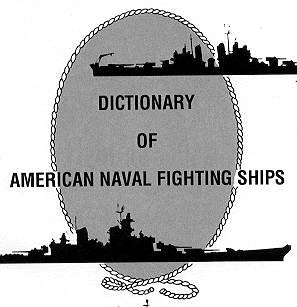
- Author: James Longuemare Mooney
- Publisher: Navy Dept., Office of the Chief of Naval Operations, Naval History Division
- Publication date: 1959–1991
- OCLC: 2794587

The Dictionary of American Naval Fighting Ships (DANFS) is the official reference work for the basic facts about ships used by the United States Navy.

When the writing project was developed the parameters for this series were designed to cover only commissioned US Navy ships with assigned names. If the ship was not assigned a name it was not included in the histories written for the series. In addition to the ship entries, DANFS and the online links have been expanded to include appendices on small craft, histories of Confederate Navy ships, and various essays related to naval ships.

== Forewords and introductions ==
Foreword and introduction passages for many editions were written by major figures from naval command history from Arleigh Albert Burke to Elmo Russell Zumwalt Jr. and others.

== Authors ==
- Richard P. Slaymaker (vol. I 1959)
- John P. Sullivan (USN) (vol. I 1959)
- Walter P. Smiley (vol. I 1959)
- Esther Handelman Vail (vol. II 1963)
- Alma R. Lawrence (vol. II 1963)
- Roberta L. Hazard (vol. II 1963)
- Jesse B. Thomas (vol. II 1963)
- Clayton F. Johnson (vol. III 1968)
- John C. Roberts (vol. III 1968)
- Raymond J. Iwanowski (vol. III 1968)
- James V. Stewart (vol. III 1968, vol. IV 1969)
- Joan A. Schrader (vol. III 1968)
- John C. Reilley, Jr. (vol. III 1968, vol. VI 1976, vol. VII 1981, vol. VIII 1981)
- James L. Mooney (vol. IV 1969, vol. V 1976, vol. VI 1976, vol. VII 1981, vol. VIII 1981, vol. I-A 1991)
- Mary F. Loughlin (vol. IV 1969, vol. V 1976, vol. VI 1976)
- Joan A. Schrader (vol. IV 1969)
- Samuel Loring Morison (vol. IV 1969, vol. V 1976, vol. VI 1976)
- Robert J. Devlin (vol. IV 1969, vol. V 1976)
- Frank Suran (vol. IV 1969)
- Priscilla Sorenson (vol. IV 1969)
- Everett Gordon Bowen-Hassell (vol. V 1976)
- John M. Patton (vol. V 1976)
- Raymond A. Mann (vol. VI 1976, vol. VII 1981, vol. VIII 1981)
- Roland S. Kennerly (vol. VI 1976, vol. VII 1981, vol. VIII 1981)
- Christopher Townsend (vol. VI 1976)
- Robert J. Cressman (vol. VII 1981, vol. VIII 1981)
- Christopher N. Kennedy (vol. VII 1981, vol. VIII 1981)
- Suzanne MacFarlane (vol. VII 1981, vol. VIII 1981)
- Luann Parsons (vol. VII 1981, vol. VIII 1981)
- Barbara Ponsolle (vol. VII 1981, vol. VIII 1981)
- Theresa M. Schuster (vol. VII 1981, vol. VIII 1981)

== Publication data ==
Volume	Date	Ships	Notes
I	1959	A–B	Out of print
II	1963	C–F	Out of print
III	1968	G–K	Out of print
IV	1969	L–M	
V	1970	N–Q	Out of print
VI	1976	R–S	
VII	1981	T–V	
VIII	1981	W–Z	Out of print
I-A	1991	A	Out of print
Hazegray		A–Z	Histories end at dates above
Naval History and Heritage Command		A–Z	Histories being brought up to date

DANFS was published in print by the Naval Historical Center (NHC) as bound hardcover volumes, ordered by ship name, from Volume I (A–B) in 1959 to Volume VIII (W–Z) in 1981. Several volumes subsequently went out of print. In 1991 a revised Volume I Part A, covering only ship names beginning with A, was released. Work continues on revisions of the remaining volumes.

Volunteers at the Hazegray website undertook to transcribe the DANFS and make it available on the World Wide Web. The project goal is a direct transcription of the DANFS, with changes limited to correcting typographical errors and editorial notes for incorrect facts in the original. In 2008 the NHC was re-designated as the Naval History and Heritage Command (NHHC). It has developed an online version of DANFS (see External links section below) through a combination of optical character recognition (OCR) and hand transcription. The NHHC is slowly updating its online DANFS to correct errors and take into account the gap in time between the print publication and the present date. NHHC prioritizes updates as follows: ships currently commissioned, ships commissioned after the original volume publication, ships decommissioned after original volume publication, and finally updates to older ships. The NHHC has begun a related project to place Ship History and Command Operations Reports online at their site.

== Reference use ==
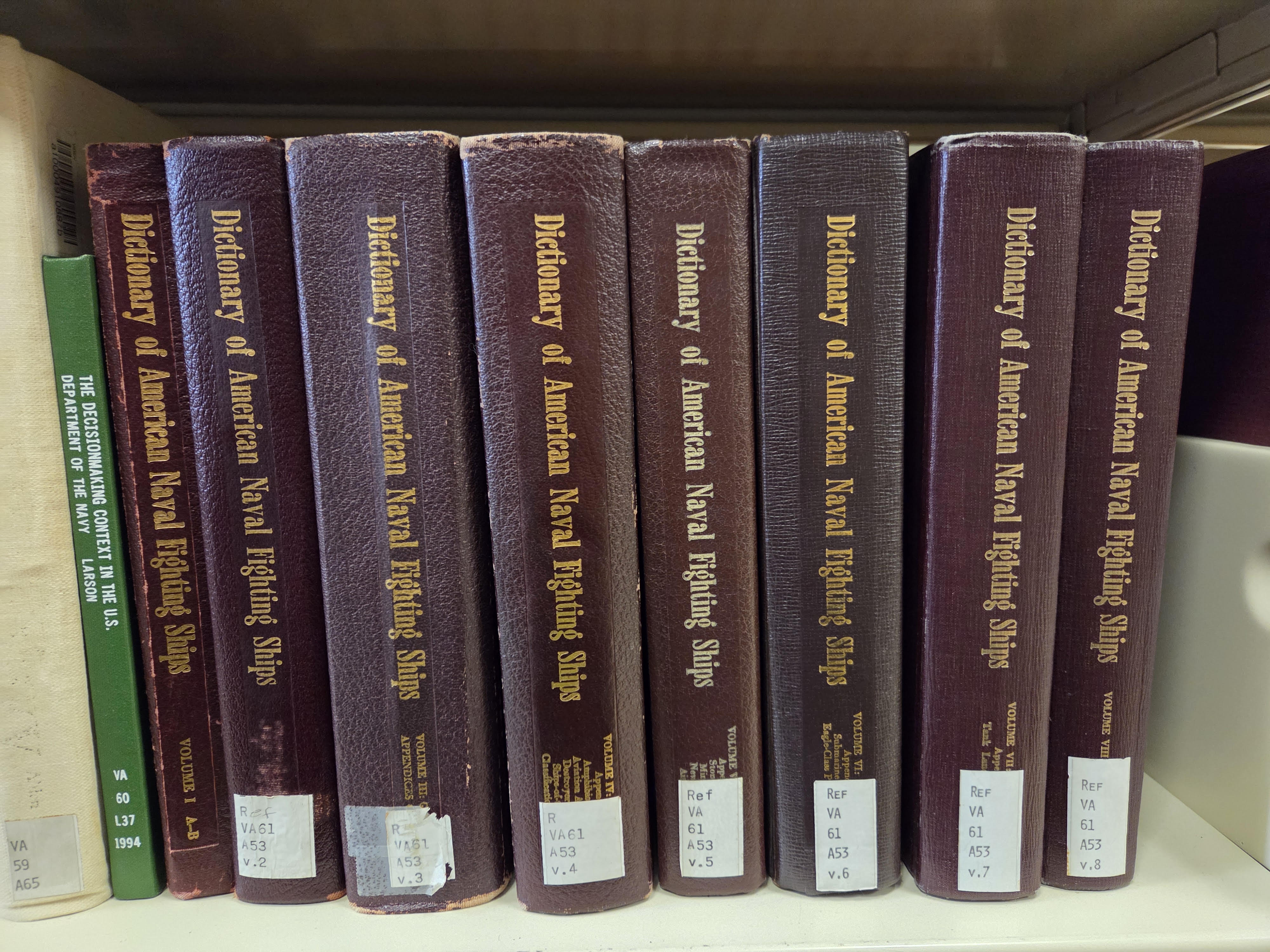
A complete eight-book set of the dictionary at a college library

As the DANFS is a work of the U.S. government, its content is in the public domain, and the text is often quoted verbatim in other works. Many websites organized by former and active crew members of U.S. Navy vessels include a copy of their ships' DANFS entries.

The Dictionary limits itself largely to basic descriptions and brief operational notes, and includes almost no analysis or historical context.
