= Admiral Potter =

Admiral Potter may refer to:

- Bonnie Burnham Potter (born 1947), U.S. Navy rear admiral
- William P. Potter (1850–1917), U.S. Navy rear admiral

== See also ==
- Édouard Pottier (1839–1903), French Navy vice admiral
