= Fran McKee =

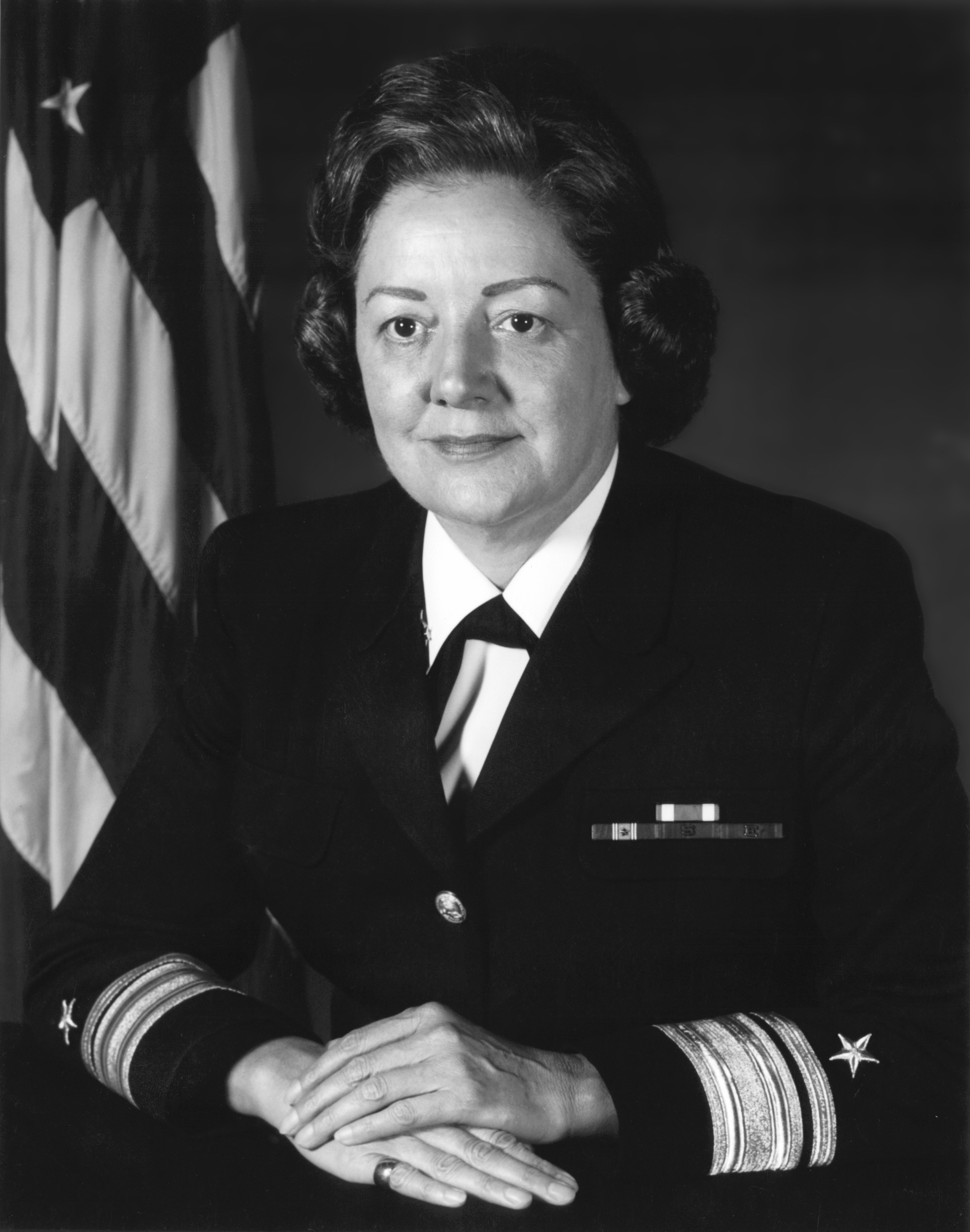
- Rear Admiral Fran McKee
- Born: September 13, 1926; Florence, Alabama, U.S.
- Died: March 3, 2002 (aged 75); Annandale, Virginia, U.S.
- Burial place: Arlington National Cemetery
- Military career
- Allegiance: United States of America
- Branch: United States Navy
- Service years: 1950 - 1981
- Rank: Rear Admiral
- Unit: Assistant Chief of Naval Personnel for Human Resource Management
- Awards: Legion of Merit (2); Meritorious Service Medal; National Defense Service Medal with Bronze Star; Expert Pistol Medal; Sharpshooter Rifle Ribbon
- Other work: Member of the Armed Services YMCA of USA National Committee, Chair of the Legislative and Employment Committee of the VA Women's Advisory Committee for Veterans Affairs, member of the National Advisory Committee for the Women in Military Service for America Memorial Foundation

Fran McKee (September 13, 1926 – March 3, 2002) was the first female line officer to hold the rank of Rear Admiral in the United States Navy. She was promoted to the rank of Rear Admiral (Lower Half) on June 1, 1976, and earned her second star in November 1978. Rear Admiral McKee was one of the first two women selected to attend the Naval War College, and was the first woman to command an activity of the Naval Security Group Command.

Rear Admiral McKee retired from the Navy in 1981, and died on March 3, 2002, aged 75, after suffering a cerebral hemorrhage; she was buried with full military honors at Arlington National Cemetery on April 8, 2002. A reception was held in the Women in Military Service for America Memorial at Arlington, Virginia. She was inducted into the Alabama Women's Hall of Fame in 2007.

== Military biography ==
McKee was born in Florence, Alabama. She was commissioned as ensign on December 4, 1950, and spent the next four years in the Office of Naval Research as assistant to the director, Physical Science Division, and then as administrative aide to the chief of naval research. In May 1954 she became women procurement officer at Navy Recruiting Station and Office of Naval Officer Procurement in Boston, Massachusetts.

After attending the General Line School, U.S. Naval Postgraduate School, Monterey, California, in September 1957 she was appointed personnel officer at Naval Air Station Port Lyautey, Morocco. From September 1958 she was training coordinator at the Damage Control School, Treasure Island, San Francisco, California.

McKee then served as classification/mobilization officer on the staff of the chief of Naval Air Reserve Training from January 1962; as officer-in-charge of the Naval Women Officers School, Newport, Rhode Island, from June 1965; and as personnel officer at Naval Station Rota, Spain, from October 1967.

In August 1969 McKee reported to the Naval War College in Newport, Rhode Island, as one of the first two women selected to attend the regular curriculum, graduating in June 1970.

She was then appointed head of the Special Inquiries and Publication Section, Officer Distribution Division of the Bureau of Naval Personnel in June 1970, and served as deputy assistant chief of naval personnel for human goals from September 1972.

From September 1973 to May 1976, with the rank of captain, McKee commanded the Naval Security Group Activity at Fort George G. Meade, Maryland. She was the first woman assigned to head an activity of the Naval Security Group Command.

In February 1976, McKee became the first woman line officer to be selected for flag rank. From June 1, 1976, with the rank of rear admiral (lower half), she was director of naval education development at the Naval Education and Training Command, Pensacola, Florida, and from June 1, 1978, assistant chief of naval personnel for human resource management with additional duty as assistant deputy chief of naval operations (human resource management). She received promotion to rear admiral (upper half) in November 1978.

McKee retired from the Navy in 1981.

In the 1980s, she was awarded the Daughters of the American Revolution's Medal of Honor by President General Patricia Walton Shelby.

== Education ==
McKee graduated with a degree in chemistry from the University of Alabama in 1950. She graduated from the Naval Line Officer's School, the Naval Postgraduate School and the Naval War College. McKee earned a master's degree in international affairs from George Washington University, Washington, D.C., in 1970. McKee also received an honorary doctorate in public administration from the Massachusetts Maritime Academy.

== See also ==
- Women in the United States Navy
- List of female United States military generals and flag officers
