= Women's Armed Services Integration Act =

United States law enacted 1948

- Long title: An Act to establish the Women's Army Corps in the Regular Army, to authorize the enlistment and appointment of women in the Regular Air Force, Regular Navy and Marine Corps, and in the Reserve components of the Army, Navy, Air Force, and Marine Corps, and for other purposes.
- Enacted by: the 80th United States Congress

Citations
- Public law: Pub. L. 80-625
- Statutes at Large: 62 Stat. 356

Legislative history
- Introduced in the Senate as S. 1641 by Margaret Chase Smith on July 16, 1947; Signed into law by President Harry S. Truman on June 12, 1948

Women's Armed Services Integration Act (Pub. L. 80–625, 62 Stat. 356, enacted June 12, 1948) is a United States law that enabled women to serve as permanent, regular members of the armed forces in the Army, Navy, Marine Corps, and the recently formed Air Force. Prior to this act, women, with the exception of nurses, served in the military only in times of war. During World War II, over 150,000 women had served in the WAVES (the Navy) and the Women's Auxiliary Army Corps and were still serving when the act was enacted. Women also took part in the SPARS, which was created by the Coast Guard, and the Marine Corps Women's Reserve, during the war. In total, 350,000 American women joined and served during World War II. Section 502 of the act limited service of women by excluding them from aircraft and vessels of the Navy that might engage in combat.

== History ==
The bill was proposed to the 80th U. S. Congress by Margaret Chase Smith, who served in both houses of the U.S. Congress, representing the state of Maine. The bill went to Armed Services Committees of both the House and Senate in January 1948. However, there were opponents in the House who believed that women should serve in reserve capacity only. The leaders of the opposition were Walter G. Andrews, House Armed Services Committee chairman, and Carl Vinson, the committee's ranking minority member. According to Bettie Morden: "These men believed that women should not be admitted to the Regular Army until their peacetime service could be studied and observed." A counterattack was organized. When the House Armed Services Committee met for hearings on the bill on February 18, 1948, high-ranking civilian and military officials attended to argue for approval of the bill. They included Secretary of Defense James Forrestal, Dwight D. Eisenhower, General Omar Bradley, Admiral Louis Denfeld, and General Hoyt Vandenberg. For two further days, the chairman led a thorough analysis, section by section, of the bill; he questioned Women's Army Corps Director Col. Mary Hallaren and the Army's Assistant Chief of Staff Gen. Willard Paul over its contents. On March 23, 1948, The committee rejected regular status and rewrote and re-titled the bill as the "Women's Armed Services Reserve Act of 1948." On April 21, 1948, the Women's Armed Services Reserve Act reached the House floor. Supporters and opposition both had a chance to argue the bill. Voting on the revised act passed and it was sent to the Senate. But the Senate would not accept the revised bill. In May, a joint committee was convened to attempt to reach a compromise.

The decaying situation internationally strengthened the argument for women's regular status.

The Russians had gained political control over Czechoslovakia and had restricted rail and highway traffic into West Berlin. These cold war developments and the Army's inability to recruit enough men for an all-volunteer force led President Truman to ask for a peacetime draft. Some politicians, reluctant to vote for the draft, did not want their constituents to believe they had turned down a potential source of volunteers--women. For this reason, many congressmen changed their minds about permitting women to enter the Regular Army.

On May 19, 1948, the House relented and agreed to women serving in both the regular and reserve components of the armed services. The original wording of the bill was restored with two amendments: a limit on the number of women in regular status between 1948 and 1950 and provision that female officers would be commissioned in multiple increments instead of just one. Morden states that "House members were satisfied that these amendments would deter indiscriminate commissioning and enlisting of women and prevent any suggestion of favored treatment."

On May 26, the Senate unanimously approved the bill. The House approved it on June 2 with a vote of 206 to 133. President Truman signed the bill on June 12, 1948.

The Navy swore in its first six women enlistees on July 7, 1948, and later that year commissioned as a lieutenant commander Frances Lois Willoughby, who had served in World War II in the Naval Reserve, its first female doctor. Hundreds began basic training in the Army before the end of the year. The Marine Corps launched its program by inducting some of its women reservists and those who served in the Marine Corps Women's Reserve in World War II. The New York Times referred to them as "'Marinettes'".

Despite the passage of the act, the Army established, in October 1949, a regulation that mothers with dependent children were ineligible to serve in the military, and female servicewomen with children under the age of 18 were to be discharged. This regulation remained in place until federal legislation in the 1970s established the inclusion of women with children in the armed forces.

In 1967, Public Law 90-160 was passed with which removed the 1948 2% cap on the number of enlisted women allowed in the military, as well as removing the 10% cap on officers. However, § 6398 mandated that any woman at the rank of O-6 (captain in the USN, colonel in the Army, Air Force, and Marines) retire on the first month after completing 30 years of service.

In 1998, a ceremony commemorating the 50th anniversary of the Women's Armed Services Act was held at the Women in Military Service for America (WIMSA) Memorial in Arlington National Cemetery. Deputy Secretary of Defense John J. Hamre delivered the keynote address.

== See also ==
- Defense Department Advisory Committee on Women in the Services
- Women in the military
- WAVES
