= Louise Currie Wilmot =

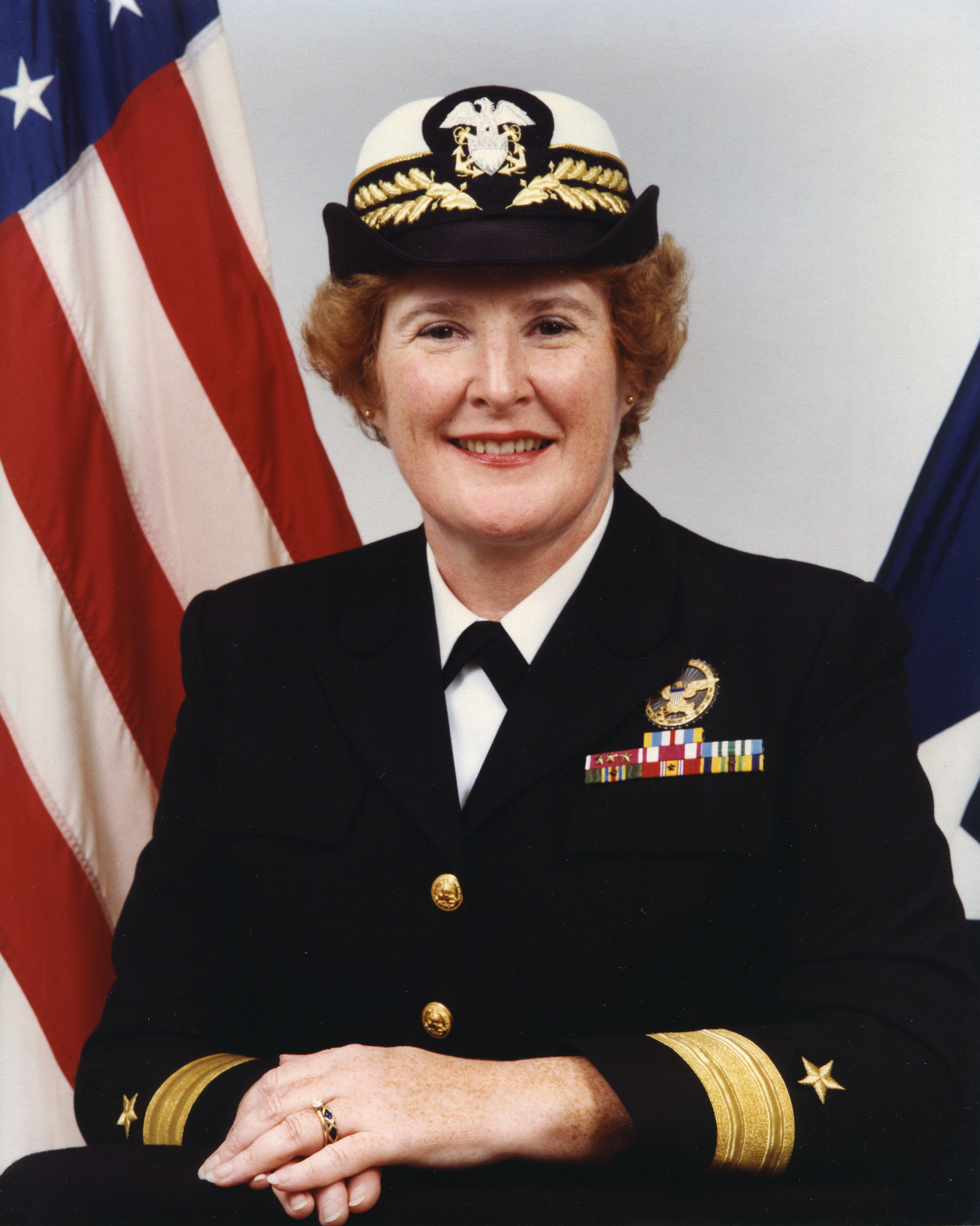
- Rear Admiral Louise Currie Wilmot
- Born: December 31, 1942 (age 83); Wayne, New Jersey
- Military career
- Allegiance: United States
- Branch: United States Navy
- Service years: 1964–1994
- Rank: Rear Admiral
- Commands: Philadelphia Naval Base; Naval Training Center Orlando; Navy Recruiting Area Five, Great Lakes; Navy Recruiting District, Omaha
- Awards: Navy Distinguished Service Medal; Defense Superior Service Medal; Legion of Merit (4); Meritorious Service Medal; Joint Services Commendation Medal
- Other work: Deputy Executive Director, Catholic Relief Services

Rear Admiral Louise Currie Wilmot (born December 31, 1942) is a retired United States Navy officer who was the first woman to command a United States Naval base. When she retired after 30 years of service, she was the highest ranking female naval officer in the United States.

== Early life ==
Raised in Wayne, New Jersey, Wilmot attended Wayne Valley High School and earned a degree in history from the College of Saint Elizabeth in Morris Township, New Jersey, in 1964.

== Navy career ==
- Commanding Officer, Navy Recruiting District, Omaha (1979–)
- Commander of the Navy Recruiting Area Five in Great Lakes, Michigan (1985–)
- Executive Assistant and Naval Aide to the Assistant Secretary of the Navy for Manpower and Reserve Affairs
- Vice Chief of Naval Education and Training in Pensacola, Florida
- Commander of the Naval Training Center in Orlando, Florida (1989–)
- Commanding Officer, Naval Base Philadelphia (1993–1994)

Wilmot retired in 1994. She was the highest ranking female Naval officer at that time.

== Awards and decorations ==
Wilmot's decorations include the Navy Distinguished Service Medal, the Defense Superior Service Medal, the Legion of Merit (with three gold stars), the Meritorious Service Medal, and the Joint Services Commendation Medal.

== Education ==
Wilmot earned a master's degree from George Washington University in 1978 and was recognized with the GW Alumni Association's Distinguished Alumni Award in 1994.

== Post-navy career ==
Following retirement Wilmot joined Catholic Relief Services as deputy executive director of public outreach.

Wilmot's papers are kept by the Special Collections and Archives Department of the United States Naval Academy.

== See also ==
- Women in the United States Navy
