= Linda J. Bird =

United States admiral

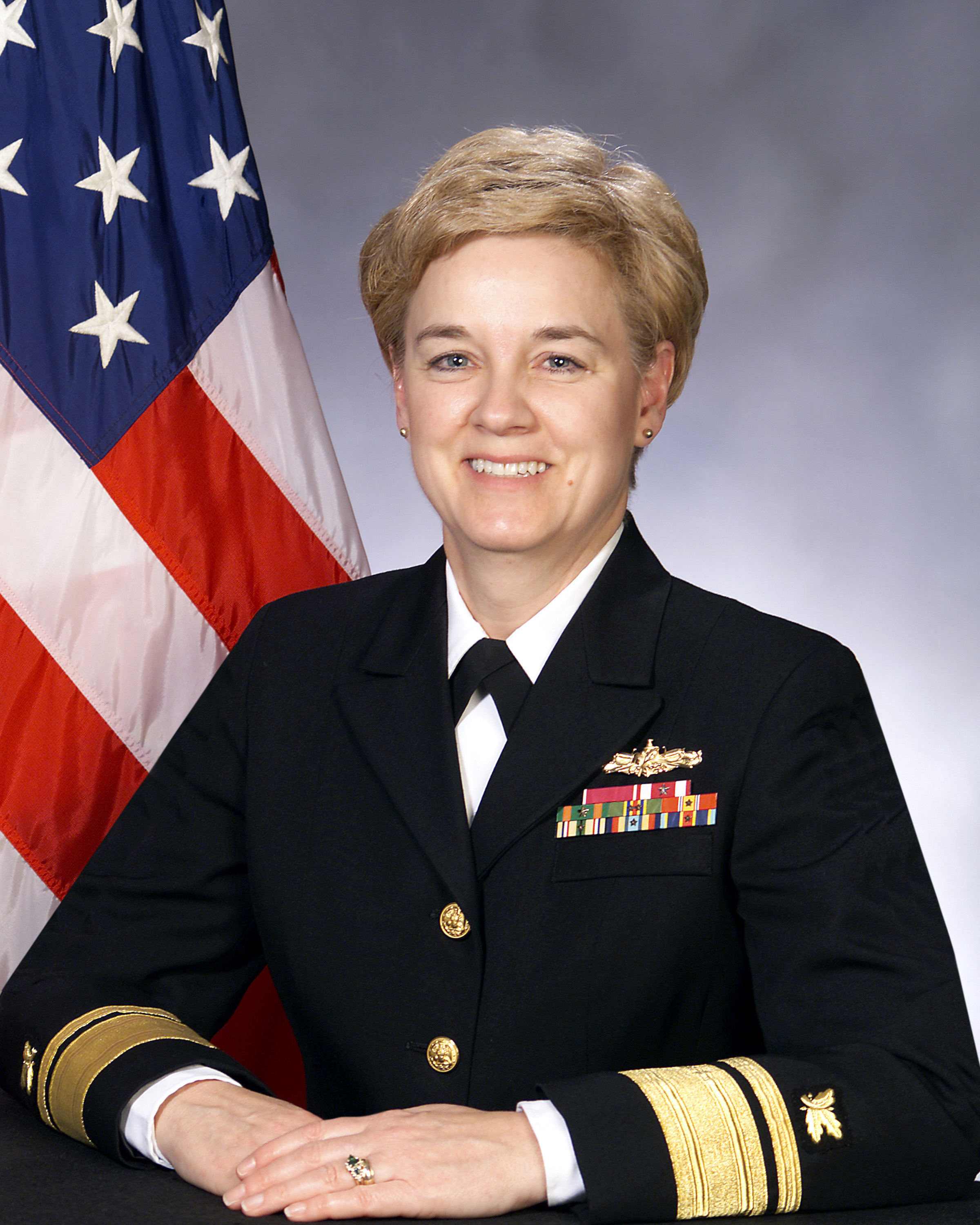
- Rear Admiral Linda J. Bird, SC, USN
- Born: February 2, 1951 (age 75); Auburn, Washington, United States
- Military career
- Allegiance: United States of America
- Branch: United States Navy
- Service years: 1974–2005
- Rank: Rear admiral
- Commands: Defense Supply Center, Columbus
- Awards: Defense Superior Service Medal; Legion of Merit; Meritorious Service Medal; Navy Achievement Medal

Rear Admiral Linda Jeanne Bird, SC, USN, was the first woman in the United States Navy Supply Corps promoted to flag rank.

== Early life ==
Bird is a native of Auburn, Washington.

== Education ==
Bird graduated from Green River Community College, Auburn, Washington, in 1971, then transferred to Western Washington University, where she earned a degree in secondary education in 1973. She earned a master's degree in inventory management in 1984 from the Naval Postgraduate School in Monterey, California.

== Navy career ==
Bird received her navy commission through the Naval Officer Candidate School in June 1974. Her sea duty tours include stores officer and stock control officer of USS Frank Cable (AS-40), and supply officer of USS Puget Sound (AD-38).

Her shore duty tours include assignments as director of the Navy Supply Corps Museum; food service and stock control officer of Naval Air Station, Brunswick, Maine; material and logistics officer of U.S. Navy Public Works Center, Yokosuka, Japan; Aviation Consolidated Allowance List (AVCAL) and Consolidated Shipboard Allowance List (COSAL) inventory and financial manager, Commander Naval Air Force, U.S. Atlantic Fleet; director of the Systems Integrity Department, Naval Supply Center, Norfolk, Virginia; and head of the Supply Policy Branch in the Supply Programs and Policy Division (N41), Office of the Chief of Naval Operations.

In 1994, Bird joined the Naval Supply Systems Command (NAVSUP) as director of Navy Defense Business Operations Fund Division, and then served as director of Supply Corps Assignment/Placement Branch, Office of Supply Corps Personnel, Bureau of Naval Personnel. In March 1998, she returned to NAVSUP Headquarters as deputy commander for financial management/comptroller. In 1999, Bird was promoted to rear admiral (lower half) as the first female flag officer in the Supply Corps and was assigned as the vice commander of Naval Supply Systems Command. Bird served as director of Supply, Ordnance and Logistics Operations Division, N41, Office of the Chief of Naval Operations, Washington, D.C., and was nominated for the rank of rear admiral (upper half) in July 2002.

Bird became commander of Defense Supply Center, Columbus in Columbus, Ohio, on July 18, 2003. As DSCC's commander, oversaw an operating budget of $2.8 billion. She also directed the functions of 2,300 associates involved in purchasing materiel, monitoring inventory levels, maintaining technical data and assuring quality conformance of more than 1.6 million spare and repair parts used by over 24,000 military units and civilian federal agencies.

Bird retired November 1, 2005, after more than 31 years of service.

== Awards and decorations ==
Her personal awards include the Defense Superior Service Medal, Legion of Merit, Meritorious Service Medal, Navy Achievement Medal, and various campaign and unit awards.

- Defense Superior Service Medal
- Legion of Merit
- Meritorious Service Medal
- Navy and Marine Corps Achievement Medal

== See also ==
- Women in the United States Navy
