= Annette E. Brown =

Retired Rear Admiral of the United States Navy

Annette Elise Brown
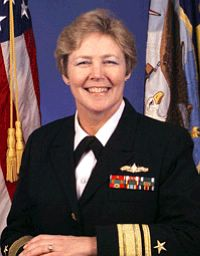
- Rear Admiral Annette Elise Brown
- Born: August 24, 1950 (age 76); Los Angeles, California
- Military career
- Branch: United States Navy
- Service years: 1974-2005
- Rank: Rear admiral
- Commands: MSCO Bremerhaven, Germany; Naval Station Everett; Navy Region Southeast
- Awards: Legion of Merit; Meritorious Service Medal; Navy and Marine Corps Commendation Medal

Annette Elise Brown is a retired rear admiral of the United States Navy.

== Early life ==
A native of Los Angeles, California, Brown attended Virginia Polytechnic Institute and State University and graduated with a B.S. in business management in 1973.

== Navy career ==
In 1974, Brown completed Navy Officer Candidate School and was commissioned an ensign. Her initial assignment was at the U.S. Air Facility, Sigonella in Sicily. This was followed by a tour on the staff of the Commander Pacific Fleet, where she volunteered for the Women at Sea Program. As a result, Brown was assigned to USS Prairie (AD-15) as operations officer and navigator. She qualified as a surface warfare officer.

A tour on the staff of Commander, Navy Surface Forces Pacific from 1982 to 1984 was followed by three tours of duty with the Military Sealift Command (MSC). Brown was with the MSC in San Diego, California, and then in Washington, D.C., followed by a tour as Commanding Officer, MSCO Bremerhaven, Germany, directing the shipment of United States Army vehicles and equipment through northern European ports in support of Operations Desert Shield and Desert Storm.

After a subsequent tour as the chief of staff for Commander, Naval Base Seattle, she assumed the duties of Commanding Officer, Naval Station Everett, Washington State, which she held from 1996 until 1998.

In July 1998, Brown was nominated for rear admiral (lower half).

From October 1998 to March 2000, she was the director, Shore Installation Management Division (N46) on the staff of the Chief of Naval Operations. From March 2000 until September 2002, she was the assistant commander, Navy Personnel Command (Personal Readiness and Community Support) at Millington, Tennessee.

In June 2001, Brown was nominated for the rank of rear admiral (upper half) and assumed duties as commander, Navy Region Southeast on October 29, 2002. Brown was the first woman to command Navy Region Southeast. She retired on December 9, 2005, after her change of command ceremony.

== Awards and decorations ==
Brown's military decorations include the Legion of Merit, the Meritorious Service Medal and the Navy and Marine Corps Commendation Medal.

- Legion of Merit
- Meritorious Service Medal
- Navy and Marine Corps Commendation Medal

== Education ==
Brown earned a master's degree in business management from the Naval Postgraduate School.

== See also ==
- Women in the United States Navy
- United States Navy
