= Roberta L. Hazard =

United States admiral (1934–2017)

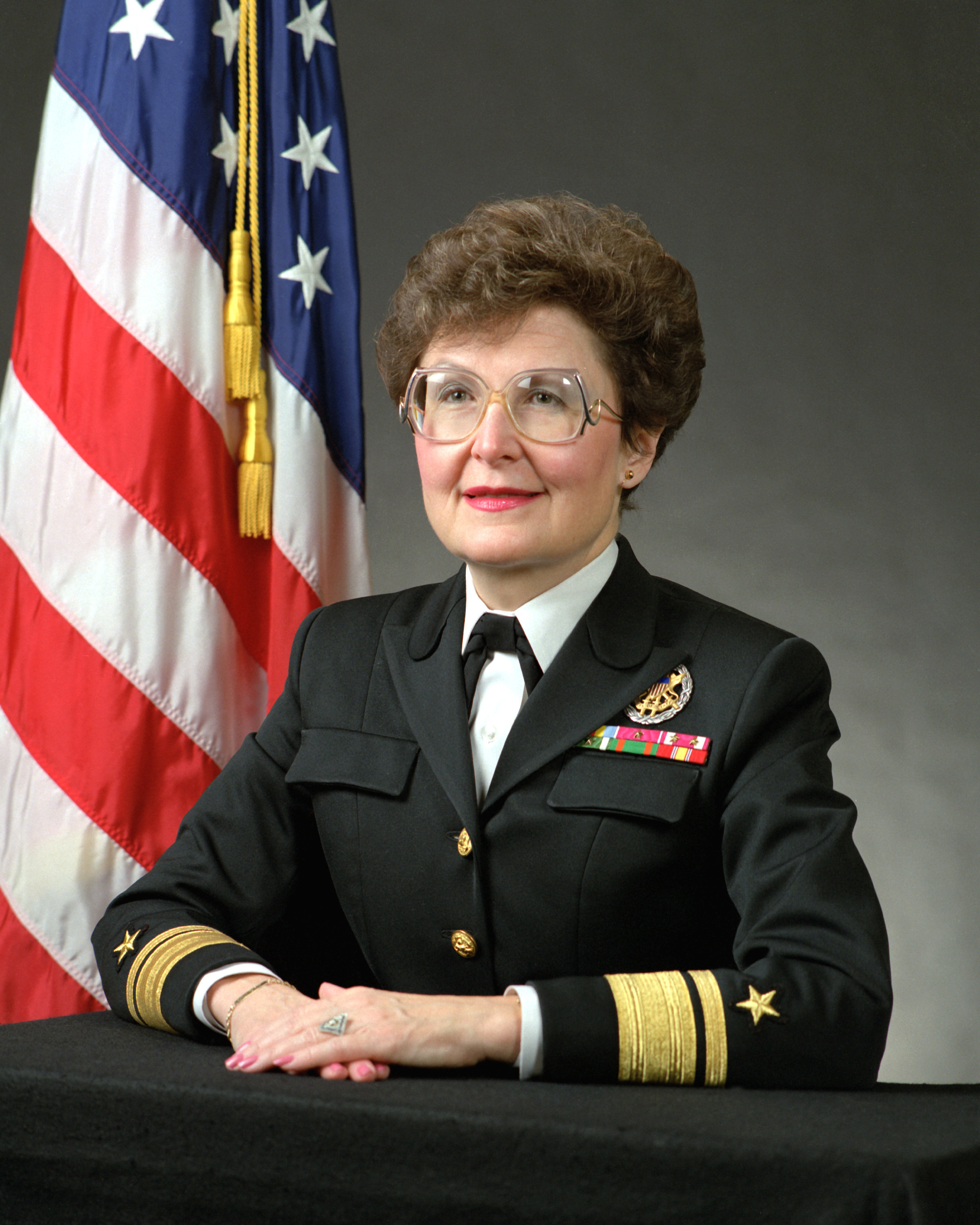
- Rear Admiral Hazard in 1990
- Born: 8 November 1934; Boston, Massachusetts, U.S.
- Died: 25 March 2017 (aged 82); Escanaba, Michigan, U.S.
- Military career
- Allegiance: United States of America
- Branch: United States Navy
- Service years: 1960–1992
- Rank: Rear admiral
- Commands: Naval Technical Training Center, Treasure Island, California; Naval Administrative Command, San Diego Naval Training Center; Commander, Naval Training Center, Great Lakes, Illinois
- Awards: Legion of Merit (with gold star), the Meritorious Service Medal (with two gold stars), the Navy Commendation Medal (with one gold star), the Navy Achievement Medal, and the National Defense Service Medal

Rear Admiral Roberta L. Hazard (November 8, 1934 – March 25, 2017) was the third female line officer to be promoted to the rank of rear admiral in the United States Navy, and at the time, the highest-ranking woman in the U.S. military. She was the first woman to command a United States Naval Training Command.

== Biography ==
Admiral Hazard, a native of Boston, Massachusetts, and a Boston College graduate, taught history at the senior high school level prior to entering the United States Navy in 1960.

On March 25, 2017, Rear Admiral Hazard died in Michigan, where she had been living for many years.

== Naval career ==
Hazard attended Officer Candidate School and was commissioned an ensign in December 1960. She was assigned as division officer and researcher-writer within the Naval History Division, Office of the Chief of Naval Operations. She served in that capacity until December 1962, receiving a promotion to lieutenant (jg) in June of that year. Hazard next reported as the education, training, and leadership officer at Naval Air Station Jacksonville in Florida.

Leaving Jacksonville in January 1965, she joined the Woman Officer Candidate School in Newport, Rhode Island, as an instructor and academic department head. Promoted to lieutenant that July, Hazard remained in Newport until November 1967, when she departed for a two-year tour as protocol officer in the Office of the Chief of Naval Operations. In November 1969, she reported to the U.S. Naval Academy as manager of a computer-assisted instruction project. Advanced to the rank of lieutenant commander in August 1970, her service at the academy continued until January 1971.

From 1971 to 1974, she again served in the Office of the Chief of Naval Operations, first as special assistant and secretary. She became special project/action officer within the Middle East, African Section, Politico-Military Affairs Division (OP-61) in August 1973 and assistant secretary for Joint Chiefs of Staff matters (OP-004) as of November 1973. For the final six months of her tour, from June to December 1974, Hazard was special assistant to the former chief of Naval Operations.

She was next assigned as special assistant to the commander in chief of Allied Forces Southern Europe in Naples, Italy, serving as speech writer and political-military advisor. Promoted to commander in July 1976, she graduated from the National War College two years later and was assigned to the Military Personnel and Training Division, Bureau of Personnel as head of the women's program section.

Beginning in 1980, she held three successive command tours. The first was Naval Technical Training Center, Treasure Island, California. While in that assignment, Hazard was advanced to the rank of captain. Her next assignment, from December 1982 until July 1985, was commanding officer of Naval Administrative Command, at San Diego Naval Training Center. Following selection to flag rank in December 1984, she commanded the Navy's largest training facility, Great Lakes Naval Training Center in Illinois, from July 1985 through August 1987.

Hazard became the director for manpower and personnel, Organization of the Joint Chiefs of Staff in August 1987. She was selected for promotion to rear admiral (upper half) on May 18, 1988, the first woman to be board selected for that grade. On August 31, 1988, she assumed the duties as director of human resources management and director of Personnel Excellence Program, Office of the Chief of Naval Operations. Her final tour, as assistant chief of naval personnel, personal readiness and community support, extended from August 1989 through September 1992. In 1990 and 1991 she also chaired the NATO Committee on Women in the Armed Forces.

== Education ==
Roberta Louise Hazard graduated magna cum laude from Boston College with majors in history and education. She also received a master's degree in history from Boston College. She graduated from the National War College in 1978.

== Awards and decorations ==
Her decorations include the Legion of Merit (with gold star in lieu of second award), the Meritorious Service Medal (with two gold stars in lieu of a subsequent award), the Navy Commendation Medal (with one gold star in lieu of a second award), the Navy Achievement Medal, and the National Defense Service Medal.

- Legion of Merit with Gold Star
- Meritorious Service Medal with two Gold Stars
- Navy and Marine Corps Commendation Medal with Gold Star
- Navy and Marine Corps Achievement Medal
- National Defense Service Medal

== See also ==
Women in the United States Navy
