= Bonnie Burnham Potter =

United States Navy admiral (born 1947)

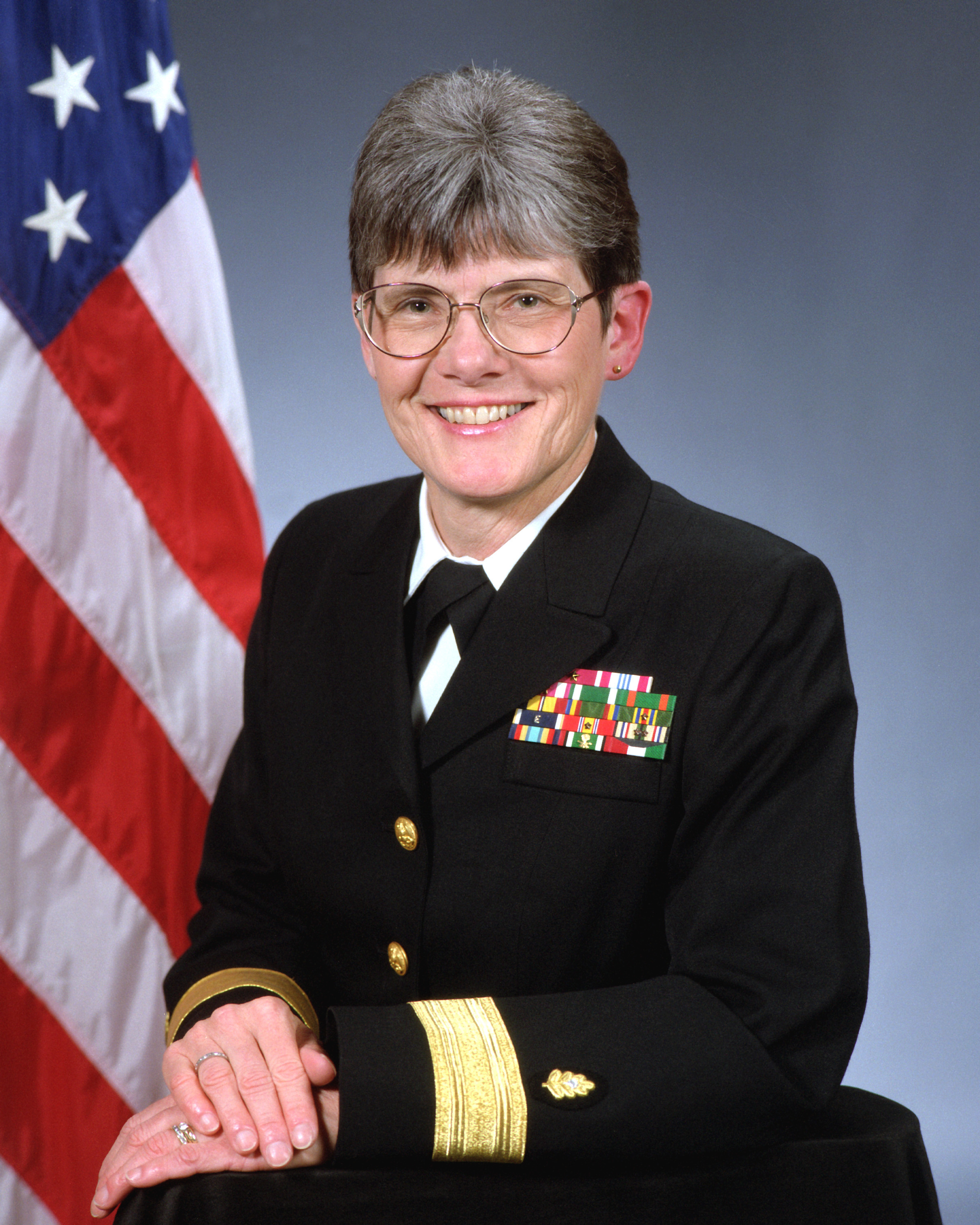
- Rear Admiral Potter in 1997
- Born: March 23, 1947 (age 79); Berkeley, California, U.S.
- Military career
- Allegiance: United States
- Branch: United States Navy
- Service years: 1973–2003
- Rank: Rear Admiral
- Commands: National Naval Medical Center; Naval Hospital, Camp Pendleton
- Conflicts: Gulf War
- Awards: Defense Superior Service Medal (2); Legion of Merit (2); Defense Meritorious Service Medal; Meritorious Service Medal (2); Navy and Marine Corps Commendation Medal; Navy and Marine Corps Achievement Medal

Rear Admiral Bonnie Burnham Potter (born March 23, 1947) was the first female physician in the Navy Medical Corps to be selected for flag rank. She served as the commanding officer of the National Naval Medical Center at Bethesda, Maryland and Chief of the Navy Medical Corps.

== Early life ==
A native of Piedmont, California, Potter graduated from the University of California, Davis in 1968 with a bachelor's degree in Animal Science. Following completion of medical technology training, she attended graduate school at the University of California, Davis in Animal Physiology. She received her Doctor of Medicine degree from Saint Louis University School of Medicine in 1975.

Potter is a fellow of the American College of Physicians and is certified by the American Board of Internal Medicine, with a certificate of Added Qualifications in Geriatrics. Prior to her retirement from active duty she held faculty appointments at both the Uniformed Services University of the Health Sciences and Georgetown University School of Medicine.

== Navy career ==
Potter completed her internship and residency in internal medicine at the Naval Regional Medical Center (NRMC), Oakland, California, where she was Chief Resident from 1978 to 1979. She remained at NRMC Oakland as a staff internist and Residency Training Officer until 1983. She was assigned as Assistant Head, Internal Medicine Department, Naval Hospital, Portsmouth, Va. from 1983 to 1987. She also served as the Command Intern Coordinator and Transitional Residency Program Director.

In 1987, Potter transferred to the Uniformed Services University of the Health Sciences, F. Edward Hebert School of Medicine, Bethesda, Maryland, where she performed duties as the Medicine Clerkship Coordinator, and Physical Diagnosis Coordinator for National Naval Medical Center, Bethesda, Maryland. From January 1989 to April 1993, she served as the National Naval Medical Center, Bethesda, chairman and Program Director, Department of Internal Medicine.

As Head, Medical Services, USNS Comfort (T-AH-20) from August 1990 until April 1991, Potter deployed in support of Operation Desert Shield and Operation Desert Storm.

From May 1993 to May 1995, Potter was stationed at Naval Medical Center, Portsmouth, Virginia, as the Deputy Commander and Director of Academic Affairs. She was the Commanding Officer of Naval Hospital, Camp Pendleton, California from June 1995 to January 1997.

In 1997, Potter's promotion to rear admiral (lower half) marked her as the first female physician in the United States Navy to be selected for flag rank. Potter was then appointed as Commander of the National Naval Medical Center, Bethesda, Maryland where she also served as the Chief, Navy Medical Corps, Bureau of Medicine and Surgery, Washington, D.C. from April 1997 to September 1999 and as the chairman, Region 1 TRICARE Executive Board (Lead Agent) from July 1998 to August 1999.

In 1999, Potter was nominated to the rank of rear admiral (upper half), and in December 1999, reported as fleet surgeon, U.S. Atlantic Fleet. Additional duties included Command Surgeon, U.S. Joint Forces Command and medical advisor, Allied Command, Atlantic.

Potter and her husband retired to California in 2003 where she is active in the Navy League and raises alpacas.

== Awards and decorations ==
Potter's awards include the Defense Superior Service Medal with oak leaf cluster, Legion of Merit with gold star, Defense Meritorious Service Medal, the Meritorious Service Medal with gold star, the Navy Commendation Medal, the Navy Achievement Medal, and the Combat Action Medal.

In 2000, while serving as Fleet Surgeon, U.S. Atlantic Fleet, Potter was awarded the Laureate award by the American College of Physicians-American Society of Internal Medicine (ACP-ASIM) in the U.S. Navy Region for her abiding commitment to excellence in education, research and medical care.

== See also ==
- Women in the United States Navy
- Medical Corps (United States Navy)
