= Frances L. Willoughby =

Frances Lois Willoughby (born July 1, 1905, Harrisburg, Pennsylvania, died May 13, 1984 Woodbury, New Jersey) was an American psychiatrist and the first female doctor commissioned in the United States Navy.

== Biography ==
Willoughby graduated from Dickinson College in 1927 and from the University of Arkansas School of Medicine in 1938. During World War II, she enlisted in the Navy and served in the Naval Reserve before being commissioned a lieutenant commander in 1948 as a result of the Women's Armed Services Integration Act before retiring as a captain in 1964.

She was stationed in Bethesda, Maryland and treated women from auxiliary services at the National Navy Center. She helped to administer the first electric shock treatment in Bethesda. Willoughby went on to treat male patients as well and give neuropsychiatric examinations to navy veterans in Washington, DC.

== Awards and honors ==
- Benjamin Rush Award 1981,
