= Della V. Knight =

- Born: 28 January 1878
- Died: 17 September 1960 (aged 82); Oakland, California, U.S.

Della V. Knight (28 January 1878 – 17 September 1960) went to the German Hospital Training School for Nurses in Brooklyn, New York and graduated on 12 May 1903. Upon completion of Nursing School Della joined the Army Nursing Corps and served actively from July 1904 through September 1907. She left the Army and immediately joined the newly developed Navy Nurses Corps.

== In Washington, D.C. ==
On 13 May 1908, the Naval Appropriations Bill was signed by President Theodore Roosevelt which established the Navy Nurse Corps. The nucleus of the new Navy Nurse Corps was Esther Hasson the superintendent and Lenah Higbee the chief nurse and eighteen other women. They became known as the "Sacred Twenty." Della V. Knight was one of these original nurses. They had no quarters of their own and were given an allowance for quarters and subsistence to rent a house and establish their own mess. They found themselves not welcomed in an environment that was considered a male domain. Their original quarters was on 21st Street, N.W., a few blocks from the Naval Hospital.

Prior to 1909, all navy nurses had only one duty station at the Naval Hospital in Washington D.C. In 1909, this was revised and nurses were now detailed to medical facilities outside of Washington D.C. to Annapolis Md., Brooklyn N.Y., and Mare Island, California. Upon completion of her Navy Nursing Program in Washington D.C., she was assigned to the Naval Hospital Brooklyn New York on 15 March 1909. Commanding officers were taken aback by the first female nurses in an all-male hospital, and questioned their ability to perform. Della V. Knight was assigned to the Naval Hospital, Brooklyn, New York, on 15 March 1909.

== In Guam ==
In 1907, the School for Instruction and Licensing of Midwives was organized in Guam. In 1910, the school was officially designated as a U.S. Naval Hospital, and by 1912 with two sections; one for the care of Navy and Marine personnel and the other for locals of both sexes over the age of 12. In 1911, three navy nurses arrived on Guam to establish a formal nurses training program, headed by Elizabeth Leonhardt as chief nurse and one of the original "Sacred Twenty." It was the only U.S. Naval Hospital which had a women's and children's ward. Della V. Knight was transferred and assigned to Guam as replacement for Elizabeth Leonhard in November 1914.

Upon her arrival, Della Knight saw that the Native Nursing Program had a problem with recruitment. She was aware that there would be a need for more trained Chamorro (native) nurses to work in the hospital and at medical stations in villages across the island. The program required that women had to leave their homes and take board at the naval hospital. Culturally, this was not acceptable for many. They were required at that time to have a male or older female family member as chaperone to protect the reputations of unmarried women. Realizing that the upper-class women were willing and anxious to do the work, she had to come up with a plan that would be acceptable to family members. She heard about Maria Roberto who was highly regarded within the community with a strong morale reputation, and offered her a position as chaperone at the hospital. Maria Roberto accepted and the program began to recruit many unmarried women and the Native Nursing Program became quite successful.

In October through December 1916, Knight was transferred to Fort Baynard, New Mexico for an unnamed treatment.

== Writings ==
Knight began writing major articles on nursing procedures and experiences. She wrote "United States Naval Hospital, Ft. Lyon Colorado"; "Red Cross Work in the Northern Pacific Disaster"; and an editorial of the American Medical Association, dated 25 January 1919, "The Supply of Practical Nurses." Della Knight wrote and published an article on her experience in setting up the Native Nursing Program in Guam: "Maria Roberta – A Tribute." Ms. Knight wrote in the U.S. Naval Medical bulletin on 23 June 1923, an article: "Care and Treatment of tuberculosis Patients.

== Later life ==
Della V. Knight was transferred to the Navy Retirement List as Chief Nurse in December 1930.

The Navy Medical Department in 1908 was divided into two main categories: Medical Corps Officers and Hospital Corpsmen (referred to as Hospital Stewards and Hospital Apprentices). Whereas the physicians held rank the nurses did not. It was not until 3 July 1942 that the Nurse Corps was finally granted "relative rank" and on 26 February 1944 granted "full military rank." Della V. Knight eventually retired with the rank of Lt. JG.

On 17 September 1960, Della V. Knight died at the Naval Hospital in Oakland, California at the age of 83.
