= Sara M. Cox =

American nurse

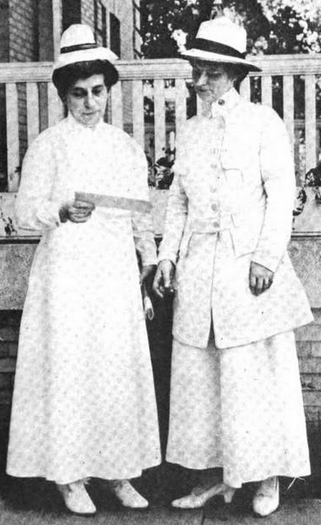
Navy nurses Sara M. Cox and Lenah Higbee in uniform, from a 1918 publication.

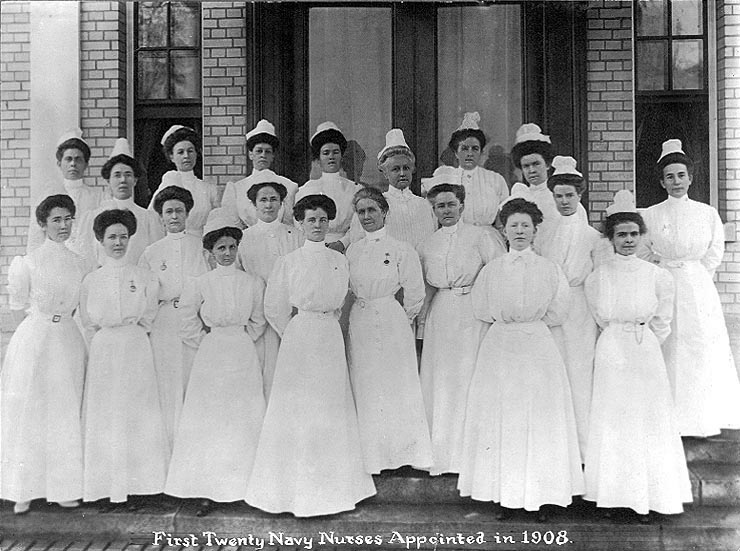
"The Sacred Twenty" of the Navy Nurse Corps in 1908

Sara Matilda Cox (March 15, 1863 – March 30, 1943) was an American nurse, born in Canada, one of the "Sacred Twenty", the first twenty women admitted to the United States Navy Nurse Corps. She was superintendent of nurses at the Naval Hospital in Washington, D.C. during World War I.

== Early life ==
Cox was born near Grand Lake, New Brunswick, British North America. She trained as a nurse in Boston. After her appointment to the Navy Nurse Corps, she had further training at the Naval School Hospital in Washington.

== Career ==
By 1908, Cox had already been an Army nurse and worked in the Philippines during the Spanish–American War. That year, she was chosen to be one of the "Sacred Twenty", the first twenty women admitted to the Navy Nurse Corps when it was established in 1908; the group included Esther Hasson, Lenah Higbee, and Josephine Beatrice Bowman, the first three superintendents of the Navy Nurse Corps. "These women were no more welcome to most of the personnel of the Navy than women are when invading what a man calls his domain", recalled Bowman.

Cox was initially assigned to work at the Naval Hospital in Norfolk, Virginia in 1910. She was promoted to chief nurse at Norfolk in 1911; she transferred from Norfolk to New York in 1914, and from New York to Washington, D.C. in 1916. She served as superintendent of nurses at the Naval Hospital in Washington, D.C. during World War I. In 1921 she was transferred from Washington to San Diego.

In 1920, Cox was part of the wedding party when Nadezhda Troubetskoy, a "Russian princess" training as a nurse at the Naval Hospital, married American soldier Wallace Strait Schutz. Cox retired from the Navy Nurse Corps in 1928.

== Personal life ==
Cox died in 1943, aged 80 years. Her gravesite is in Arlington National Cemetery. The National Museum of American History has her nursing uniform cape in its collection.
