= Sara Cox (disambiguation) =

Sara Cox (born 1974) is a British radio and television presenter.

Sara Cox may also refer to:

- Sara M. Cox (1863–1943), American nurse
- Sara Cox (referee) (born 1990/1991), English rugby union referee

== See also ==
- Sarah Cox (disambiguation)
