= USS Higbee =

Gearing-class destroyer

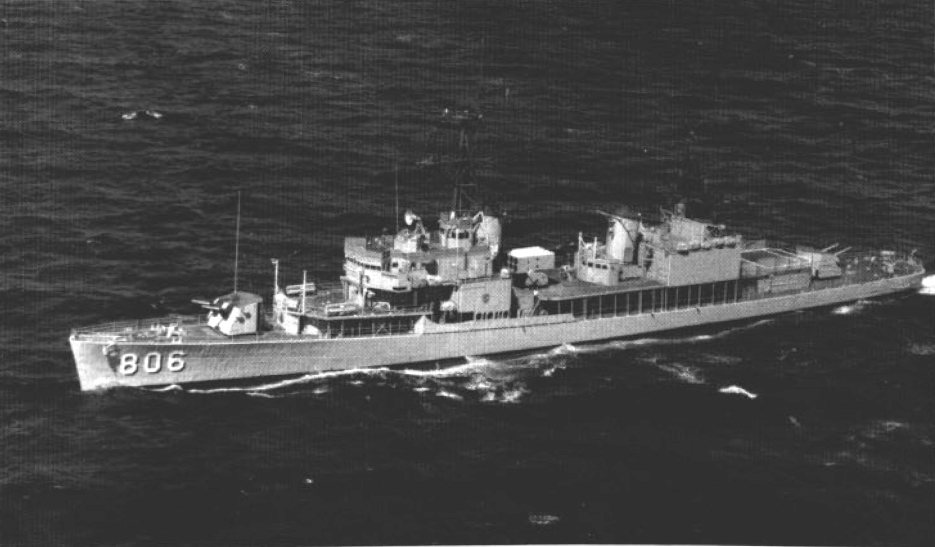
- USS Higbee (DDR-806) in the 1970’s

History

United States
- Name: USS Higbee
- Namesake: Lenah Higbee
- Builder: Bath Iron Works, Bath, Maine, U.S.
- Laid down: 26 June 1944
- Launched: 13 November 1944
- Commissioned: 27 January 1945
- Modernized: 3 January 1964 (FRAM IB)
- Decommissioned: 15 July 1979
- Reclassified: DDR-806, 18 March 1949; DD-806, 1 June 1963
- Stricken: 15 July 1979
- Identification: Callsign: NHLL; Hull number: DD-806
- Nickname(s): "Leaping Lenah"
- Honors and awards: 1 battle star (World War II); 7 battle stars (Korea)
- Fate: Sunk as a target, 24 April 1986

General characteristics
- Class & type: Gearing-class destroyer
- Displacement: 2,425 long tons (2,464 t)
- Length: 390 ft 6 in (119.02 m)
- Beam: 40 ft 10 in (12.45 m)
- Draft: 14 ft 4 in (4.37 m)
- Propulsion: Geared turbines, 2 shafts, 60,000 shp (45 MW)
- Speed: 35 knots (65 km/h; 40 mph)
- Range: 4,500 nmi (8,300 km) at 20 kn (37 km/h; 23 mph)
- Complement: 336
- Armament: 6 × 5"/38 caliber guns; 12 × 40 mm AA guns; 11 × 20 mm AA guns; 10 × 21-inch (533 mm) torpedo tubes; 6 × depth charge projectors; 2 × depth charge tracks; 1 x RUR-5 ASROC Anti Submarine Rocket

USS Higbee (DD/DDR-806) was a Gearing-class destroyer in the United States Navy during World War II. She was the first U.S. warship named for a female member of the U.S. Navy, being named for Chief Nurse Lenah S. Higbee (1874–1941), a pioneering Navy nurse who served as Superintendent of the U.S. Navy Nurse Corps during World War I.

Higbee was launched 13 November 1944 by the Bath Iron Works, Bath, Maine; sponsored by Mrs. A. M. Wheaton, sister of the late Mrs. Higbee; and commissioned on 27 January 1945.

== World War II ==
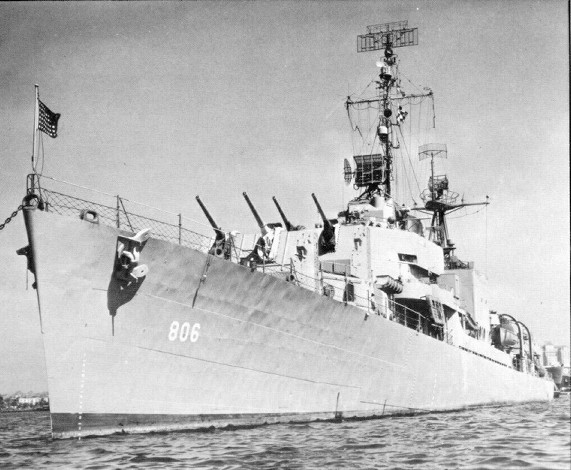
USS Higbee in 1945

Higbee immediately sailed to Boston, where she was converted to a radar picket destroyer. After shakedown in the Caribbean, she sailed for the Pacific on 24 May, joining Carrier Task Force 38 less than 400 miles from Tokyo Bay on 19 July. "Leaping Lenah", as she had been dubbed by her crew, screened the carriers as their planes launched heavy air attacks against the Japanese mainland until the end of hostilities on 15 August. She helped clear Japanese mine fields and supported the occupation forces for the following seven months, finally returning to San Diego on 11 April 1946. The post-war years saw Higbee make two peacetime Western Pacific cruises as well as participate in fleet exercises and tactical training maneuvers during both these cruises and off the West Coast. On her second WestPac cruise, Higbee escorted the heavy cruiser Toledo (CA-133) as they paid official visits to the recently constituted governments of India and Pakistan in the summer of 1948.

== Korean War ==
When Communist troops plunged into South Korea in June 1950, Higbee, redesignated DDR-806 on 18 March 1949, was immediately deployed to the Korean coast with the 7th Fleet. Most of her Korean War duty came in screening the Fast Carrier Task Force 77 as their jets launched raids against Communist positions and supply lines. On 15 September she formed part of the shore bombardment and screening group for the amphibious operation at Inchon. Higbee returned to San Diego on 8 February 1951. In two subsequent stints in Korea, she continued to screen the carrier task force and carry out shore bombardment of enemy positions. In order to protect against the possibility of Communist Chinese invasion of Nationalist China, Higbee also participated in patrol of Formosa Straits. Returning to the States on 30 June 1953, she entered the Long Beach Yard for a six-month modernization which saw major structural alterations made, including an enlarged Combat Information Center, new height-finding radar, and an improved anti-aircraft battery.

== Peacetime duties ==
The radar picket destroyer's peacetime duty then fell into a pattern of six-month WestPac cruises alternating with upkeep and training out of San Diego. Operating with the 7th Fleet on her WestPac cruises, Higbee visited Australian and South Pacific ports frequently as well as engaging in fleet maneuvers with units of SEATO navies. Her home port was changed to Yokosuka, Japan, on 21 May 1960. From there Higbee continued to cruise in the Pacific and along the China coast to strengthen American force in Asia. After two years duty in Japan, Higbee returned to her new home port, San Francisco, on 4 September 1962. On 1 April 1963 the destroyer entered the shipyard there for a fleet rehabilitation and modernization (FRAM) overhaul designed to improve her fighting capabilities and lengthen her life span as an active member of the fleet. Higbee was redesignated DD-806 on 1 June 1963.

== Vietnam War ==
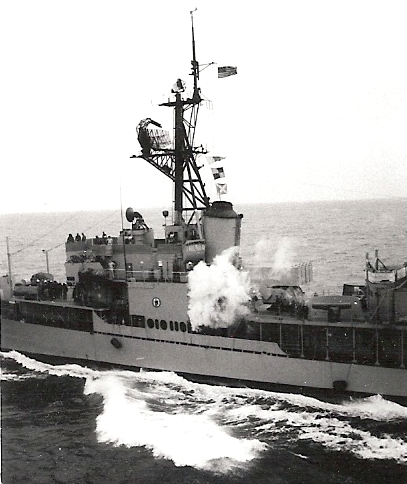
During the Vietnam war years Higbee carried a steam locomotive whistle attached to a main deck steam fitting. The plume of steam marks the location as the whistle is used to salute the USS Chicago following refueling from the cruiser.

Ready for action on 3 January 1964, Higbee trained on the West Coast until departing for Japan on 30 June and reached her new homeport, Yokosuka, on 18 July. During the Gulf of Tonkin Incident in August, the destroyer screened carriers of Task Force 77 (TF 77) in the South China Sea. In February 1965 Higbee supported the 9th Marine Brigade at Da Nang, Vietnam. In May she participated in Project Gemini recovery in the Western Pacific. On 1 September Higbee helped to rescue the crew from Arsinoe after the French tanker had grounded off Scarborough Shoals in the South China Sea. The remainder of September was spent in naval gunfire support off South Vietnam. On the return voyage to home port, the ship saw short duty as Station Ship Hong Kong. While in Hong Kong, Princess Margaret was piped aboard the ship.

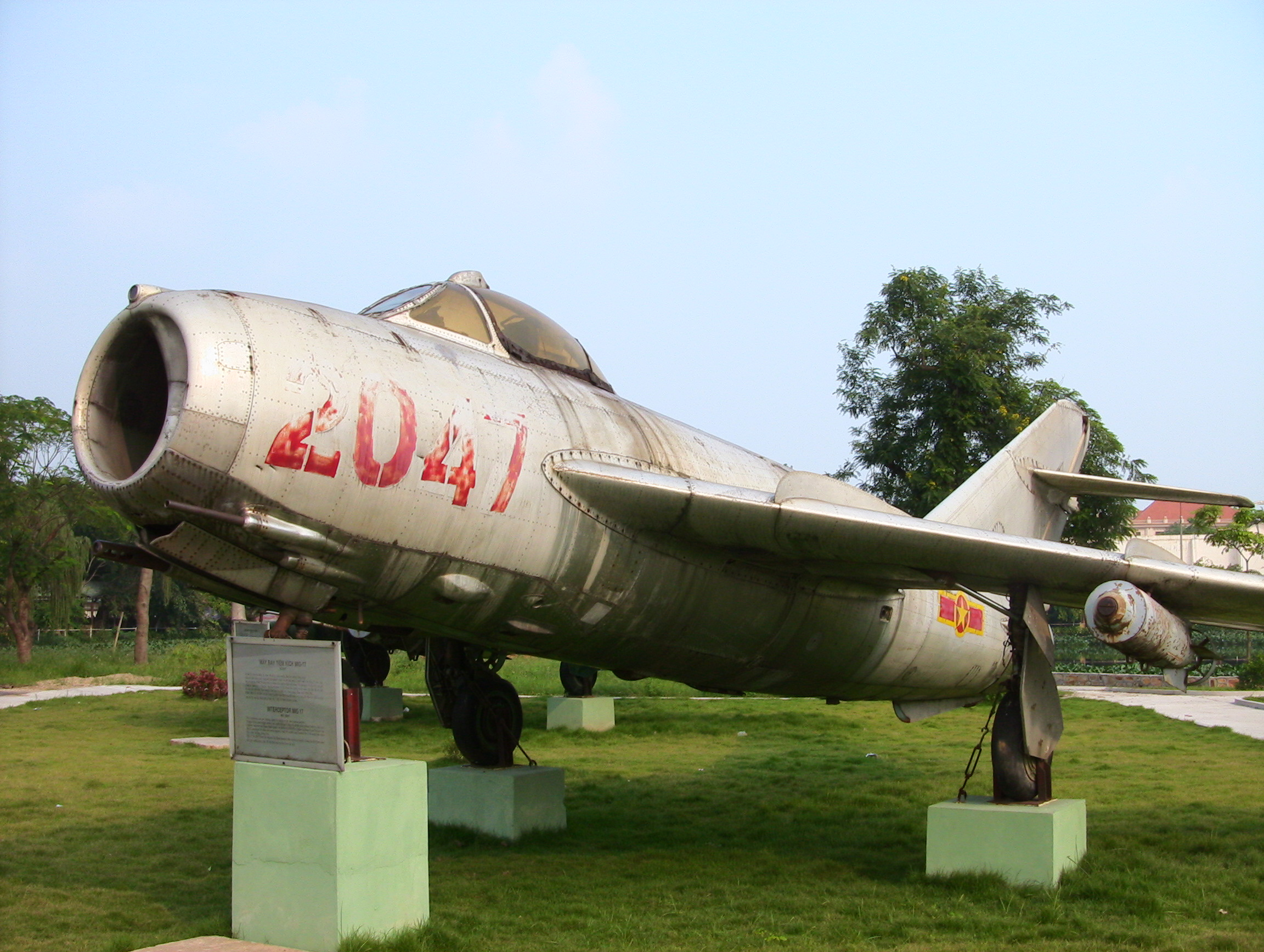
The MiG-17 flown by Nguyen Van Bay B in the attack on Higbee, 19 April 1972.

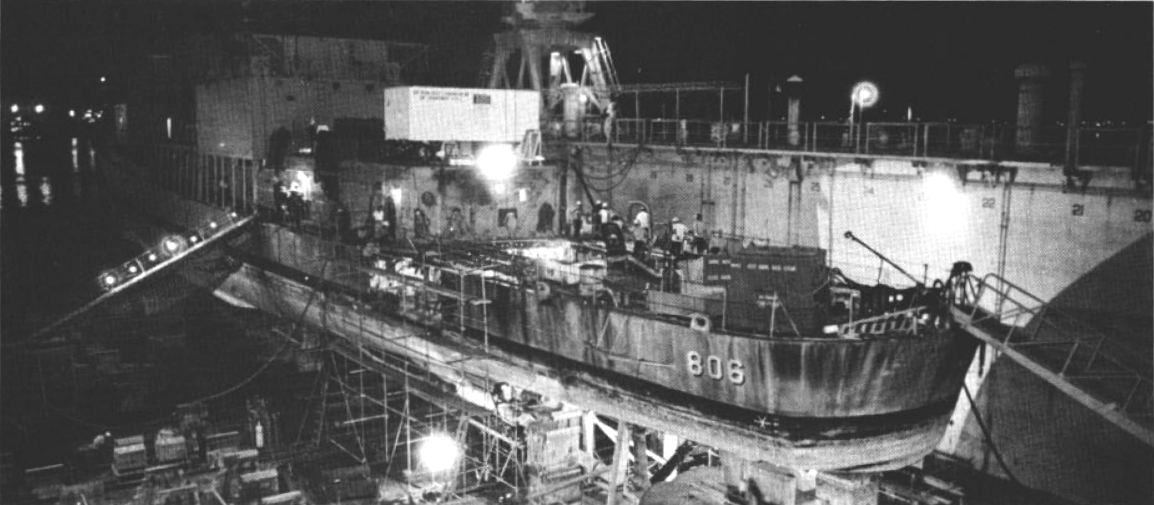
Higbee under repair at Subic bay following her bomb hit

While operating northeast of Luzon in late January 1966, Higbee sighted the Soviet hydrographic ship Gidrifon. Returning to South Vietnam in April, Higbee bombarded enemy positions near Cape St. Jacques and the mouth of the Saigon River. On 17 June she departed Yokosuka for the West Coast, arrived Long Beach, her new home port, on 2 July and operated out of there into 1967. In November 1966, Higbee and her squadron had R&R in Acapulco, Mexico, where Bob Hope did an unscheduled servicemen's show for the crews. The first half of 1967 was spent in the yards at Mare Island for a major refit before returning to the Vietnam theater. On 19 April 1972 Higbee became the first US warship to be bombed during the Vietnam War, when two VPAF (also known as the NVAF-North Vietnamese Air Force) MiG-17s from the 923rd Fighter Regiment attacked, one of which, piloted by Le Xuan Di, dropped a 250 kilogram (500 lb) bomb onto Higbee's rear 5-inch gun mount, destroying it.

The 5-inch gun crew had been outside their turret, due to a misfire within the mount, when the air attack occurred, which resulted in the wounding of four US sailors. The second MiG-17 flown by Nguyen Van Bay B (the "B" to differentiate from the more famous ace pilot Nguyen Van Bay) went on to bomb the light cruiser USS Oklahoma City, causing only minor damage. Higbee was repaired at Subic Bay in the Philippines, with the wrecked gun mount removed, to be replaced later and the structural damage repaired.

Although there were no official aircraft losses reported by either side during the aerial attack, witnesses aboard accompanying USN vessel's deploying defensive measures, claimed one of the attacking MiGs with a hit by a surface-to-air missile fired from the cruiser USS Sterett. (Note: Photos taken by one of Sterett's crew clearly show the MIG being destroyed by a Terrier missile. Eyewitnesses saw a MiG aircraft blown to pieces by a direct Terrier missile strike at only a few thousand yards. Pieces of the virtually disintegrated MiG fell into the sea in view of the eyewitnesses (Commander Destroyer Squadron Nine staff).)

== Post-war fate ==
Higbee's first peacetime duty was as a member of Destroyer Squadron 27 homeported in Long Beach, California. Her later years (after May, 1975) were spent as a Naval Reserve Force destroyer homeported in Long Beach, CA and Seattle, WA, as a unit of DesRon 37. In 1978 Higbee had the highest score for NGFS (Naval Gunfire Support) of any ship in the US Navy and was featured in Surface Warfare magazine for this distinction. Higbee was decommissioned and struck from the Navy list on 15 July 1979. Higbee was sunk as a target on 24 April 1986, around 130 nmi (240 km; 150 mi) west of San Diego at 32°28′0.4″N 119°58′0.7″W.

One of her anchors is on display outside of Naval Station Mayport's medical building.

== Honors ==
Higbee earned one battle star for her service in World War II and seven battle stars for her service in the Korean War.

== See also ==
- USS Lenah Sutcliffe Higbee, also named for Lenah Higbee.
