= VV03 =

VV03 may refer to:

- Kien An Airport, an airport in Haiphong, Vietnam, with ICAO code VV03
- Vega flight VV03, the 3rd Vega launch that occurred on 30 April 2014
