= Nguyễn Văn Bảy =

Vietnamese jet fighter ace

Hero of the People's Armed Forces Nguyễn Văn Bảy
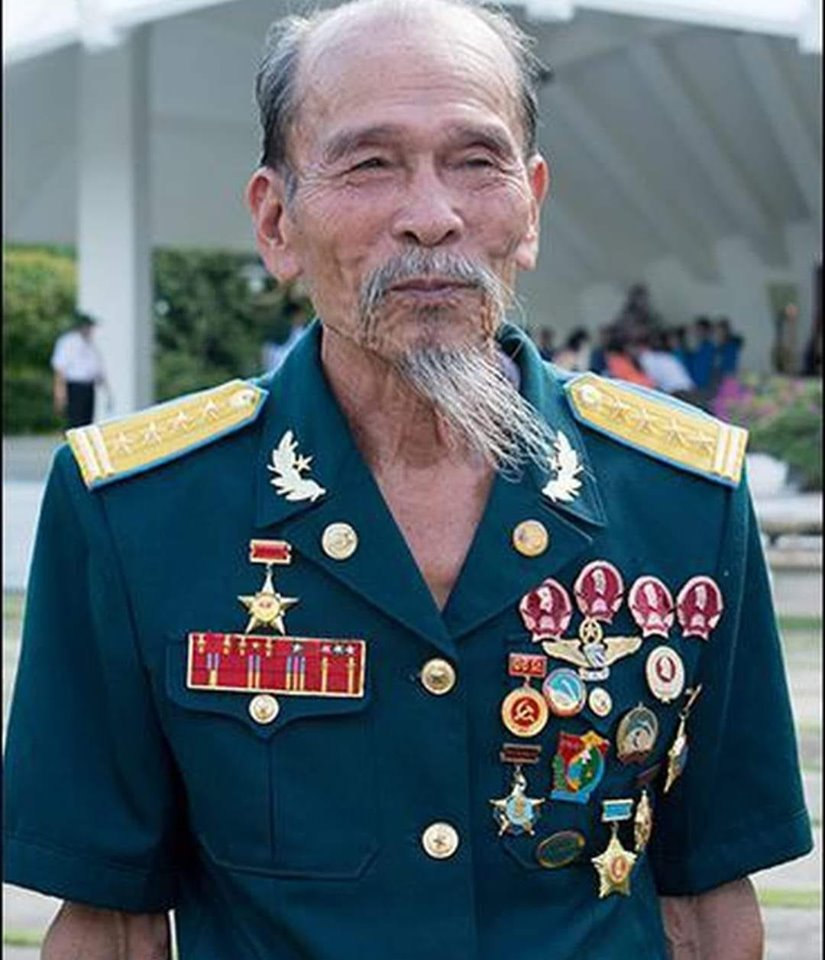
- Colonel Nguyễn Văn Bảy
- Born: February 2, 1936; Dong Thap, Vietnam
- Died: September 22, 2019 (aged 83); Ho Chi Minh City, Vietnam
- Military career
- Allegiance: (North Vietnam) Democratic Republic of Vietnam
- Branch: Vietnam People's Air Force (previously North Vietnamese Air Force)
- Service years: 1966–1972
- Rank: Colonel
- Unit: 923rd Fighter Regiment
- Conflicts: Vietnam War
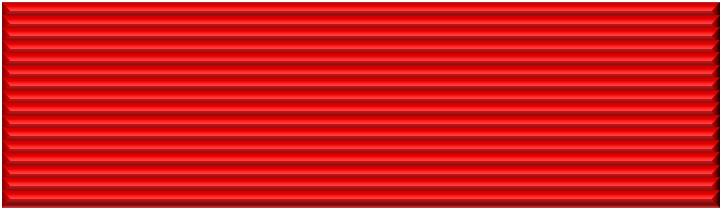
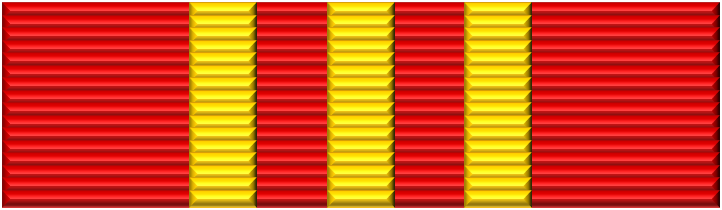
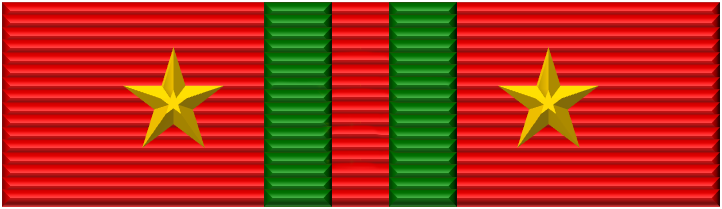
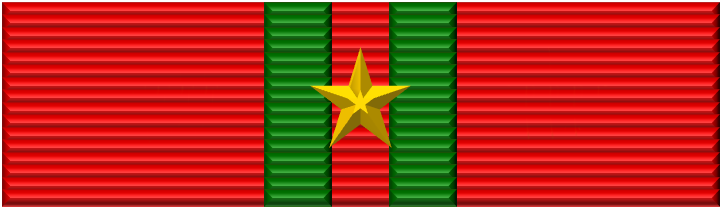
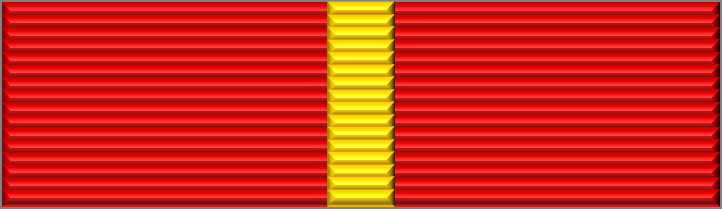
- Awards: Hero of the People's Armed Forces; Order of Ho Chi Minh; Feat Order Second Class; Feat Order Third Class; Medal of Glorious Warrior Third Class

Nguyễn Văn Bảy (Note: In this Vietnamese name, the surname is Nguyễn, but is often simplified to Nguyen in English-language text. In accordance with Vietnamese custom, this person should be referred to by the given name, Bảy.) (born on February 2, 1936 – September 22, 2019), was a Vietnamese jet fighter ace for the Vietnam People's Air Force (North Vietnamese Air Force) during the Vietnam War. Piloting a MiG-17F while assigned to the 923rd Fighter Regiment, Bảy claimed 7 aerial combat victories while engaged against aircraft of the USAF and USN: 2 F-8s, 1 F-4B, 1 A-4C and 1 F-105D. Of the 7 claimed victories, 5 are acknowledged by American documents. Of 16 VPAF (North Vietnamese) aces during Vietnam War, only Bảy, Lưu Huy Chao, and Le Hai solely flew MiG-17s. He authored the famous saying "In Vietnam, you meet heroes wherever you go".

== Background ==
Bảy was born in 1937 in present-day Sa Đéc City, Đồng Tháp Province. He was the seventh of 11 children. At the age of 16, Bảy went North to join the army to fight against the French during the First Indochina War (aka the French Indochina War). When the war ended in 1954, Vietnam was temporarily divided into two states along the 17th Parallel; North Vietnam and South Vietnam. Bảy chose to stay in the North, at which time he lost all contact with his family.

In 1962, Bảy volunteered for flight training and was among the first pilot trainees sent to train in the People's Republic of China. As he told it, he "went from the bicycle to the airplane with no stop in between." He learned to drive a car only long after he began flight training. Bảy and the other trainees started with Yak-18s, then moved on to MiG-15s, finally graduating to the MiG-17s. Similar to U.S. pilots, the North Vietnamese usually flew 200 hours in training before going into combat. Bảy's training took four years, successfully completing his training in January 1966.

== Vietnam People's Air force ==
Bảy began his combat aviation career with the 910th Air Training Regiment in Vietnam in 1959, and started MiG-17 training in China in the early 1960s. Bảy returned to Vietnam for combat duty with the 921st Fighter Regiment, but scored his first aerial victory with the 923rd Fighter Regiment in April 1966 during the early part of the U.S.-involved Vietnam War; Bảy was awarded the coveted Hero of the Vietnamese People's Armed Forces medal on 1 January 1967.

Note: The following aerial engagements do not match with the number of aircraft he shot down, according to the United States Air Force. The aircraft he shot down as claimed by the USAF are 2 F-8s, 1 F-4B, 1 A-4C and 1 F-105D. In addition, the following engagements suggest that he shot down 8 aircraft even though he is credited with 7. Nevertheless, the following aerial-combat victories listed, at the very least, include all the kills acknowledged and credited to Nguyễn Văn Bảy by the VPAF:

=== October 6, 1965 ===
Bảy had his first engagement when he was attacked by an F-4 Phantom. The F-4 fired an AIM-7D missile that detonated off his left wing. His MiG-17 then pitched down and started vibrating. Bảy managed to land safely at Noi Bai airfield, just north of Hanoi. He later stated, "I felt like a light boxer who confidently walked up to the ring and tried to knock out the super heavy boxers. It was not a single fight but dozens of dogfights. We were outnumbered four or five to one. Our thoughts were on survival, nothing more."

=== April 26, 1966 ===
USAF F-4C Phantom IIs participated in a strike along Route 10 at Bắc Sơn-Bình Gia, and a flight of four MiG-17s that included pilot Nguyễn Văn Bảy were directed by North Vietnamese ground control intercept radar (GCI) to fly at 2,500 meters and 15 km south of Bac Son-Binh Gia; due to the constant shifting of direction of flight by the U.S. aircraft, the MiG-17 pilots decided engaged the American raiders head-on, and in the ensuing melee, Lưu Huy Chao claimed a Phantom shot-down, while Nguyễn Văn Bảy scored hits on another Phantom, damaging it for certain, but couldn't confirm it as a kill.

=== April 29, 1966 ===
On 29 April 1966, North Vietnamese GCI directed the 923rd Fighter Regiment MiGs into two separate battles against USAF and USN aircraft. A pilot of one flight of MiG-17s from the 923rd regiment, Bui Dinh Kinh claimed the downing of a USAF A-1E Skyraider piloted by Col. Leo "Sid" Boston; although some sources may have misidentified the loss as a USN A-4E Skyhawk piloted by navy Captain (same rank as air force Colonel) L.S. Boston. In the other interception flight of the 923rd regiment MiG-17s that day, Nguyễn Văn Bảy intercepted USAF F-105s and F-4s, shooting down the F-105D Thunderchief piloted by Lt. Donald W. Bruch of the 333rd TFS, just north of Hanoi, although the US-side claims this loss was due to AAA; Lt. Bruch according to witnesses, was not seen to eject from his stricken aircraft, and was declared KIA on 4 May 1966.

=== June 21, 1966 ===
Bảy and three other MiG-17s were sent to engage an RF-8A (reconnaissance variant) and its escorting F-8s. Despite two Migs being destroyed by the F-8s, Bảy managed to down one F-8 piloted by Cole Black. While Bảy and the other MiG-17s were engaging the F-8s, the lead Mig-17, piloted by Phan Thanh Trung, shot down the RF-8A.

=== June 29, 1966 ===
Bảy and three other MiG-17s were sent to engage F-105s heading for the fuel depots in Hanoi. With the help of fellow pilot Phan Van Tuc, catching the lead F-105 off-guard, Bảy shot it down. The F-105D that was downed in this engagement between Nguyen and Phan, was piloted by Capt. M.N. Jones, who then spent 2,420 days at the prison camp often referred to as the "Hanoi Hilton", although as typical of American sources, the counter-claim is that Jones was shot down due to "fire from rockets and anti-aircraft cannons". According to another source, Bảy shot down ace pilot James H. Kasler.

=== September 5, 1966 ===
Le Thanh Chon, the senior control officer at Gia Lam airfield, vectored Bảy and his wing-man Vo Van Man to an unknown target in the South. As they headed south, Bảy observed a flight of A-4 Skyhawks flying away from a smoking bridge. To his front, he observed two F-8 Crusaders approaching the A-4s from the right of where he was heading. Bảy and his wingman jettisoned their drop tanks in preparation for battle. The F-8s took position behind the A-4s to escort them from the bridge. Chon, watching the events on radar ordered Bảy to fly forward, Bảy was then given permission to engage, at which time he attacked the trailing F-8, adjusting his fire on the tracers. As his rounds struck near the canopy of the F-8, the plane began coming apart, Crusader pieces filled the air as Bảy's MiG started to fly through them. Avoiding the danger, he pulled away, at the same time observing the pilot ejecting from his aircraft. The engagement lasted approximately 45 seconds, and when he landed, Plexiglas from the F-8 was found in his engine intake. The American F-8 pilot was captured shortly after ejecting, and turned out to be Wilfred K. Abbott, serving in the squadron VF-111, carrier USS Oriskany.

=== September 16, 1966 ===
In the early afternoon at Gia Lam airfield, Bảy was flying in the number three position in a flight of four, when they were directed to engage US aircraft. Bảy was the first to observe a flight of F-4s, and asked his flight leader, Ho Van Quy, for permission to attack, but Quy doubted they could catch up to the faster F-4s. Then Bảy spotted an opportunity, the Phantoms began to make a climbing turn. Bảy and his flight commenced to cut off the F-4s, he rolled in behind the F-4C piloted by Major John "Robbie" Robertson and his backseater Hubert Buchanan (USAF # 63–7643, 555th TFS). As he closed the range he opened fire with his cannons. The F-4 pulled hard and then eased its turn. Bảy adjusted and fired again, this time observing one of the F-4's wheels flying off of its wing. Buchanan ejected and was captured as POW, while Robertson is believed to have died in the wreck of their F-4 Phantom.

=== September 21, 1966 ===
On this date, Bảy was flying the lead of a four-ship flight, when he was directed to a target 10 miles ahead by ground control. After a few minutes, Bảy spotted two F-105s at around 10,000 to 13,000 feet. Bảy banked in pursuit, knowing that F-105s normally traveled in packs of four, he looked around for the other pair. Not able to locate the other F-105s, Bảy gave his wing-man, Do Huy Hoang, permission to attack. Hoang flew wide to the left, and lined up behind the second F-105. Hoang waited for the "Thuds" to turn, but instead they rolled into a shallow bank. Bảy's flight had flown into an ambush. Flying low to avoid radar behind the first F-105s were First Lieutenant Karl Richter and Captain Ralph J. Beardsley. Richter jettisoned his rocket pods and lined up behind Hoang. Richter fired his M61 Gatling gun on Hoang. The airplane rolled on its own to wings level. Hoang lit the afterburner on his MiG and tried to regain control as his jet rolled to the right. Hoang's left wing was in tatters from Richter's Gatling Gun. Hoang checked his engine instruments and thought he was going to be fine, but then the plane began to come apart. Hoang had to eject. Bảy, now alone, and with his fuel becoming low, found himself dodging multiple missiles from US aircraft;however, they began to depart North Vietnam's air space. At this time, Bảy spotted Vo Van and followed him back to base.

=== January 21, 1967 ===
On this day at 14:45 hours, GCI directed a flight of four 923 regiment MiG-17s: Ho Van Quy, Phan Thanh Tai, Nguyen Van Bảy and Vo Van Man. Just minutes after takeoff, Nguyen Van Bảy made visual contact with an incoming flight of 20 F-105s and 4 F-4 Phantoms from 10 km away. At this point in time, the U.S. Thunderchiefs and Phantom crews also made visual contact with the VPAF MiGs, and were forced to jettison their bomb loads; the F-4s attacked the MiGs first, without success Ho Van Quy quickly approached a flight of F-105 with an advantageous shooting position at only 500–600 meters from his target F-105, but failed to score a hit. However, Nguyen Van Bảy was able to shoot down the F-105D piloted by Capt. W.R. Wyatt (s/n 62-4278, of the 469th TFS/388th TFW) and claiming his 6th aerial victory, however, after Capt. Wyatt was rescued, US-side claimed the Thunderchief was shot-down by AAA.

=== April 24, 1967 ===
Bảy, assigned as flight leader, was scrambled from Kien An airfield. His flight was to intercept a United States Navy air raid at the Haiphong docks. Bảy closed in on an unsuspecting F-8 Crusader piloted by Lt. Cdr. E.J. Tucker, and shot it down. Tucker ejected but later he died in North Vietnamese captivity. The escorting F-4s then counterattacked Bảy's flight. The F-4s fired several Sidewinders at Bảy, but with his wing-man's warning, he was able to dodge them all. Bảy was then able to maneuver himself into a good shooting position against the crew of the USN F-4B (BuNo 153000) from VF-114, USS Kitty Hawk (CVA-63) piloted by Lcdr. Charles E. Southwick along with RIO Ens. James W. Laing (call sign Linfield 210) and claimed his seventh victory, however, Lcdr. C.E. Southwick and his RIO Ens. J.W. Laing believed that they had been "shot down by AAA" according to some sources, while "running out of fuel" according to others (the North Korean squadron Doan Z claimed an "F-4 shot-down", however the only other loss from U.S. carrier aircraft that day was an A-6A Intruder (BuNo 152589) of VF-85, also from the USS Kitty Hawk, of which the U.S. claims to have been shot-down by AAA; both Lt(jg) L.I. Williams and Lt(jg) M.D. Christian became captured POWs). While both Lcdr. Southwick and Ens. Laing safely ejected out at sea and were rescued on that 24 April 1967 day, they were again shot-down on 14 May 1967, possibly by either MiG-17 ace fighter pilot Vo Van Man, or Nguyen The Hon, both of whom were also shot-down (and KIA) on this day; both U.S. pilot Lcdr. Southwick and RIO Ens. Laing became captured POWs.

=== April 25, 1967 ===
Bảy and his flight were able to bring down two American A-4 Skyhawks. One A-4, BuNo 147799 manned by Lt. C. D. Stackhouse, was shot down by Bảy himself while the other was shot down by his wing-man. Bảy was awarded the Hero's Medal of the Vietnamese People's Army for his outstanding skill and bravery in combat, and for his superb leadership of his flight.

=== April 29, 1967 ===
In the afternoon of this day, Nguyễn Văn Bảy was among a flight of MiG-17s flying out of Hoa Lac on a heading of 120-degrees over to Hoa Binh, where he made visual contact of F-4 Phantoms from 8 km out, and engaging them in three-minutes time from the initial visual identification; he would quickly shoot-down one of the four USAF F-4Cs from the 389th TFS, piloted by Lt. L.H. Torkleson (POW) along with his WSO G.J. Pollin (KIA); the US-side claims the loss of this Phantom due to AAA.

=== Early 1972 ===
It is a common misconception that this Nguyễn Văn Bảy was the pilot who attacked the USS Oklahoma City on April 19, 1972. Rather, it was a different Nguyễn Văn Bảy, or Bảy B, who was downed and killed in Thanh Hoa province on May 6 the same year.

In 1971 Bảy B and his fellow pilot Le Xuan Di were trained in anti-ship warfare by a Cuban advisor. On April 19, 1972, the two men from the 923rd Fighter Regiment flew their MiG-17s, each armed with two 250 kg bombs, towards the open sea in what was known as the Battle of Đồng Hới Le Xuan Di headed his aircraft for the US destroyer USS Higbee, whilst Nguyễn Văn Bảy struck for the US Navy light cruiser USS Oklahoma City, which had been shelling targets in Vinh City.

Bảy's two bombs caused only slight damage to the Oklahoma City, as they may have been "near misses", while Di was able to score a direct hit on the destroyer Higbee's aft 5" (127 mm) gun turret with one of his two 250 kg bombs. This was the first successful air strike made by an enemy jet fighter bomber on a US Navy warship while actively engaged in combat.

The USS Sterett, providing escort for the damaged warship, reportedly destroyed an enemy MiG interceptor. Following the initial attack, the USS Sterett deployed her RIM-2 Terrier missiles and destroyed an SS-N-2 "Styx" surface to surface missile in mid flight. The missiles were thought to have been launched from North Vietnamese patrol boats.

=== Grounding and Post-War Retirement ===
Bảy's victories made headlines in North Vietnam and fame soon followed. He dined regularly with Ho Chi Minh and reportedly, was amongst his favorites. Bảy was grounded sporadically, and then permanently. As is often the practice in many countries, high ranking "Aces" are often grounded during a continuing war, to utilize their attained status to inspire future generations.

After the war, he retired to a life of farming and gardening.

=== Association with the Number 7 ===
Nguyễn Văn Bảy flew the MiG-17, an aircraft that was considered outdated at the time due to its lack of radar and missiles, and its maximum speed of only Mach 0.9. Despite these limitations, through effective tactics, he achieved significant success. Between 1966 and 1967, he flew 94 sorties, engaged in 13 aerial battles, and shot down seven American aircraft, making him the most successful MiG-17 pilot of the Vietnam War. Remarkably, he was never shot down.

After 1967, in accordance with a policy to preserve experienced pilots, Bảy was reassigned to a training role, where he mentored and passed on his combat experience to new generations of Vietnamese pilots.

He often remarked on his frequent encounters with the number seven, noting: "I am the seventh child, joined the army at 17, studied for seven days, skipped seven grades, shot down seven American planes with the MiG-17 seven times, and was awarded the Hero of the People's Armed Forces title in 1967."

== Death ==
On September 16, 2019, Bảy suffered a stroke while gardening at his home in Lai Vung District. He was initially treated at Sa Dec General Hospital (Dong Thap) before being transferred to Military Hospital 175 in Ho Chi Minh City.

He died on September 22, 2019, at 9:00 p.m. at the age of 83. His funeral was attended by thousands, including Politburo member and Secretary of the Ho Chi Minh City Party Committee Nguyễn Thiện Nhân, along with numerous officials and military leaders. In the condolence book, Nhân wrote:

"Deeply mourning Hero of the People's Armed Forces Colonel Nguyễn Văn Bảy, former Deputy Chief of Staff of the Air Force, a 55-year Party member, an officer and patriot who dedicated his life to the independence and freedom of the Fatherland, and a shining example of revolutionary morality for future generations."

Bảy was laid to rest in his hometown in Hau Thanh Hamlet, Tan Duong Commune, Lai Vung district, Đồng Tháp province.

=== Legacy ===
More than ten years before his passing, a street in Nha Trang City, Khanh Hoa Province, was named after him.

== See also ==
- List of Vietnam War flying aces
- Vietnam People's Air Force
