= Sacred Twenty =

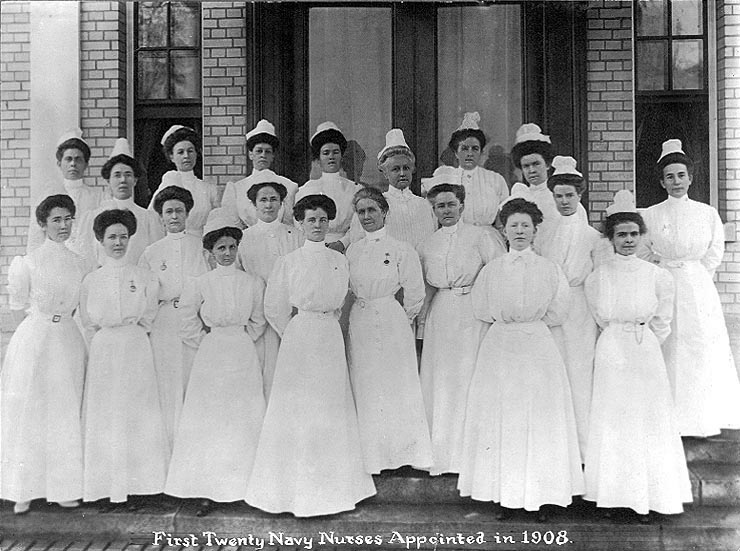
Group photograph of the first twenty Navy Nurses, appointed in 1908

The Sacred Twenty were a group of nurses who were the first female members to ever formally serve in the United States Navy representing the Nurse Corps. Officially formed in 1908, the Sacred Twenty made broad contributions during wartime, not only including training of field nurses and disease treatment, but also providing education programs for nurses abroad and professional publications to the field of nursing.

== History ==
Shortly after the formation of the Army Nurse Corps in 1901, the Navy's Bureau of Medicine and Surgery (BUMED) campaigned to create a similar organization for itself. Congress officially permitted the creation of the organization on 13 May 1908, where twenty women were selected as the first members. The women were required to be between the ages of 22 and 44, to be citizens of the United States, and also could not be married. They were initially headed by Esther Voorhees Hasson, a former member of the Army Nurse Corps, who was appointed as superintendent. Hasson and the Bureau of Medicine and Surgery collaboratively selected the other 19 nurses, who were chosen from various nursing schools and had training across a broad range of nursing skills.

The Sacred Twenty were assigned to the U.S. Naval Hospital in Washington, D.C for initial training and were subsequently assigned to hospitals in Washington, New York City, Norfolk, and Annapolis for supervised duty. Assignments were later expanded to many other cities including Philadelphia and Puget Sound. Overseas, U.S. naval hospitals were built in Guam, Samoa, and the Philippines where some of the Sacred Twenty served.

The navy did not provide room or board for them, and so the nurses rented their own accommodations and provided their own meals. In 1910, Superintendent Hasson noted the dwindling applications from qualified candidates to the Nurse Corps, and subsequently pushed for initiatives such as better pay and reducing the cost of applications by foregoing an in-person interview and replacing it with a written essay requirement. Initially, hospital administration was wary about the idea of introducing female nurses into settings without female patients because they believed they may serve to distract male patients. Consequently, existing male nurses, who had not received sufficient training, performed most of the nursing tasks. Some years after the Sacred Twenty's formation in 1908, however, female nurses began to champion this role in the Hospital Corps, even abroad.

== Service ==
In addition to administering medical care on the battlefield and training of local nurses to do the same, the Sacred Twenty also implemented a number of other programs during their service. For instance, Chief Nurse Elizabeth Leonhardt, who arrived at the Naval Hospital in Guam 1911, not only worked with women and children, but also created a training school for local Chamorro women. Six women attended the first class, which was later expanded due to interest. Later classes included discussion of tuberculosis cases and training and teaching of massage therapy. Some training in midwifery was also implemented by Leonhardt, in part due to her own perceived problems with native approaches to treatment. However, some have noted that these concerns may have been motivated by racial- and gender-based discrimination towards women in the tropics.

Chief Nurse Beatrice Bowman, who arrived in 1916, also taught courses in midwifery and practical nursing, which later allowed trained nurses to provide more complete healthcare to the villages they were assigned to. Later, when Bowman became Superintendent, she implemented mandatory inspections of all naval hospitals in order to create a more consistent standard of nursing and to gain firsthand experience of what challenges different hospitals and nurses faced. Bowman is also noted to have pushed for Navy nurses to continue their education and keep up-to-date with developments in medicine by taking postgraduate courses.

Superintendent Lenah Higbee focused on publicizing and enhancing the reputation of the Nurse Corps. She often published articles in professional journals such as the American Journal of Nursing and encouraged nurses to contribute as well.

== Members ==
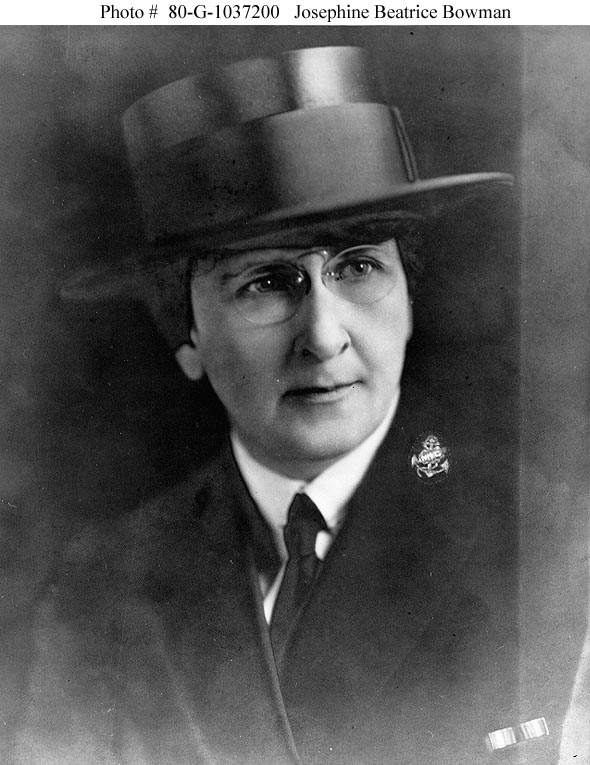
Josephine Beatrice Bowman, third superintendent of the United States Navy Nurse Corps

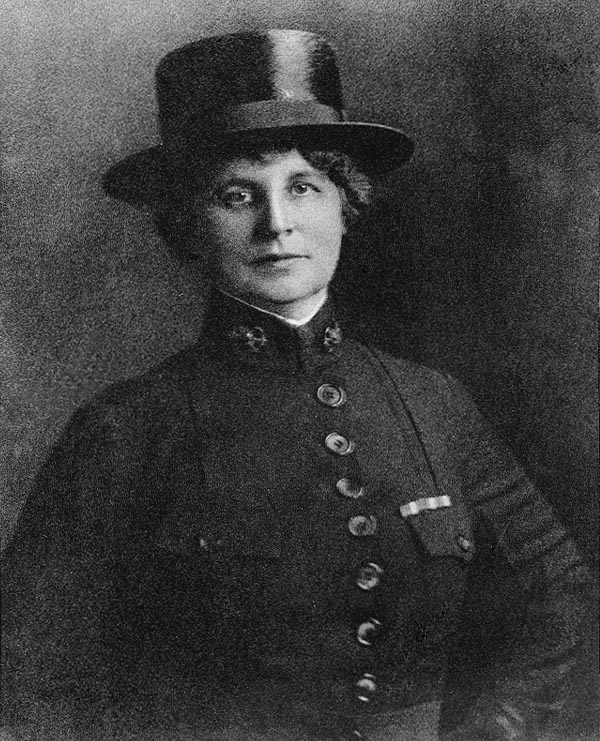
Lenah Higbee, second superintendent of the United States Navy Nurse Corps

The Sacred Twenty included three Nurse Corps Superintendents and twelve chief nurses. They were:

1. Josephine Beatrice Bowman, the third Superintendent of the Navy Nurse Corps, 1922–1935
2. Sara M. Cox
3. Clare L. De Ceu
4. Mary H. Du Bose
5. Estelle Hine
6. Elizabeth M. Hewitt
7. Esther Voorhees Hasson, the first Superintendent of the Navy Nurse Corps, 1908–1911;
8. Lenah H. Sutcliffe Higbee, the second Superintendent of the Navy Nurse Corps, 1911–1922;
9. Della V. Knight
10. Elizabeth Leonhardt
11. Florence T. Milburn
12. Margaret D. Murray
13. Sara B. Myer
14. Ethel R. Parsons
15. Adah M. Pendleton
16. Martha E. Pringle
17. Isabelle Rose Roy
18. Boniface T. Small
19. Victoria White
20. Elizabeth J. Wells
