= Sarah Cox (disambiguation) =

Sarah Cox is a British civil servant.

Sarah Cox may also refer to:

- Sarah Wentworth (née Cox; 1805–1880), who brought Australia's first breach of promise suit and married statesman William Wentworth

== See also ==
- Sara Cox (disambiguation)
