= Luu Huy Chao =

North Vietnamese flying ace of the Vietnam War (born 1936)

- Lưu Huy Chao
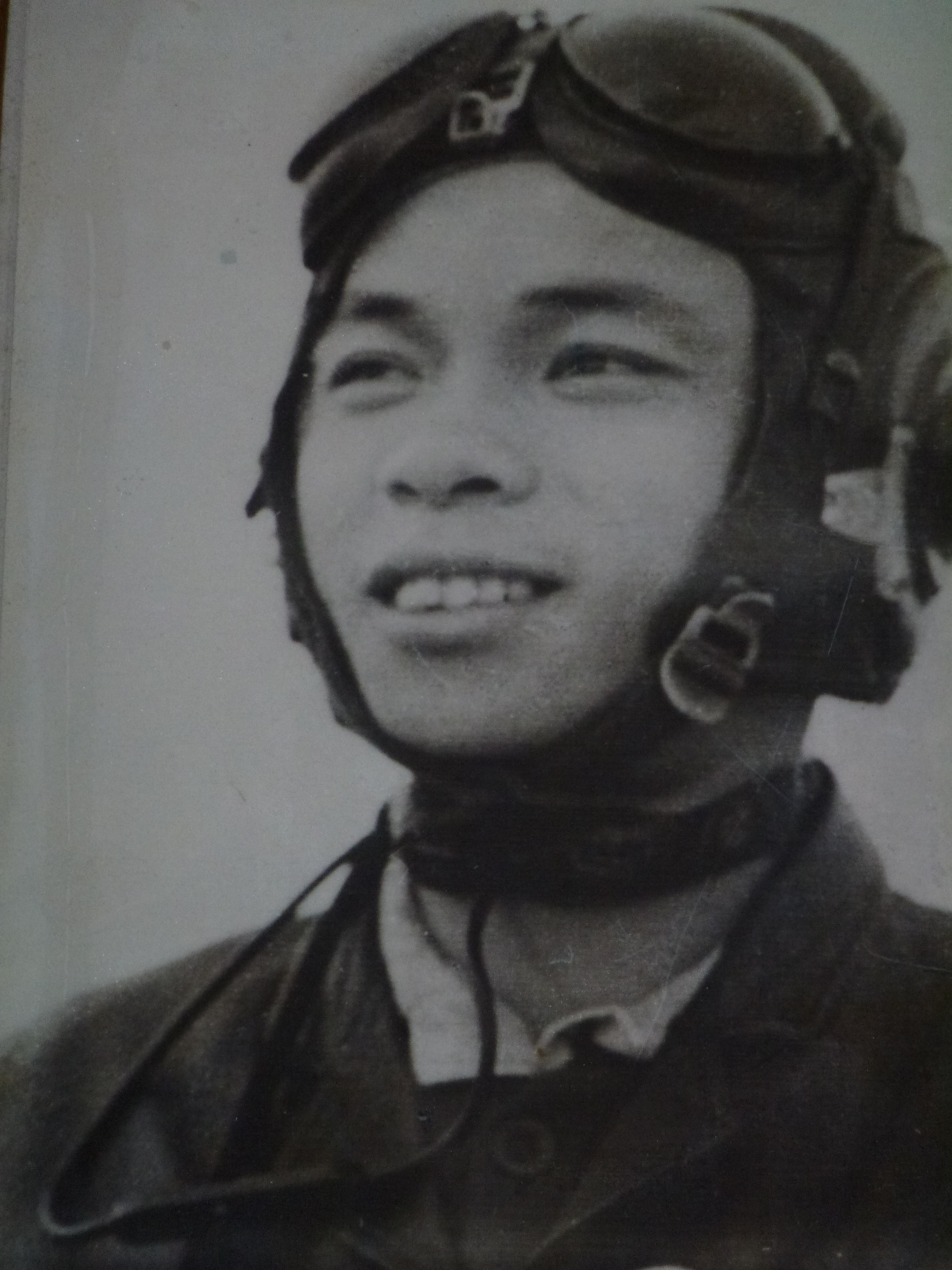
- Luu Huy Chao
- Born: 1936 (age 89–90); Thanh Hóa, French Indochina
- Military career
- Allegiance: (North Vietnam) Democratic Republic of Vietnam
- Branch: Vietnam People's Air Force (North Vietnamese Air Force)
- Unit: 923rd Fighter Regiment
- Conflicts: Vietnam War

Luu Huy Chao (born 1936); (Vietnamese: Lưu Huy Chao) is a former pilot of the Vietnam People's Air Force and a Vietnam War flying ace. From 1966 until 1968, Lưu Huy Chao flew a Mikoyan-Gurevich MiG-17 "Fresco" with the 923rd Fighter Regiment against the United States Air Force, during which time he was credited with six air victories. Luu Huy Chao was one of three pilots who flew MiG 17 aircraft to be confirmed by the US as aces. The pilots were Luu Huy Chao, Le Hai and Nguyễn Văn Bảy.

== Early life ==
Chao was born in Thanh Hóa province in Vietnam in 1936. He was accepted into the Vietnam People's Air Force in 1957, and was sent to the People's Republic of China in 1959 for six years of training. After his return to North Vietnam in 1965, Chao flew a MiG-17 against the United States Air Force. In February 1966, Chao shot down a C-47 carrying South Vietnamese infiltrators.
