= Hubert Buchanan =

American pilot

Hubert E. Buchanan
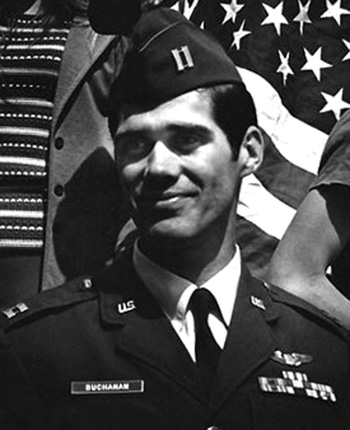
- Buchanan in 1973 in Austin, Indiana, after being released from captivity
- Born: Hubert Elliot Buchanan; April 24, 1941 (age 85); Scottsburg, Indiana, U.S.
- Occupations: Fighter Pilot, Airline Pilot
- Spouse: Lauren Buchanan
- Children: Ashley; Jennifer; Lindsay; Christopher
- Military career
- Allegiance: United States of America
- Branch: United States Air Force
- Service years: 1964–1973
- Rank: Captain
- Conflicts: Vietnam War
- Awards: Silver Star (2); Legion of Merit; Bronze Star (w/ "V" device); Purple Heart (2); Air Medal (2); Prisoner of War Medal

Hubert E. Buchanan (born April 24, 1941) is a former United States Air Force captain and fighter pilot in the Vietnam War who was shot down, captured, and spent 2,362 days as a prisoner of war in Hanoi and surrounding areas. He was one of the first American POWs to return to Vietnam after the war, and visited the man credited with his capture.

== Early life ==
Buchanan was born in Scottsburg, Indiana, to Mary and Hubert Buchanan. He graduated from Duquesne University in Pittsburgh, Pennsylvania.

== Military service ==
Buchanan entered Officer Training School on February 14, 1964, earning his commission as a second lieutenant in the U.S. Air Force at Lackland Air Force Base, Texas, on May 12, 1964. Buchanan next attended Undergraduate Pilot Training and was awarded his pilot wings at Laredo Air Force Base, Texas, in June 1965, followed by Pilot Systems Operator Training and F-4 Phantom II Combat Crew Training from June to December 1965. His next assignment was as an F-4 Pilot Systems Operator with the 16th Tactical Fighter Squadron at Eglin Air Force Base, Florida, from December 1965 to August 1966, followed by service as an F-4 Pilot Systems Operator with the 555th Tactical Fighter Squadron at Ubon Royal Thai Air Force Base, Thailand, from August 1966.

=== Dogfight and Ejection ===
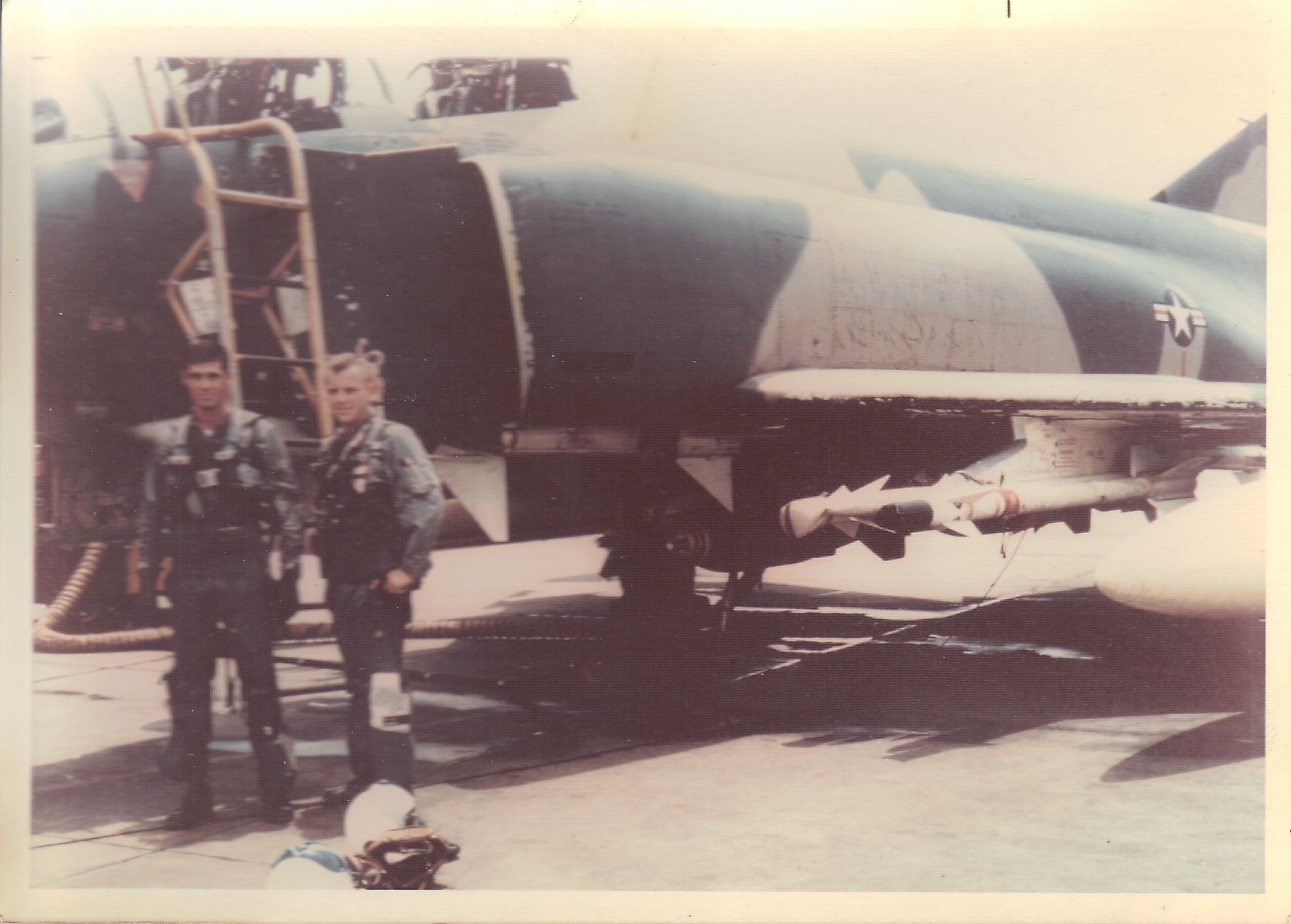
Hubert Buchanan (left) and John Robertson (right) with their F-4 Phantom II

On 16 September 1966, Major John L. "Robbie" Robertson, pilot, and then-First Lieutenant Buchanan, weapons systems operator, comprised the crew of the #3 aircraft (F-4C-20-MC, s/n 63-7643) in a flight of four, call sign "Moonglow 3". This was Major Robertson's 29th day in Southeast Asia and 1st Lt. Buchanan's 17th mission. The flight departed Ubon at 15:00 hours to conduct an armed reconnaissance mission against the Dap Cau Railroad and Highway Bridge located approximately 17 miles (27 km) southeast of Kép Air Base, between the major cities of Hanoi and Haiphong, North Vietnam. Shortly after the flight departed Ubon, one of the Phantoms developed fuel problems and was forced to return to base. The rest of the flight continued with their mission.

At 15:40, Moonglow flight was nearing their target when they were engaged in aerial combat by a flight of four MiG-17s. The Phantoms jettisoned their external ordinance before engaging the enemy fighters. As the dogfight progressed, Roscoe Epperson, a good friend of Major Robertson who was flying an air cover for another mission, recognized Robbie Robertson's voice over the radio and listened to the transmissions of the air battle. He heard Major Robertson state, "This is Moonglow 3, I see the MiGs. I am engaging MiGs!" He heard the entire battle from sighting the enemy aircraft through the dogfight. He also heard his friend report, "I am hit, and I'm heading for the water!" In the chaos of battle, no parachutes were seen and no emergency radio beepers were heard. Because of the location being deep within enemy-held territory, no search and rescue (SAR) operation was possible. At the time of loss both Robbie Robertson and Hugh Buchanan were listed missing in action.

Moonglow flight had been jumped by a flight of four MiG-17s that launched from Gia Lam Air Base on the northeast edge of Hanoi. The #3 MiG was flown by North Vietnamese ace Nguyễn Văn Bảy, who was credited with seven kills by the end of the war. In a 1997 meeting between the North Vietnamese pilot and Ralph Wetterhahn, another friend of Robbie Robertson who was also assigned to this strike mission and flying in another flight of F4C aircraft from the 555 TFS, the following information was established. The MiGs were scrambled early in the afternoon. Nguyen Van Bay was the first one to spot the American flight far ahead of them. He asked permission to attack the Phantoms. The MiG's flight leader gave permission to give chase, but expressed doubt that they could catch the much faster American aircraft. As the MiG-17s moved toward the Phantoms, Nguyễn Văn Bảy saw Moonglow 3 initiate a climbing left turn. That turning maneuver allowed the MiG pilot to cut the diameter of the circle and close the distance between the opposing aircraft to 100 to 150 meters (330 to 490 ft) to achieve an appropriate angle of attack. Nguyễn Văn Bảy aimed, then fired his 37mm and 23mm cannons at the Phantom.

Buchanan reported to Robertson, "This guy's pulling right in on us. He's going to shoot any time now." At that moment a salvo of orange golf ball-size rounds passed over Moonglow 3's canopies. Robbie Robertson pulled hard on the stick, then eased his turn. Hugh Buchanan saw the MiG close again. He said, "This is going to be it. He's corrected the problem."

Nguyễn Văn Bảy lined up, fired again and saw a wheel come out from beneath the F4's wing and sail past his canopy. For 1st Lt. Buchanan everything went black. According to the WSO, "It could have been from so many G forces pulling the blood away from my eyes, I'm not sure. My helmet was bouncing around - I really don't have a clear memory of ejecting, however, I do sort of have a dream - I can kind of imagine pulling the handle the F4 had between your legs." He went on to say, "I also ejected so I must have done it. I could hear loud booms, like the canopy blowing off. And I felt the wind. The next thing I knew, my parachute was opening. When I got down low, I could see people running around on the ground in a little village. I could see a guy off to the right. He looked like he had a uniform on and a rifle and he was running in my direction."

Nguyễn Văn Bảy sped away from the burning Phantom, then rolled back to take a look. He watched the aircraft pitch down in flames. He made a note of seeing one parachute as he turned his attention to the remaining US aircraft. Later that day, the Foreign Broadcast Information Service in Okinawa translated a Hanoi broadcast that announced the downing of two US aircraft in the area where Moonglow 3 was lost. About a month later, Radio Hanoi announced the names of three captured Americans, one of whom was Hubert Buchanan. At that time Buchanan's status was updated from "Missing in Action" to Prisoner of War.

=== Capture ===
Buchanan ejected over the Red River Delta and landed in a small village where approximately 100 villagers awaited and quickly disarmed him. While some villagers were armed with rifles and machetes, most were unarmed and even fetched Buchanan drinking water. A farmer named Le Cong Su was officially credited by the North Vietnamese government for Buchanan's capture. After hours of holding Buchanan in the village, a political officer arrived to collect Buchanan from the villagers. The political officer roused the crowd to become angry and paraded Buchanan around through many villages encouraging people to be violent with him, some tried to kill him.

After several hours, Buchanan was taken to Hanoi's Hỏa Lò Prison also known as the "Hanoi Hilton."

=== Prisoner of War ===
Upon arrival at the prison camp, Buchanan was taken into interrogation where political officers attempted to solicit classified information regarding future air strike targets. Interrogators used torture to extract information, but Buchanan resisted. He later remarked that his initial interrogation was remarkably similar to conditions for which he was prepared in the Air Force SERE program.

I arrived at the prison camp and they took me in for interrogation, I almost laughed because it was an exact copy of survival school's interrogation office. The only difference was a picture of Ho Chi Minh instead of Lenin. A short stool to sit on, a blue cloth over a desk, it was completely the same.

— Hubert Buchanan, August 9, 2014,

Initially, Buchanan was regularly subjected to various forms of torture and beatings in attempts to elicit military secrets. Buchanan spent the first six months of captivity in solitary confinement.

Buchanan was later awarded the Silver Star (second award), Legion of Merit, and Bronze Star medals for resisting the demands of his captors in the face of "harassment, intimidation, crulties... and torture"

== Post-war return to Vietnam ==
In December 1991, Japanese television company Mirai, USA offered to send Buchanan back to Vietnam as part of an ongoing series about MIAs.

The sun is setting over the hills of Cong Hoa village. Buchanan arrives in an Army Jeep bearing photographs of his four children and stuffed animals, chewing gum and candy for a new generation of Vietnamese children. But the old generation is there, too, giving him a warm welcome.

"As we drove up, it was 4 p.m.," Buchanan says. "The day I was captured, I hit the ground just about 4 p.m. It was totally unplanned. It just happened that way. The whole village was there. It looked just about like it did 25 years ago. The scenery was remarkably unchanged.

"Some guy came walking up wearing a Boston Red Sox hat. . . . I said: 'Wait a minute. I got to get a picture next to this guy.' He had no idea of what the hat said. But it's so ironic to be there in this place halfway around the world with a guy standing there wearing a Boston Red Sox hat."

He and the villagers laugh a lot when a Japanese television crew photographs him with Le Cong Su, his capturer.

Su was on the lower side of a hill, which made him look even smaller. "Wait a minute," Buchanan yells. "Put him on the high side. He's supposed to look real fierce. He captured me.

"Come over here," Buchanan shouts. "You're supposed to be big and fierce because you captured me."

Buchanan spends two hours in the village. The shadows signal it is time to leave. Su doesn't want the evening to end. "You can stay with me and we'll get a chicken and get something to drink," he tells Buchanan through an interpreter. "We can talk more."

— George Esper, "Healing War's Wounds: Today, Veterans Return to Vietnam to Find the Enemy Gone", Los Angeles Times
