= USS Lenah Sutcliffe Higbee =

US Navy guided-missile destroyer

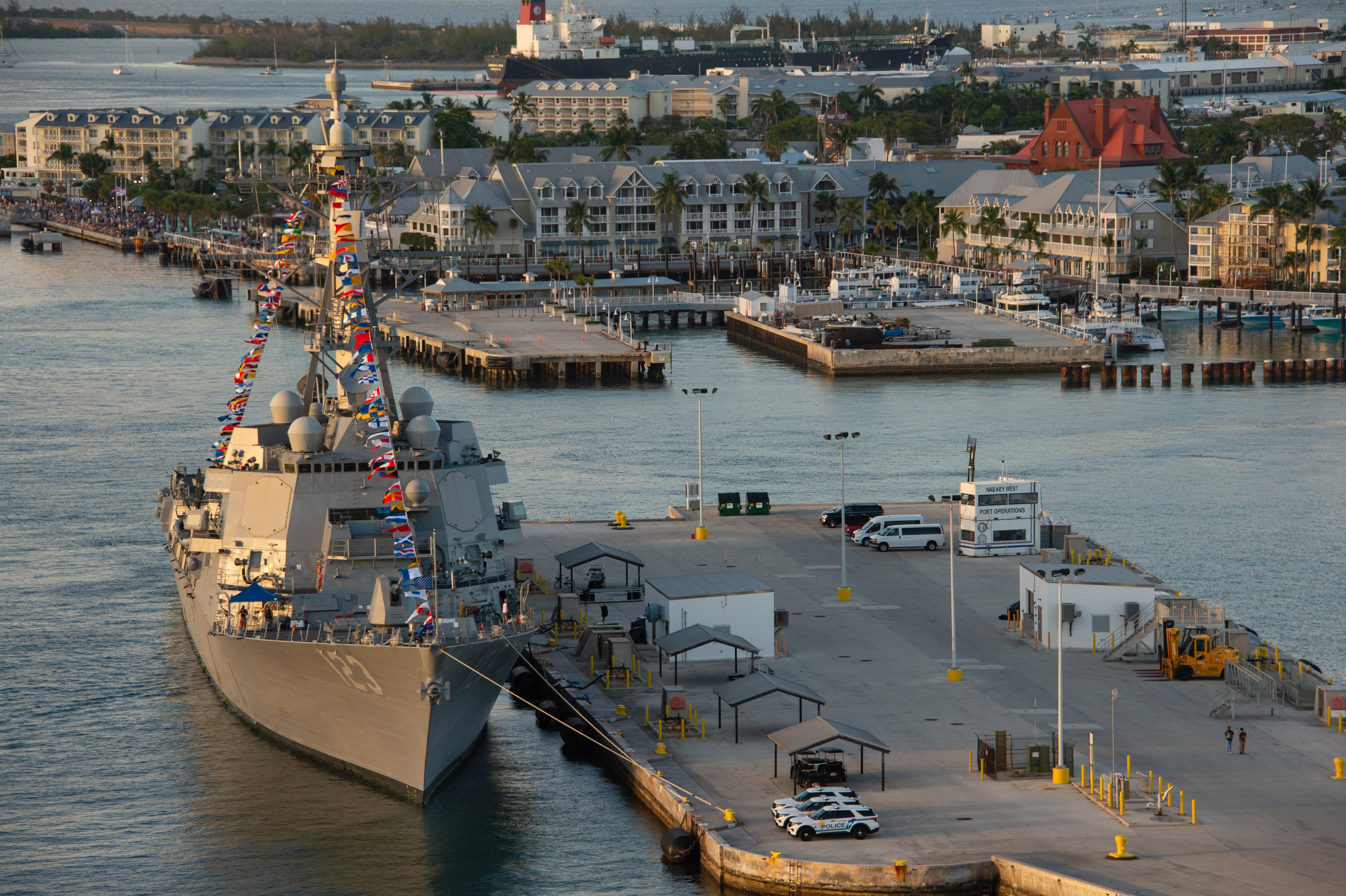
- USS Lenah Sutcliffe Higbee on 8 May 2023

History

United States
- Name: Lenah Sutcliffe Higbee
- Namesake: Lenah Higbee
- Awarded: 3 June 2013
- Builder: Ingalls Shipbuilding
- Laid down: 14 November 2017
- Launched: 27 January 2020
- Sponsored by: Louisa Dixon; Virginia Munford; Rolanda Pickett Wilson
- Christened: 24 April 2021
- Acquired: 30 November 2022
- Commissioned: 13 May 2023
- Home port: San Diego
- Identification: Hull number: DDG-123
- Motto: Bellatrix illa, "She Is a Warrior"
- Status: in active service
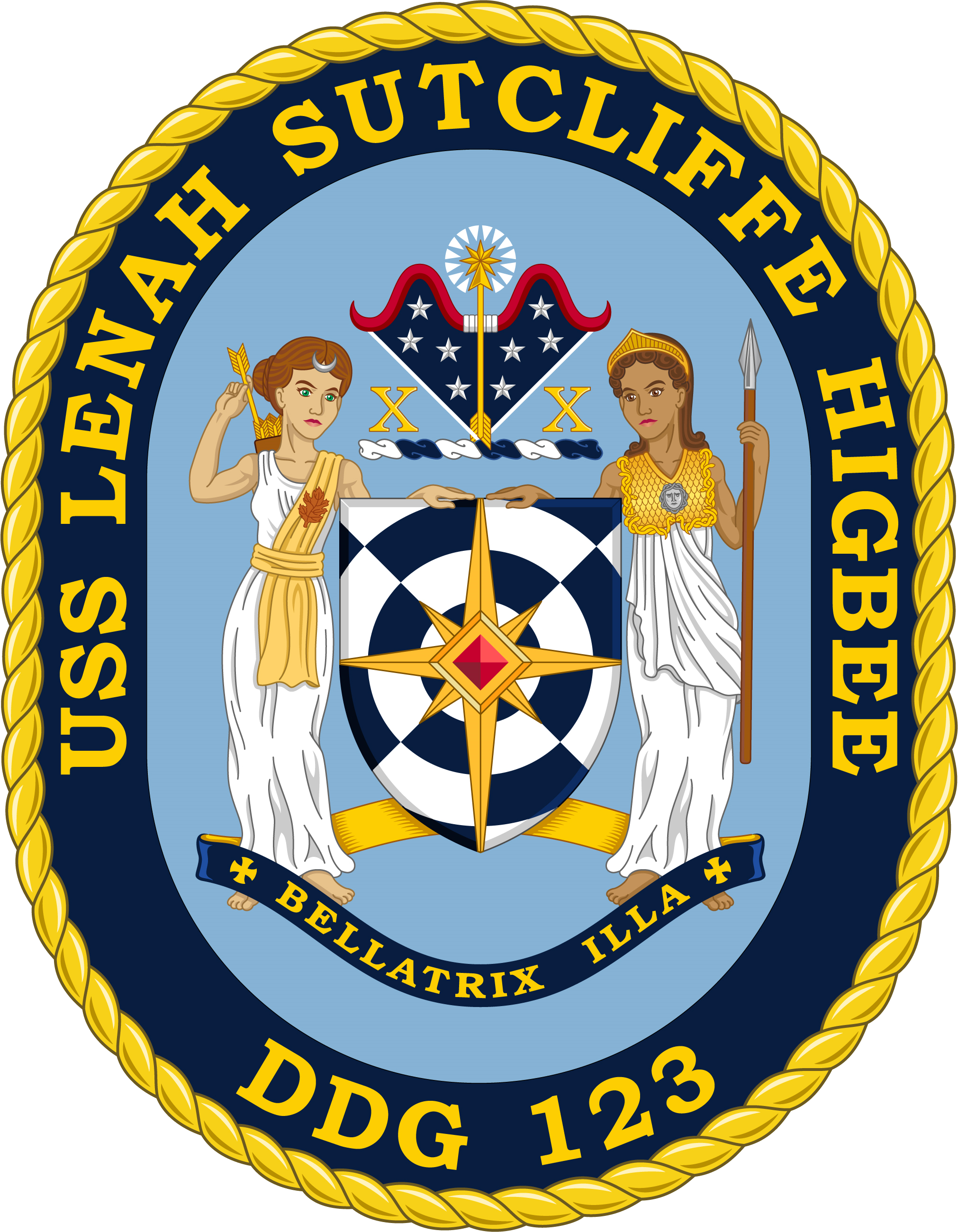
- Badge

General characteristics
- Class & type: Arleigh Burke-class destroyer
- Displacement: 9,217 tons (full load)
- Length: 513 ft (156 m)
- Beam: 66 ft (20 m)
- Propulsion: 4 × General Electric LM2500 gas turbines 100,000 shp (75,000 kW)
- Speed: 31 knots (57 km/h; 36 mph)
- Complement: 380 officers and enlisted
- Armament: Guns: 1 × 5-inch (127 mm)/62 Mk 45 Mod 4 (lightweight gun); 1 × 20 mm (0.8 in) Phalanx CIWS; 2 × 25 mm (0.98 in) Mk 38 machine gun system; 4 × 0.50 in (12.7 mm) caliber guns; Missiles: 1 × 32-cell, 1 × 64-cell (96 total cells) Mk 41 vertical launching system (VLS): RIM-66M surface-to-air missile; RIM-156 surface-to-air missile; RIM-174A Standard ERAM; RIM-161 anti-ballistic missile; RIM-162 ESSM (quad-packed); BGM-109 Tomahawk cruise missile; RUM-139 vertical launch ASROC; Torpedoes: 2 × Mark 32 triple torpedo tubes: Mark 46 lightweight torpedo; Mark 50 lightweight torpedo; Mark 54 lightweight torpedo
- Aircraft carried: 2 × MH-60R Seahawk helicopters
- Aviation facilities: Double hangar and helipad

USS Lenah Sutcliffe Higbee (DDG-123) is an Arleigh Burke-class (Flight IIA) Aegis guided missile destroyer. She is named for Chief Nurse Lenah H. Sutcliffe Higbee (1874–1941). Sutcliffe Higbee was a pioneering Navy nurse who served as Superintendent of the U.S. Navy Nurse Corps during World War I and the first woman to be awarded the Navy Cross.

== Construction ==
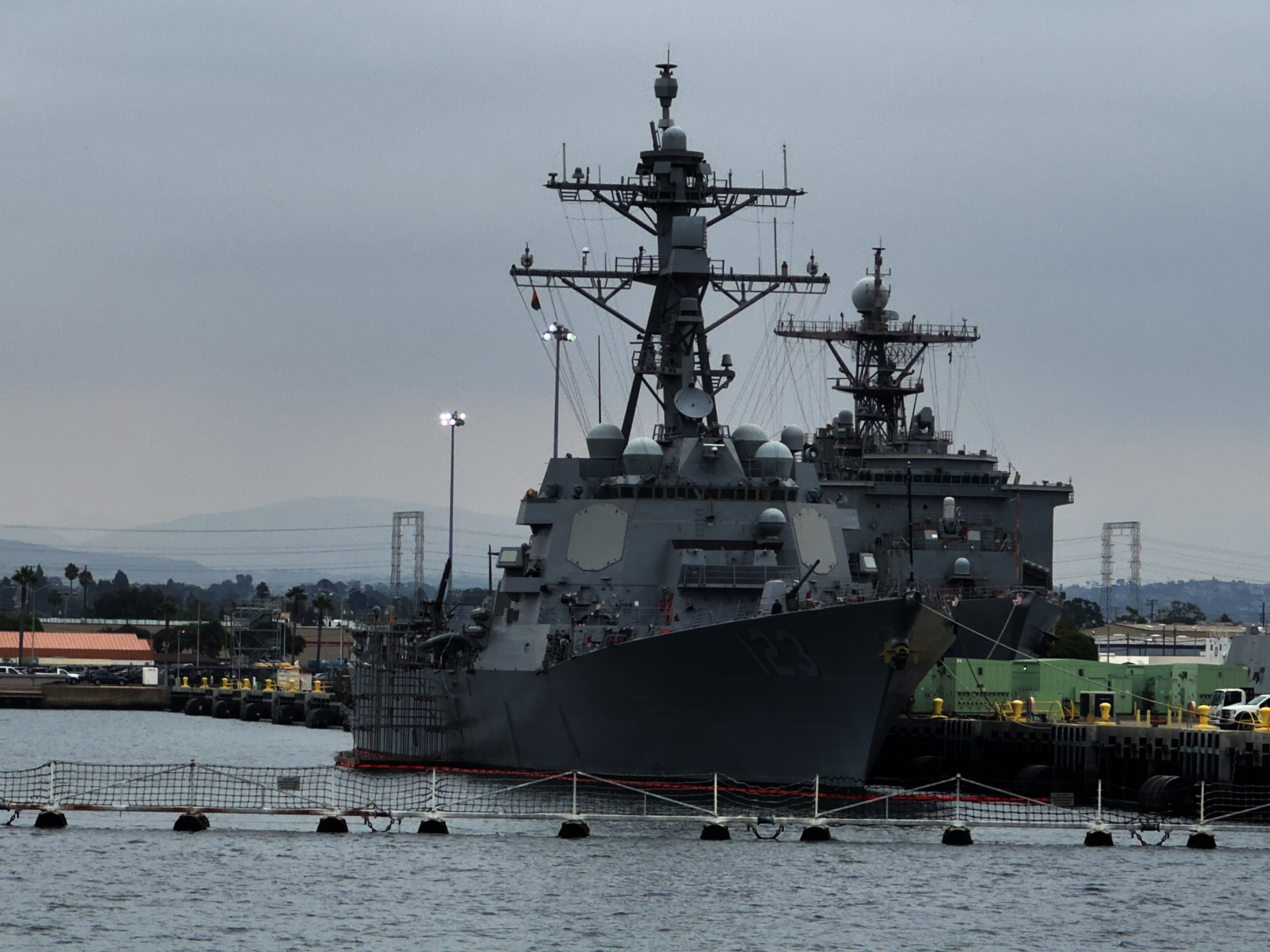
USS Lenah Sutcliffe Higbee (DDG-123) at Naval Base San Diego, October 2024

Ingalls Shipbuilding was awarded the contract for Lenah Sutcliffe Higbee in June 2013, and began fabrication of the vessel in January 2017. The ship's keel was laid in a ceremony at the Ingalls shipyards on 14 November 2017, and sponsored by Louisa Dixon, Virginia Munford, and Rolanda Pickett Wilson. She was launched on 27 January 2020, and christened on 24 April 2021 in Pascagoula, Mississippi. On 30 November 2022, Lenah Sutcliffe Higbee was delivered to the Navy, and commissioned in Key West, Florida, on 13 May 2023.

== Service history ==
Lenah Sutcliffe Higbee unveiled a new battle flag in 2025, the flag pays tribute to the first female naval nurses. The flag shows the number 20 surrounded by 20 gold stars.

The ship commenced its maiden deployment in March of 2025 and returned in December of 2025 after operating in 5th and 7th fleet as part of the Nimitz Carrier Strike Group.

== Bibliography ==
- "Huntington Ingalls Industries Authenticates Keel of Guided Missile Destroyer Lenah H. Sutcliffe Higbee (DDG 123)" (Press release). Huntington Ingalls Industries. 14 November 2017.
- "Keel Laid for Future USS Lenah H Sutcliffe Higbee" (Press release). United States Navy. 15 November 2017. NNS171115-01. Archived from the original on 15 November 2017.
- "Huntington Ingalls Industries Christens Destroyer Lenah Sutcliffe Higbee (DDG 123)" (Press release). Huntington Ingalls Industries. 25 April 2021.
- "Navy Accepts Delivery of Future USS Lenah Sutcliffe Higbee" (Press release). United States Navy. 1 December 2022.
- "USS Lenah Sutcliffe Higbee Commissions in Conch Republic Honoring Navy Nurses" (Press release). COMNAVSURFPAC. 13 May 2023.
- "USS Lenah Sutcliffe Higbee (DDG 123)". The Institute of Heraldry. U.S. Army. 6 July 2021. Archived from the original on 9 July 2021.
- "DDG-51 Arleigh Burke-class". Federation of American Scientists. FAS.org. 2 November 2016. Archived from the original on 27 September 2023.
- Kreisher, Otto (14 June 2016). "Mabus Names Arleigh Burke Destroyer After Higbee, First Woman Awarded Navy Cross". United States Naval Institute.
- "Ingalls starts fabrication of DDG 123". Marine Log. 27 January 2017.
- "HII Delivers Destroyer Lenah Sutcliffe Higbee (DDG 123) to U S. Navy" (Press release). Huntington Ingalls Industries. 1 December 2022.
- "Navy commissions Arleigh Burke-class guided-missile destroyer Lenah Sutcliff Higbee". WJXT. 13 May 2023.
- Guldin, Joanna (28 March 2025). "This Navy Destroyer's New Battle Flag Pays Tribute to the Service's First Female Nurses". military.com.
