= Josephine Beatrice Bowman =

US Navy nurse (1881–1971)

J. Beatrice Bowman
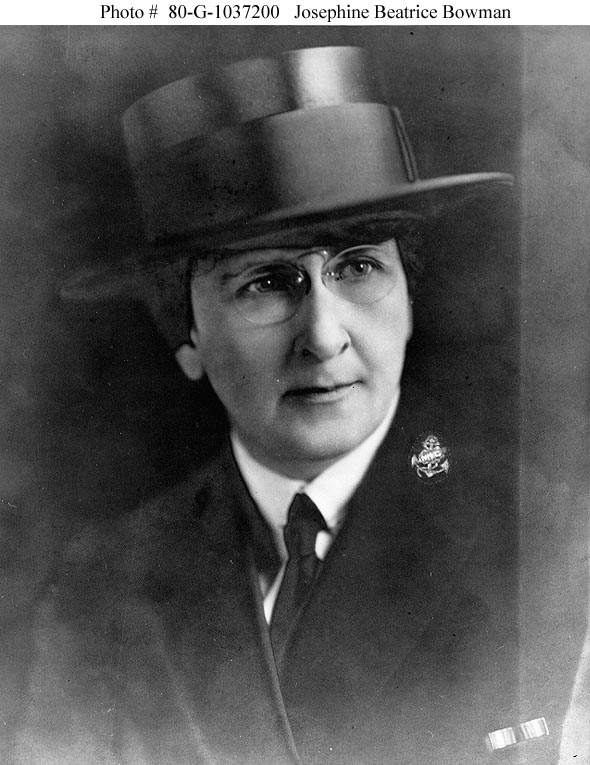
- LCDR, USN(NC)
- Born: December 19, 1881; Des Moines, Iowa, US
- Died: January 3, 1971 (aged 89) Pennsylvania, US
- Buried: Arlington National Cemetery
- Allegiance: United States
- Branch: United States Navy
- Service years: 1908– 1935
- Rank: LCDR
- Commands: Superintendent of the United States Navy Nurse Corps
- Conflicts: World War I

Josephine Beatrice Bowman was the third superintendent of the United States Navy Nurse Corps.

== Early life ==
Josephine Beatrice Bowman was born in Des Moines, Iowa, on 19 December 1881. She graduated from nurses' training at the Medico-Chirurgical Hospital, Philadelphia, Pennsylvania, in 1904 and soon enrolled with the American Red Cross Nursing Service. In the spring of 1908, Bowman took part in the first Red Cross disaster relief operation after a tornado caused extensive damage around Hattiesburg, Mississippi.

== Navy Nurse Corps career ==
On 3 October 1908, Bowman joined the newly established U.S. Navy Nurse Corps as one of its first twenty members (the "Sacred Twenty"). She was promoted to Chief Nurse in 1911.

Chief Nurse Bowman temporarily left the Navy in October 1914 and spent the next several months as a Red Cross nurse caring for war casualties in Great Britain. As the supervising nurse of Unit D, she served at Royal Naval Hospital Haslar, England, for six months. She returned to the Navy in May 1915. In early 1916 she arrived in Guam to conduct a two-year course with three other nurses in modern midwifery and practical nursing at the Navy Nurse's training school in Guam for the local Chamorro women. She also chaired the Department of Physiology and Hygiene at the normal school. After the U.S. entered World War I, she became chief nurse at the Naval Hospital, Great Lakes, Illinois, and guided its nursing staff during that facility's great expansion to meet the needs of war and the 1918-19 influenza epidemic. She also served as chief nurse at Fort Lyon, Colorado, a Navy tuberculosis sanitarium for sailors and marines.

In 1919, Chief Nurse Bowman led the first contingent of Navy nurses assigned to the hospital ship USS Relief (AH-1), the first Navy women to serve at sea. She became superintendent of the Navy Nurse Corps in December 1922 and held that position for over twelve years, until her retirement at the beginning of 1935.

== Contributions as superintendent ==
As superintendent, Bowman worked hard to recruit nurses for the Navy Nurse Corps and to improve the pay benefits and uniforms for the nurses. She advocated for military status and encouraged postgraduate education. Inspections were increased for the purpose of establishing uniform standards across all naval hospitals.

== Later life ==
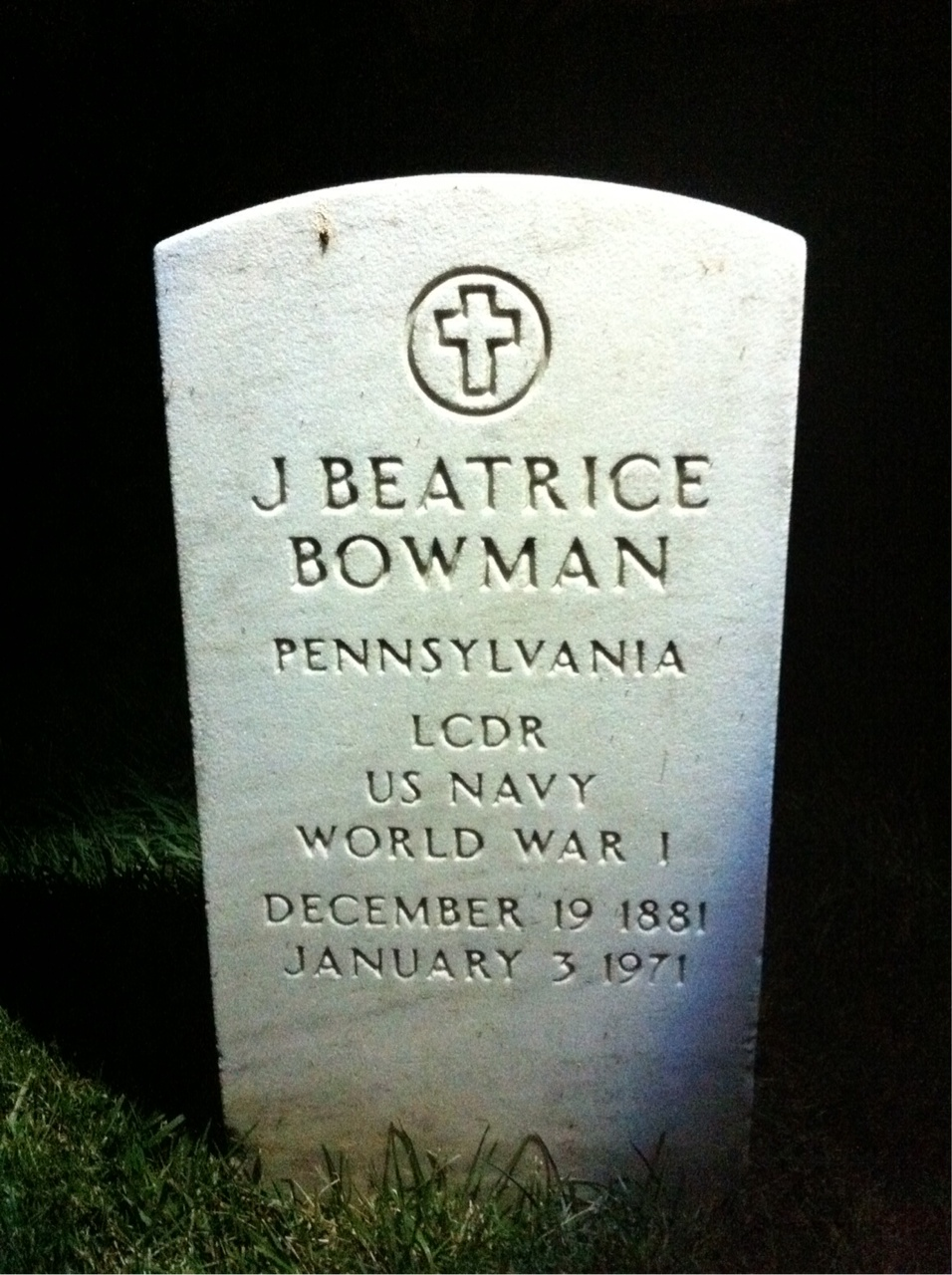
Grave at Arlington National Cemetery

Following her departure from active duty, she made her home in Pennsylvania and stayed active in national and local nursing affairs. When Navy nurses were included in the Navy's ranking system, she received the retirement rank of lieutenant commander in recognition of her service as Nurse Corps' superintendent. Bowman died on 3 January 1971 in Pennsylvania and is buried at Arlington National Cemetery.

Preceded by Lenah Sutcliffe Higbee	Superintendent, Navy Nurse Corps; 1922-1935	Succeeded by Myn M. Hoffman
