= Elizabeth Leonhardt =

- Born: December 7, 1867; Virginia
- Died: February 19, 1953; Herndon, Virginia
- Burial place: Chestnut Grove Cemetery; Herndon, Virginia
- Military career
- Allegiance: American
- Branch: United States Navy Nurse Corps
- Service years: 1919-1926
- Rank: Chief Nurse

Elizabeth Leonhardt (December 7, 1867 – February 19, 1953) was one of the Sacred Twenty, the first 20 nurses in the United States Navy Nurse Corps during World War I. She was the Chief Nurse of the US Navy Nurse Corps in 1919.

== Early life ==
Elizabeth Leonhardt was born on December 7, 1867, in Virginia and grew up in Herndon. She was the sixth of nine children born to Jacob and Mary Leonhardt. Although on her birth certificate it reads, "Elizabeth," the name on her gravestone is, "Elisabeth."

== Sacred Twenty ==
On April 26, 1911, Leonhardt arrived at the Susana Hospital in Agana. She was in charge of two nurses, Julia T. Coonan and Anna Turner. All three nurses worked primarily with women and children. Their intention was to train Chamorro women in nursing so that they would replace inefficient midwives, who were the only nurses available in Guam at the time. They established a successful training school, where Leonhardt was able to teach the women some English. Though most of the communication was through sign language. In 1914, the surgeon general raised the number of nurses in Guam in order to increase class size and "to expand training to include tubercular cases and massage therapy." Leonhardt would remain Chief Nurse in Guam until 1914.

In 1919, Leonhardt held the title of Chief Nurse, USN. She was assigned to the Naval Hospital in Norfolk, Virginia. Starting May 21, 1920, Leonhardt was on temporary duty on board the USS Mercy for its voyage from New York City to San Francisco. She returned to her regular duties as Chief Nurse on July 18 that same year. In September 1922, she was ordered to report to the Naval Hospital in Puget Sound, Washington. Here, Leonhardt assumed the position of Principal Chief Nurse and held this position through 1926.

Leonhardt received a letter of commendation from the Navy in 1920.
