= Lenah Higbee =

United States Navy nurse (1874–1941)

Lenah Sutcliffe Higbee
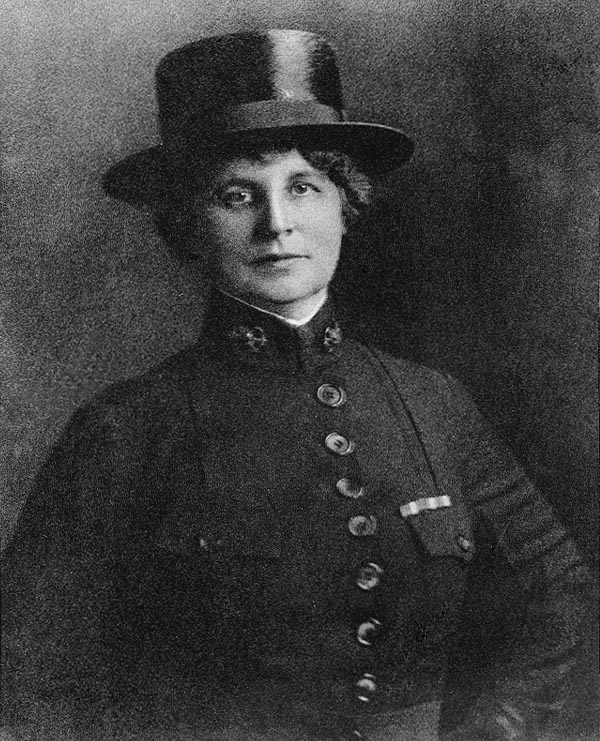
- Born: May 18, 1874; Chatham, Dominion of Canada
- Died: January 10, 1941 (aged 66); Winter Park, Florida, U.S.
- Burial place: Arlington National Cemetery (Section 3, Site 1797-WS)
- Spouse(s): LtCol John Henley Higbee, USMC
- Military career
- Allegiance: United States
- Branch: United States Navy
- Service years: 1908–1922
- Rank: Chief nurse
- Commands: Superintendent of the U.S. Navy Nurse Corps (1911–22)
- Conflicts: World War I
- Awards: Navy Cross

Lenah H. Sutcliffe Higbee (May 18, 1874 – January 10, 1941) was a pioneering Canadian-born United States Navy military nurse, who served as Superintendent of the U.S. Navy Nurse Corps during World War I. She was the first woman to be awarded the Navy Cross.

== Early life and education ==
Higbee was born Lenah H. Sutcliffe in Chatham, New Brunswick, Canada, on 18 May 1874. She completed nurses' training at the New York Post-Graduate Hospital in 1899 and entered private practice soon thereafter. Lenah Higbee took postgraduate training at Fordham Hospital, New York in 1908.

In 1899, she married retired Marine Corps Lieutenant Colonel John H. Higbee. His first wife Isabel Higbee had died in 1898. John Higbee had served as a Marine Corps officer from 1861 to 1898. He died in April 1908 and was interred at Arlington National Cemetery.

== Career ==
In October 1908, she joined the newly established U.S. Navy Nurse Corps as one of its first twenty members. These nurses, who came to be called "The Sacred Twenty", were the first women to formally serve as members of the Navy. The Navy required its first Nurse Corps candidates to be between 22 and 44 years old and also unmarried. As a 34-year-old widow, Higbee met these requirements.

She was promoted to Chief Nurse in 1909. Lenah Higbee became Chief Nurse at Norfolk Naval Hospital in April 1909.

In January 1911, Higbee became the second Superintendent of the U.S. Navy Nurse Corps. For her achievements in leading the Corps through the First World War, Chief Nurse Higbee was the first woman awarded the Navy Cross. Navy nurses Marie Louise Hidell, Lillian M. Murphy and Edna E. Place were also awarded the Navy Cross in 1920 for their World War I service, but these women all received the award posthumously after having succumbed to the Spanish flu, which they contracted while caring for hospital patients.

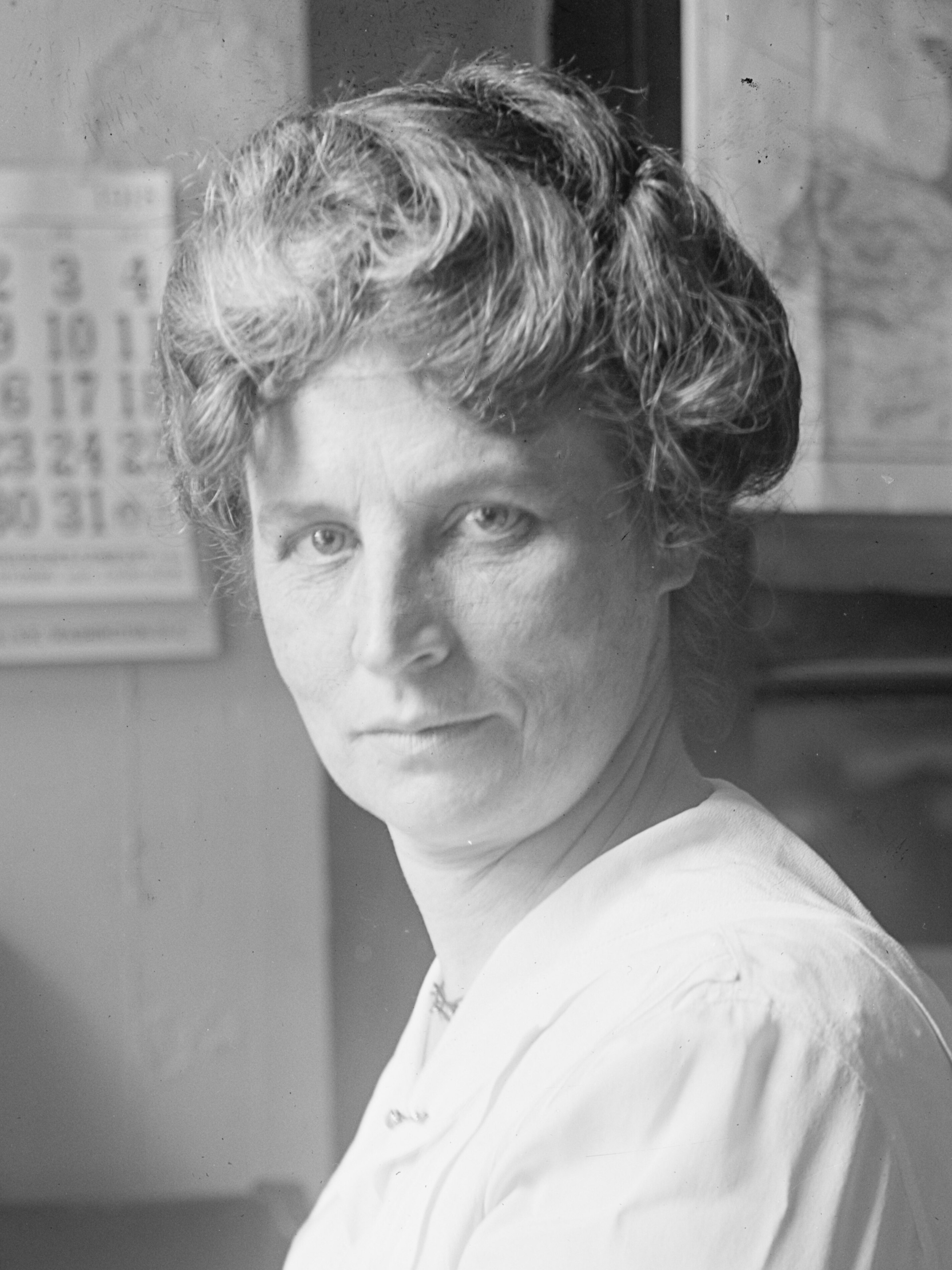
Lenah Higbee in 1918

=== Navy Cross citation ===

Date of Action: 1918 The President of the United States of America takes pleasure in presenting the Navy Cross to Superintendent Lenah Sutcliff Higbee, United States Navy, for distinguished service in the line of her profession and unusual and conspicuous devotion to duty as Superintendent of the Navy Nurse Corps.

== Later life and death ==
She resigned from the position of Superintendent and retired from the Navy on 23 November 1922.

Higbee died at Winter Park, Florida, on 10 January 1941 and is buried at Arlington National Cemetery, in Arlington, Virginia.

== Legacy ==
The US Navy has named two ships in her honor;

- USS Higbee (DD-806), a Gearing-class destroyer commissioned in 1945, as the first U.S. Navy warship to bear the name of one of its female members.
- USS Lenah H. Sutcliffe Higbee (DDG-123), an Arleigh Burke-class guided missile destroyer, commissioned 13 May 2023.

Military offices
Preceded by Esther Hasson	Superintendent of the Navy Nurse Corps; 1911–1922	Succeeded by Josephine Beatrice Bowman
