= Kien An Airport =

Airport in Vietnam

Kien An Airport Sân bay Kiến An
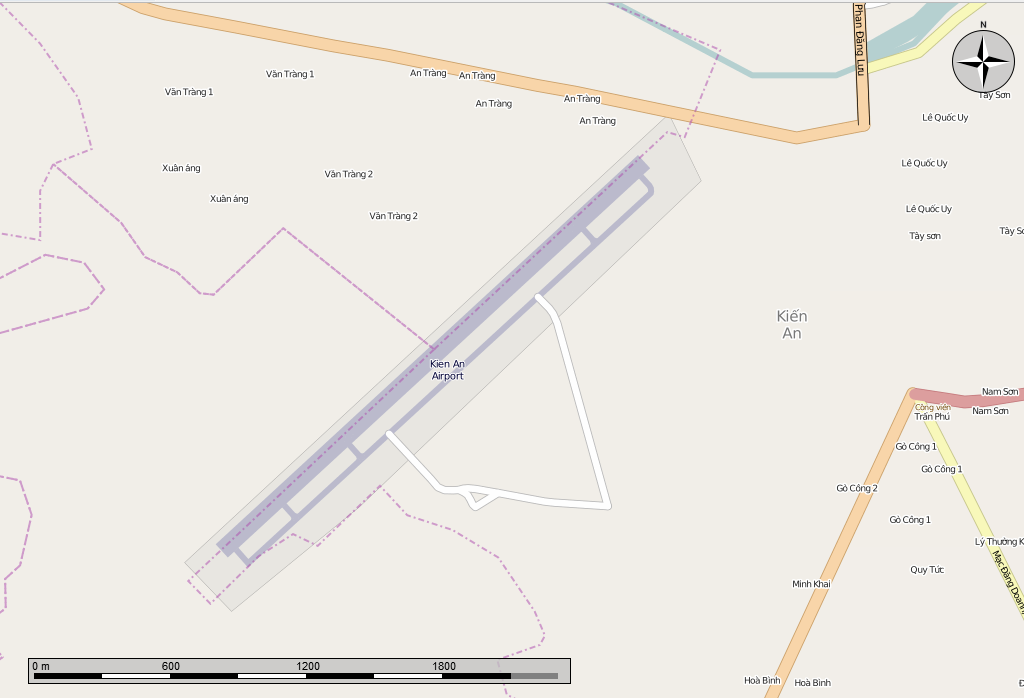
- IATA: none; ICAO: VV03

Summary
- Airport type: Military
- Operator: Vietnam People's Air Force
- Location: Haiphong
- Elevation AMSL: 15 m (49 ft)
- Coordinates: 20°48′12″N 106°36′17″E

Map
- Location within Vietnam Location within South China Sea Location within Southeast Asia Location within Asia Location within Earth

Runways
Direction	Length		Surface
Direction	ft	m	Surface
05/23	7,874	2,400	Concrete

Kien An Airport is a military airport, a standby airport for Cat Bi Airport in Haiphong, northern Vietnam. The single runway is 2,400 m, concrete surface. Its ICAO code is VV03.

Kien An Airport is located in Phù Liễn Ward, Hải Phòng, 10 km from Cat Bi Airport to the west.

== History ==
=== First Indochina War ===
The airfield was constructed during the French colonial period. The airfield was reportedly constructed over a 2-year period with large amounts of crushed rock being used to build foundations on the marshy land. The first French aircraft to land at Kien An apparently buckled the runway and the project was abandoned by the French.

=== Vietnam War ===
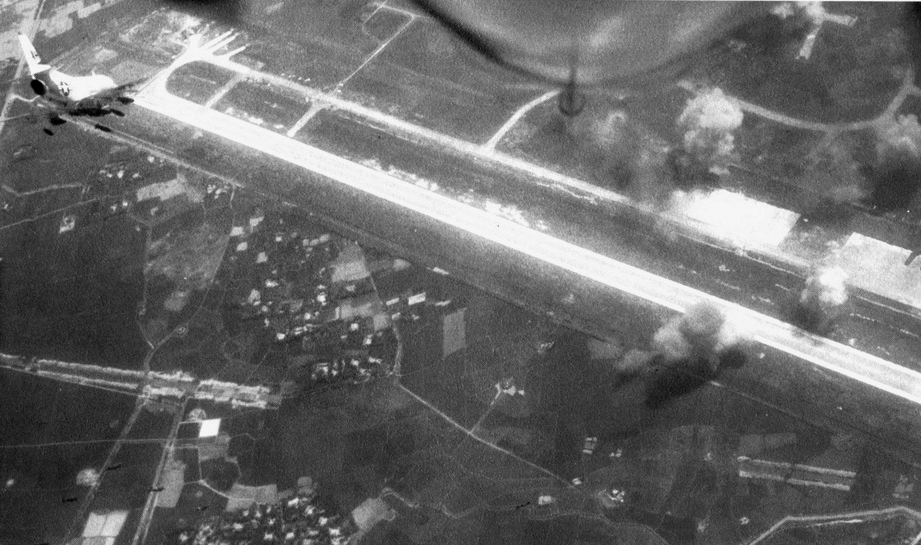
Kien An air base under attack by US Navy A-4 Skyhawks in October 1967

The base was put into service by the Vietnam People's Air Force (VPAF). In July 1966 the National Photographic Interpretation Center reported that Kien An Airfield comprised "a 5900 ft x 150 ft, NE/SW, serviceable runway, resurfaced since October 1965. The airfield has a parallel taxiway with two end-connecting links, and a parking apron. An aircraft dispersal area contains seventeen revetted hardstands and eighteen hardstands recessed into the base of a hill at the southeast section of the airfield. Support facilities include one large probable maintenance building (where Hook helicopters are being assembled) and numerous support buildings. A probable ILS is located off the southwest end of the runway. Defenses in the immediate area include at least three eight-gun AAA sites. Aircraft at the airfield include four Hook helicopters without rotors in the process of being assembled, one probable Fresco (this is the first time a jet-type aircraft has been observed at this airfield), three Colt and one Hound."

On 14 April 1966 the VPAF deployed MiG-15/17s and at least 4 MiG-21s to Kien An and on 17 April these aircraft engaged United States' aircraft.

Due to its proximity to Haiphong, the base was in the restricted area that US forces were prohibited from attacking, allowing the VPAF aircraft there to operate without the threat of air attack. The restricted area around Haiphong was reduced in March 1967 and the first US air attack on the base took place on 23 April 1967.

On 19 November 1967 4 MiG-17s deployed from Kép Air Base to Kien An intercepted a United States Navy strike package near the base, shooting down 2 F-4B Phantom IIs of VF-151.

On 26 August 1972 during Operation Linebacker U.S. Navy jets bombed the base. During Operation Linebacker II in December 1972 the base was repeatedly struck by U.S. Navy aircraft causing extensive damage. On 21 December 1972 the AAA defenses at the base shot down A-6 Intruder BuNo 152946 of VA-75 as it made a night attack on the base, both crewmen were killed.
