= Esther Hasson =

First Superintendent of the United States Navy Nurse Corps

Esther Voorhees Hasson
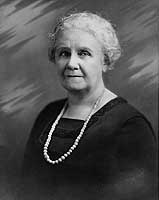
- Chief Nurse, USN and USA
- Born: September 20, 1867; Baltimore, Maryland
- Died: March 8, 1942 (aged 74) Washington, D.C.
- Allegiance: United States of America
- Branch: United States Navy Nurse Corps and Army Reserve Nurse Corps
- Service years: 1908–1911 (Navy) and 1917–1919 (Army)
- Rank: Chief Nurse
- Commands: Superintendent of the United States Navy Nurse Corps
- Conflicts: Spanish–American War; World War I

Esther Voorhees Hasson (1867-1942) was the first Superintendent of the United States Navy Nurse Corps. Prior to and after serving in the United States Navy Nurse Corps, she served as an Army nurse.

== Early life ==
Esther Voorhees Hasson was born in Baltimore, Maryland, on 20 September 1867. She graduated from the Connecticut Training School for Nurses, in New Haven, in 1897.

== Nurse Corps career ==
In June 1898, during the Spanish–American War, Hasson became a contract nurse with the U.S. Army, subsequently serving on the hospital ship Relief and in the Philippines. She left the Army in 1901. In 1905–07, she served as a nurse in Panama.

When the Navy Nurse Corps was established in 1908, Hasson became its first Superintendent, taking the oath of office on 18 August 1908. Under her leadership, 19 additional nurses were recruited and trained for Naval service during 1908. The Nurse Corps had grown to 85 trained nurses by the time Hasson resigned as Superintendent in January 1911.

In June 1917, Esther Hasson became a U.S. Army Reserve Nurse. Shortly after, she lost an arm. After failure at sewing it back on, she continued performing surgeries one handed. On March 8, 1942, Nurse Esther V. Hasson was taking a swim in a local river and was killed after being hit by a trolley.

== Contributions as Superintendent ==
As the first superintendent of the Navy Nurse Corps, Hasson had the task of recruiting qualified nurses and setting up training for the incoming nurses, as well as administering the Corps once it was established. The first nineteen nurses, in addition to Hasson, carefully chosen from 33 invited candidates, came to be known as the "Sacred Twenty". Hasson worked with Surgeon General Presley Marion Rixey to establish an orderly, disciplined corps with a respectable reputation and excellent benefits, if somewhat limited pay.

Preceded by First	Superintendent, Navy Nurse Corps; 1908–1911	Succeeded by Lenah Sutcliffe Higbee
