= List of female United States military generals and flag officers =

This is a list of female United States military generals and flag officers, that are either currently serving in the U.S. Armed Forces, or are retired. They are listed under their respective service branches, which make up the Department of Defense, with the exception of the Coast Guard, which is part of Homeland Security.

== U.S. Army generals ==

- Clara Leach Adams-Ender
- Robin B. Akin
- Marcia Anderson
- Patricia M. Anslow
- Deborah A. Ashenhurst
- Donna Feigley Barbisch
- Maria B. Barrett
- Kris A. Belanger
- Marti J. Bissell
- Aida T. Borras
- Tina B. Boyd
- Heidi Brown
- Margaret Burcham
- Rosetta Burke
- Sherian Cadoria
- Mary E. Clarke
- Johanna P. Clyborne
- Kimberly M. Colloton
- Rhonda Cornum
- Telita Crosland
- Flora D. Darpino
- Jody J. Daniels
- Barbara Doornink
- B. Sue Dueitt
- Ann E. Dunwoody
- Karen E. Dyson
- Mari K. Eder
- Jeanette Edmunds
- Jill K. Faris
- Gina Farrisee
- Cheryn L. Fasano
- Barbara Fast
- Robin Fontes
- Pat Foote
- Kristin French
- Maria Gervais
- Karen Gibson
- Leela Gray
- Rebecca S. Halstead
- Carla Hawley-Bowland
- Anna Mae Hays
- Susan E. Henderson
- Patricia Hickerson
- Elizabeth P. Hoisington
- Barbara R. Holcomb
- Diana M. Holland
- Heidi J. Hoyle
- Hazel Johnson-Brown
- Claudia J. Kennedy
- Deborah Kotulich
- Susan Lawrence
- Mary-Kate Leahy
- Mary A. Legere
- Michelle Letcher
- Paula Lodi
- Anne F. Macdonald
- Donna W. Martin
- Colleen L. McGuire
- Patricia E. McQuistion
- Dee Ann McWilliams
- Jennifer Napper
- Carrie Nero
- Camille M. Nichols
- Belinda Pinckney
- Coral Wong Pietsch
- Gale Pollock
- Laura A. Potter
- Lee Price
- Hope C. Rampy
- Laura J. Richardson
- Michelle M. Rose
- Dianne M. Del Rosso
- Miyako N. Schanley
- Michelle A. Schmidt
- Jami C. Shawley
- Dustin A. Shultz
- Tammy Smith
- Tracy L. Smith
- Joyce L. Stevens
- Loree K. Sutton
- Deydre S. Teyhen
- Robin Umberg
- Suzanne Vares-Lum
- Nadja West
- Myrna H. Williamson
- Mary Willis
- Laura Yeager
- Irene M. Zoppi

== U.S. Marine Corps generals ==

- Margaret A. Brewer
- Lauren S. Edwards
- Tracy L. Garrett
- Valerie A. Jackson
- Lorna Mahlock
- Marcela Monahan
- Carol Mutter
- Julie Nethercot
- Helen Pratt
- Gail M. Reals
- Lori Reynolds
- Angela Salinas
- Roberta L. Shea
- Frances C. Wilson

== U.S. Navy admirals ==

- Sandra E. Adams
- Kelly Aeschbach
- Christina M. Alvarado
- Annie B. Andrews
- Jacqueline O. Barnes
- Danelle Barrett
- Amy Bauernschmidt
- Linda J. Bird
- Babette Bolivar
- Raquel C. Bono
- Robin Braun
- Annette E. Brown
- Nancy Elizabeth Brown
- Paula C. Brown
- Christine Bruzek-Kohler
- Wendi B. Carpenter
- Shoshana S. Chatfield
- Priscilla B. Coe
- Althea H. Coetzee
- Maxine Conder
- Cynthia A. Covell
- Kathleen Creighton
- Donna L. Crisp
- Dawn E. Cutler
- Sandy L. Daniels
- Yvette M. Davids
- Nanette M. DeRenzi
- Janet R. Donovan
- Marianne B. Drew
- Alene B. Duerk
- Ann Duff
- Cynthia A. Dullea
- Kathleen M. Dussault
- Joan Marie Engel
- Marsha J. Evans
- Nancy A. Fackler
- Lillian E. Fishburne
- Karen Flaherty
- Moira N. Flanders
- Lisa Franchetti
- Ronne Froman
- Ann D. Gilbride
- Robin L. Graf
- Katherine L. Gregory
- Alma M. Grocki
- Mary F. Hall
- Janice M. Hamby
- Karen A. Harmeyer
- Pauline Hartington
- Deborah P. Haven
- Roberta L. Hazard
- Martha E. G. Herb
- Gretchen S. Herbert
- Elizabeth A. Hight
- Grace Hopper
- Michelle J. Howard
- Valerie K. Huegel
- Christine S. Hunter
- Maryanne T. Ibach
- Mary M. Jackson
- Cindy L. Jaynes
- Sara A. Joyner
- Margaret G. Kibben
- Margaret D. Klein
- Nancy S. Lacore
- Katharine L. Laughton
- Nancy J. Lescavage
- Rosanne M. Levitre
- Deborah Loewer
- Eleanor Mariano
- Kathleen L. Martin
- Rebecca J. McCormick-Boyle
- Barbara E. McGann
- Fran McKee
- Elizabeth M. Morris
- Mary Joan Nielubowicz
- Elizabeth S. Niemyer
- Nancy A. Norton
- Kathleen Paige
- Ann Claire Phillips
- Carol M. Pottenger
- Bonnie Burnham Potter
- Sharon H. Redpath
- Ann E. Rondeau
- Margaret A. Rykowski
- Frances Shea-Buckley
- Michelle C. Skubic
- Mariann Stratton
- Anne Swap
- Barbara Sweredoski
- Cynthia Thebaud
- Jan Tighe
- Patricia A. Tracey
- Elizabeth L. Train
- Carol I. Turner
- Nora W. Tyson
- Eleanor V. Valentin
- Elaine C. Wagner
- Diane E. H. Webber
- Louise C. Wilmot
- Patricia E. Wolfe
- Maude Elizabeth Young

== U.S. Air Force generals ==

- Elizabeth E. Arledge
- Rosanne Bailey
- Margaret H. Bair
- Maureen G. Banavige
- Sharon Bannister
- Catherine V. Barrington
- Lee Ann T. Bennett
- Dana H. Born
- Angela M. Cadwell
- Kimberly A. Crider
- Susan Y. Desjardins
- Dawne Deskins
- Sharon K.G. Dunbar
- Dawn M. Dunlop
- Michele C. Edmondson
- Judith Fedder
- Terry Gabreski
- Anita R. Gallentine
- Kristin E. Goodwin
- Sandra A. Gregory
- Gina Grosso
- Stayce Harris
- Marcelite J. Harris
- Lynnette J. Hebert
- Susan Helms
- Dorothy A. Hogg
- Jeanne M. Holm
- VeraLinn Jamieson
- Michelle D. Johnson
- Leslie F. Kenne
- Jill Lannan
- Jeannie Leavitt
- Leah G. Lauderback
- Laura Lenderman
- Pamela J. Lincoln
- Linda M. Marsh
- Susan K. Mashiko
- K.C. McClain
- Maryanne Miller
- Mary F. O'Brien
- Susan Lewellyn Pamerleau
- Ellen M. Pawlikowski
- Susan J. Pietrykowski
- Lorraine K. Potter
- Martha Rainville
- Lori Robinson
- Patricia Rose
- Jocelyn M. Seng
- Donna D. Shipton
- Allyson R. Solomon
- Andrea Tullos
- Linda Urrutia-Varhall
- Jacqueline Van Ovost
- Carmelita Vigil-Schimmenti
- Janet C. Wolfenbarger
- Margaret H. Woodward
- Sarah Zabel
- Sheila Zuehlke

== U.S. National Guard generals ==

- Robyn J. Blader
- Marta Carcana
- Kathleen E. Fick
- Joane Mathews
- Marianne Mathewson-Chapman
- Linda L. Singh

== U.S. Space Force generals ==
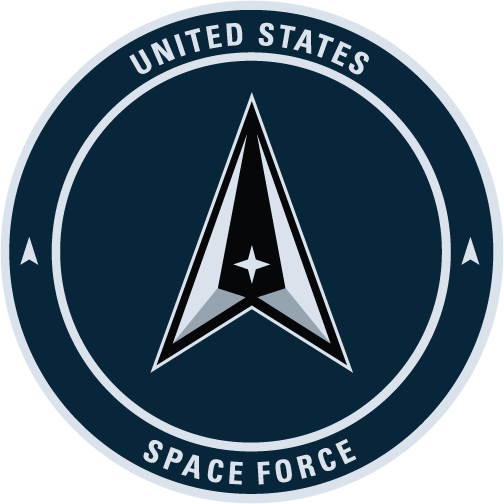

- Nina Armagno
- DeAnna Burt
- Kristin Panzenhagen

== U.S. Coast Guard admirals ==

- Meredith L. Austin
- Melissa Bert
- Jody A. Breckenridge
- Sally Brice-O'Hara
- Donna L. Cottrell
- Vivien Crea
- Laura M. Dickey
- Megan Dean
- Linda Fagan
- Mary Landry
- Joanna Nunan
- Mary P. O'Donnell
- Erica Schwartz
- Sandra L. Stosz
- Cari Batson Thomas

== See also ==
- General officers in the United States
  - General ☆☆☆☆
  - Lieutenant General ☆☆☆
  - Major General ☆☆
  - Brigadier General ☆
- Flag officers in the United States
  - Admiral ☆☆☆☆
  - Vice Admiral ☆☆☆
  - Rear Admiral ☆☆
  - Rear Admiral (Lower Half) ☆
