= Nielubowicz =

Nielubowicz is a surname. Notable people with the surname include:

- Mary Joan Nielubowicz (1929–2008), American nurse
- Piotr Nielubowicz, Polish manager
