= Rykowski =

Rykowski (Polish feminine: Rykowska; plural: Rykowscy) is a surname. It is related to the Czech surname Rykovský/Rykovská.

Notable people with this surname include:

- Kazimiera Rykowska (1933–2012), Polish athlete
- Margaret A. Rykowski (born 1965), United States Navy rear admiral
