= General Rose =

General Rose may refer to:

- Hugh Rose, 1st Baron Strathnairn (1801–1885), British Army general
- Maurice Rose (1899–1945), U.S. Army major general
- Michael Rose (British Army officer) (born 1940), British Army general
- Patricia Rose (fl. 1980s–2010s), U.S. Air Force major general
- William I. Rose (United States Army officer) (1898–1954), Massachusetts National Guard major general
