= General Marsh =

General Marsh may refer to:

- C. Carroll Marsh (born 1829), Union Army brigadier general of U.S. Volunteers
- James Marsh (British Army officer) (died 1804), British Army general
- Linda M. Marsh (fl. 1980s–2020s), U.S. Air Force major general
- Mary A. Marsh (born 1930), U.S. Air Force brigadier general
- Robert T. Marsh (1925–2017), U.S. Air Force four-star general
