= General Stevens =

General Stevens may refer to:

- Clement H. Stevens (1821–1864), Confederate States Army brigadier general
- Ebenezer Stevens (1751–1823), New York State Militia major general in the American Revolutionary War
- Hestor L. Stevens (1803–1864), New York State Militia major general
- Isaac Stevens (1818–1862), Union Army brigadier general posthumously promoted to major general
- Jack Stevens (1896–1969), Australian Army major general
- John Harvey Stevens (died 1866), Royal Marines major general
- Joyce L. Stevens (fl. 1970s–2010s), U.S. Army major general
- Walter H. Stevens (1827–1867), Confederate States Army brigadier general
- William George Stevens (1893–1975), New Zealand Military Forces major general
