= Patricia Rose =

US Air Force general

Patricia A Rose
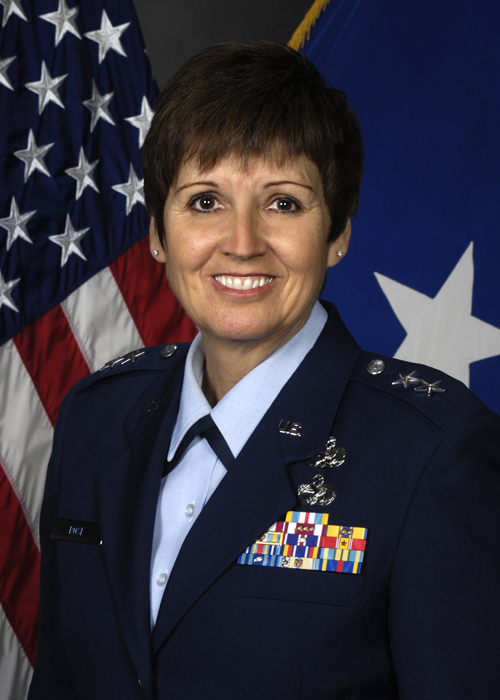
- Military career
- Allegiance: United States
- Branch: United States Air Force
- Service years: 1984-2017
- Rank: Major general
- Nickname: Trish
- Awards: Defense Superior Service Medal; Legion of Merit; Defense Meritorious Service Medal; Meritorious Service Medal with three oak leaf clusters; Air Force Commendation Medal with two oak leaf clusters; Joint Meritorious Unit Award with oak leaf cluster; Air Force Outstanding Unit Award with five oak leaf clusters; National Defense Service Medal with bronze star; Global War on Terrorism Expeditionary Medal; Global War on Terrorism Service Medal; Military Outstanding Volunteer Service Medal; Air Force Longevity Service Award with seven oak leaf clusters; Armed Forces Reserve Medal with silver hourglass and bronze M; Air Force Training Ribbon

Patricia Rose is a retired United States Air Force major general.

USAF Major General Patricia A. "Trish" Rose entered the Air Force through Officer Training School in 1984. Her more notable assignments include mobilization assistant to the director for logistics, engineering, and security assistance, U.S. Pacific Command, and mission director for the U.S. Central Command Deployment and Distribution Operations Center in Southwest Asia, where she directed joint logistics for operations Iraqi Freedom and Enduring Freedom.

On April 21, 2013, General Rose became the first openly LGBT officer to be promoted to the rank of major general. She was nominated to the rank on December 7, 2012, and pinned on May 31, 2013, in a ceremony led by her direct supervisor, General Janet C. Wolfenbarger, the first female four-star general in the United States Air Force. At the time, Maj Gen Rose was assigned as mobilization assistant to the commander, Air Force Materiel Command, Wright-Patterson Air Force Base. Her last active duty assignment was as mobilization assistant to the deputy chief of staff for logistics, engineering and force protection, Headquarters U.S. Air Force, Washington, D.C. In that capacity, she supported the deputy chief of staff in leadership, management and integration of Air Force logistics readiness, aircraft and missile maintenance, civil engineering and security forces, as well as setting policy and preparing budget estimates that reflected enhancements to productivity, combat readiness and quality of life for Air Force members.

Major General Rose retired on 16 June 2017.

== Personal ==
Rose is married to retired Navy LT Julie Roth.

In the 2024 United States presidential election, Rose endorsed Kamala Harris.

== Education ==
- 1983 Bachelor of Arts degree in humanities, Providence College, Rhode Island
- 1988 Squadron Officer School, Maxwell AFB, Alabama
- 1989 Master of Science degree in education, Eastern Illinois University, Charleston, Illinois
- 2000 NATO Reserve Officer's Course, NATO Defense College, Rome, Italy
- 2001 Air Command and Staff College, by correspondence
- 2002 Air War College, by correspondence
- 2003 Reserve Component National Security Course, National Defense University, Fort Lesley J. McNair, Washington, D.C.
- 2007 Strategy and Operations Course, Naval War College, Newport, Rhode Island
- 2009 Advanced Joint Professional Military Education, Joint Forces Staff College, Norfolk, Virginia
- 2011 System Acquisition Management Course, Defense Acquisition University, Fort Belvoir, Virginia
- 2011 Senior Executives in National and International Security, Harvard Kennedy School of Government, Cambridge, Massachusetts
- 2012 Nuclear 400, Air Force Nuclear Weapons Center, Kirkand AFB, New Mexico
- 2012 Air Force Smart Operations (AFSO21), University of Tennessee, Knoxville, Tennessee
- 2012 Pentagon Media Training, Washington, D.C.

== Assignments ==
- April 1984 – September 1984, student, Aircraft Maintenance Officer Course, Chanute Technical Training Center, Rantoul, Illinois
- September 1984 – December 1986, aircraft maintenance officer, Plattsburgh AFB, New York
- January 1987 – January 1991, instructor, Aircraft Maintenance Officer Course, Chanute Technical Training Center, Rantoul, Illinois
- January 1991 – June 1992, air terminal operations center duty officer, Norton AFB, California
- June 1992 – December 1993, quality/transportation officer, Norton and March AFBs, California
- January 1994 – November 1995, air transportation officer, 86th Aerial Port Squadron, McChord AFB, Washington
- December 1995 – June 1996, executive officer, 86th Aerial Port Squadron, McChord AFB, Washington
- June 1996 – July 1998, operations officer, 36th Aerial Port Squadron, McChord AFB, Washington
- July 1998 – February 2003, commander, 36th Aerial Port Squadron, McChord AFB, Washington
- February 2003 – March 2004, deputy commander, 446th Mission Support Group, McChord AFB, Washington
- March 2004 – November 2005, chief, Logistics Resources Branch, Logistics Directorate, Headquarters 4th Air Force, March Air Reserve Base, California
- November 2005 – December 2007, individual mobilization augmentee to the director, global channel operations, Tanker Airlift Control Center, Scott AFB, IL. (May 2007 – September 2007, mission director, CENTCOM Deployment and Distribution Operations Center, Southwest Asia)
- January 2008 – March 2010, mobilization assistant to the director for logistics, engineering and security assistance, U.S. Pacific Command, Camp Smith, Hawaii
- March 2010 – April 2012, mobilization assistant to the director for logistics and sustainment, Headquarters Air Force Materiel Command, Wright-Patterson AFB, Ohio
- April 2012 – April 2015, mobilization assistant to the commander, Air Force Materiel Command, Wright-Patterson Air Force Base, Ohio (December 2014- April 2015, director of logistics, Headquarters Air Force Materiel Command, Wright- Patterson AFB, Ohio)
- April 2015 – June 2017, mobilization assistant to the deputy chief of staff for logistics, engineering and force protection, Headquarters U.S. Air Force, Washington, D.C.

Summary of joint assignments

- May 2007 – September 2007, mission director, CENTCOM Deployment and Distribution Operations Center, Southwest Asia, as a colonel
- January 2008 – March 2010, Mobilization Assistant to the Director for Logistics, Engineering and Security Assistance, U.S. Pacific Command, Camp Smith, Hawaii, as a colonel and brigadier general

== Effective dates of promotion ==
- Second lieutenant – April 13, 1984
- First lieutenant – April 13, 1986
- Captain – April 13, 1988
- Major – March 8, 1996
- Lieutenant colonel – Sept. 29, 2000
- Colonel – May 1, 2004
- Brigadier general – Feb. 2, 2010
- Major general – April 21, 2013

== See also ==
- List of female United States military generals and flag officers
