= Janet C. Wolfenbarger =

United States Air Force general

Janet Carol Wolfenbarger
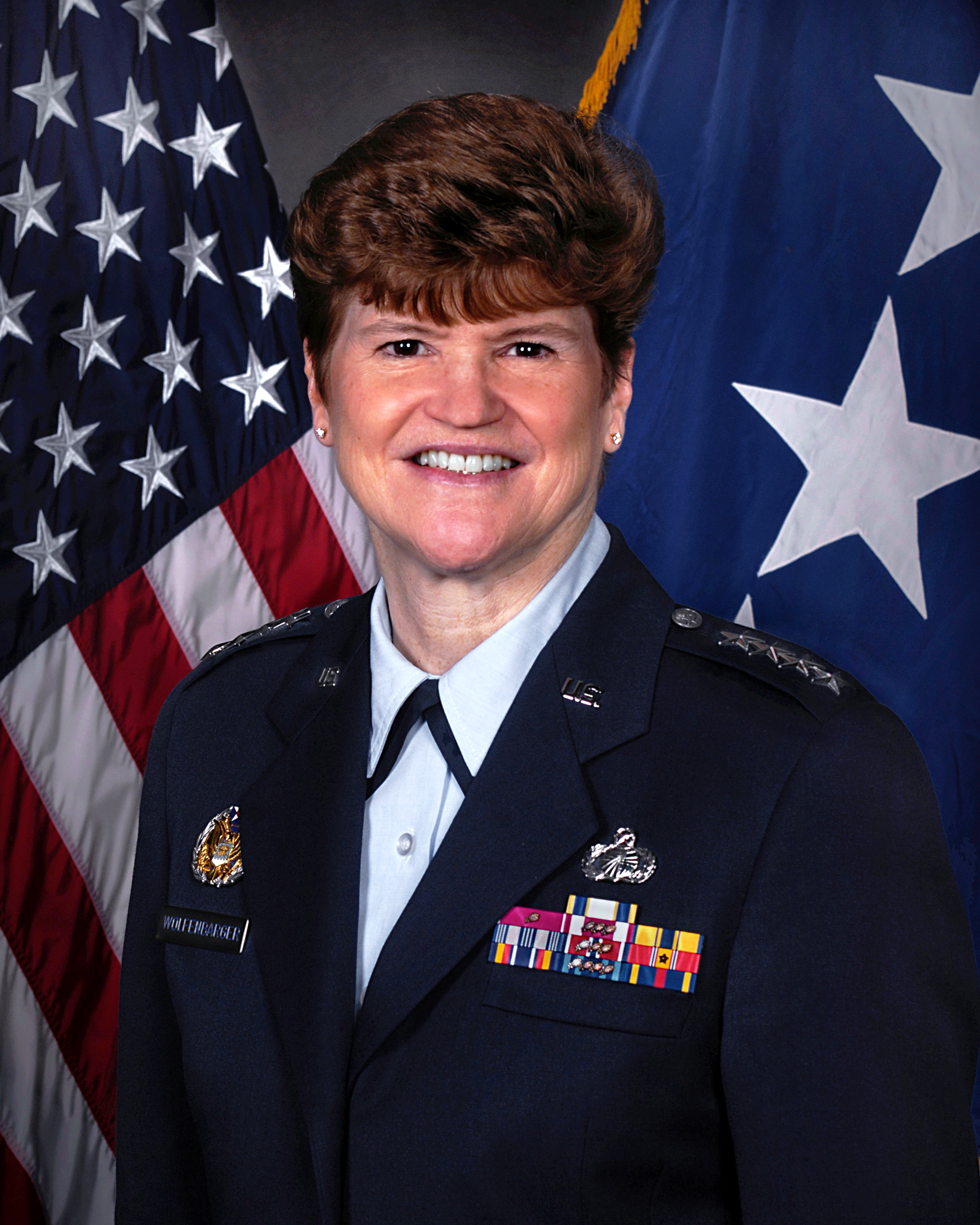
- General Janet Carol Wolfenbarger
- Born: Janet Carol Libby; 1958 (age 67–68); Tampa, Florida, U.S.
- Military career
- Allegiance: United States of America
- Branch: United States Air Force
- Service years: 1980–2015
- Rank: General
- Commands: Air Force Materiel Command; C-17 Systems Group
- Awards: Air Force Distinguished Service Medal (2); Legion of Merit (2)

Janet Carol Wolfenbarger (née Libby; born 1958) is a retired United States Air Force four-star general who served as the eighth commander of Air Force Materiel Command from June 5, 2012, to June 8, 2015. She was the first woman to achieve the rank of four-star general in the Air Force. Wolfenbarger retired from the Air Force after over 35 years of service.

== Military career ==
Wolfenbarger was born in Tampa, Florida. She was commissioned as a graduate of the U.S. Air Force Academy Class of 1980 - the first class to contain female cadets. She began her career in acquisition as an engineer at Eglin Air Force Base, Florida. Along with her various duty assignments she furthered her education with a Master of Science degree in aeronautics and astronautics from the Massachusetts Institute of Technology in 1985 and another Master of Science degree in national resource strategy from Industrial College of the Armed Forces in 1994. She is also a graduate of the Air Command and Staff College. Her major awards and decorations include the Legion of Merit and the Meritorious Service Medal.

Wolfenbarger was the U.S. Air Force's highest-ranking woman, a distinction held until January 1, 2010, by Lt. Gen. Terry Gabreski, whom Wolfenbarger succeeded at Wright-Patterson.

On February 6, 2012, President Obama nominated Wolfenbarger to become the first woman four-star general for the Air Force. This was confirmed by the US Senate on March 26, 2012, and she assumed her new rank, and became Commander, Air Force Materiel Command, on June 5, 2012.

Wolfenbarger graduated from Beavercreek High School in Beavercreek, Ohio, in 1976. She is the daughter of Eldon and Shirley Libby of Paicines, California. She is married to Craig "Wolf" Wolfenbarger.

== Education ==
1976 Beavercreek High School, Beavercreek, Ohio
1980 Bachelor of Science degree in engineering sciences, U.S. Air Force Academy, Colorado Springs, Colo.
1983 Squadron Officer School, by correspondence
1985 Master of Science degree in aeronautics and astronautics, Massachusetts Institute of Technology, Cambridge
1988 Program Management Course, Defense Systems Management College, Fort Belvoir, Va.
1991 Air Command and Staff College, by correspondence
1994 Master of Science degree in national resource strategy, Industrial College of the Armed Forces, National Defense University, Fort Lesley J. McNair, Washington, D.C.

== Assignments ==
1. July 1980 – August 1981, technical intelligence analyst, Armament Division, Eglin AFB, Fla.
2. August 1981 – July 1983, communication systems development officer, Electronic Security Command, Kelly AFB, Texas
3. July 1983 – December 1984, student, Massachusetts Institute of Technology, Cambridge, Mass.
4. December 1984 – October 1987, Chief, Strategic Offense Weapons Branch, Headquarters Air Force Systems Command, Andrews AFB, Md.
5. October 1987 – September 1988, executive officer, Headquarters Air Force Systems Command, Andrews AFB, Md.
6. September 1988 – July 1993, Chief, Plans and Strategies Division; Chief, Air Vehicle Analysis and Integration Team; and Chief, F-22 Subsystems Team, F-22 System Program Office, Aeronautical Systems Center, Wright-Patterson AFB, Ohio
7. July 1993 – June 1994, student, Industrial College of the Armed Forces, National Defense University, Fort Lesley J. McNair, Washington, D.C.
8. June 1994 – June 1997, Lead F-22 Program Element Monitor, Office of the Assistant Secretary of the Air Force for Acquisition, the Pentagon, Washington, D.C.
9. June 1997 – April 2000, Chief, B-2 Air Vehicle Team, B-2 SPO, ASC, Wright-Patterson AFB, Ohio
10. April 2000 – December 2002, B-2 System Program Director, B-2 SPO, ASC, Wright-Patterson AFB, Ohio
11. December 2002 – July 2005, Commander, C-17 Systems Group, Mobility Systems Wing, ASC, Wright-Patterson AFB, Ohio
12. August 2005 – July 2006, Director, Air Force Acquisition Center of Excellence, Office of the Assistant Secretary of the Air Force for Acquisition, the Pentagon, Washington, D.C.
13. August 2006 – January 2007, Special Assistant for Command Transformation to the Commander, Headquarters Air Force Materiel Command, Wright-Patterson AFB, Ohio
14. January 2007 – July 2008, Director, Intelligence and Requirements Directorate, and Special Assistant for Command Transformation to the Commander, Headquarters AFMC, Wright-Patterson AFB, Ohio
15. July 2008 – December 2009, Director, Intelligence and Requirements Directorate, Headquarters AFMC, Wright-Patterson AFB, Ohio
16. December 2009 – September 2011, Vice Commander, Headquarters Air Force Materiel Command, Wright-Patterson AFB, Ohio
17. September 2011 – June 2012, Military Deputy, Office of the Assistant Secretary of the Air Force for Acquisition, the Pentagon, Washington, D.C.
18. June 2012 – June 2015, Air Force Materiel Command

== Awards and decorations ==
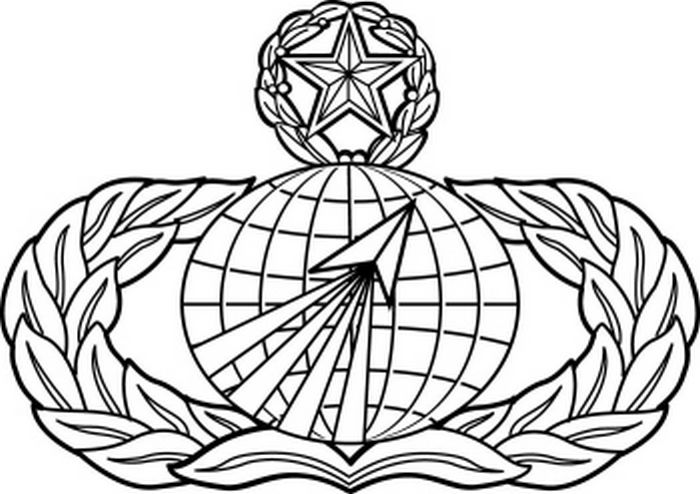
Master Acquisition and Financial Management Badge
Headquarters Air Force Badge

Air Force Distinguished Service Medal with one bronze oak leaf cluster
Legion of Merit with one bronze oak leaf cluster
Meritorious Service Medal with three bronze oak leaf clusters
Air Force Commendation Medal
Air Force Achievement Medal
Air Force Organizational Excellence Award with silver and three bronze oak leaf clusters
National Defense Service Medal with bronze service star
Global War on Terrorism Service Medal
Air Force Longevity Service Award with silver and three bronze oak leaf clusters
Air Force Training Ribbon

=== Other achievements ===
1996 Kelly Burke Award, Department of the Air Force
2002 Stewart Award, Aeronautical Systems Center
2004 Stewart Award, Aeronautical Systems Center
2013 United Service Organizations (USO) Woman of the Year
2014 James Doolittle Award, Massachusetts Institute of Technology Security Studies Program
2014 Seymour E. and Ruth B. Harris Lecturer, John F. Kennedy School of Government, Harvard University
2015 Air Force Materiel Command Order of the Sword
2015 Retroactively prompted change to General Officer Promotion Laws

== Effective dates of promotion ==
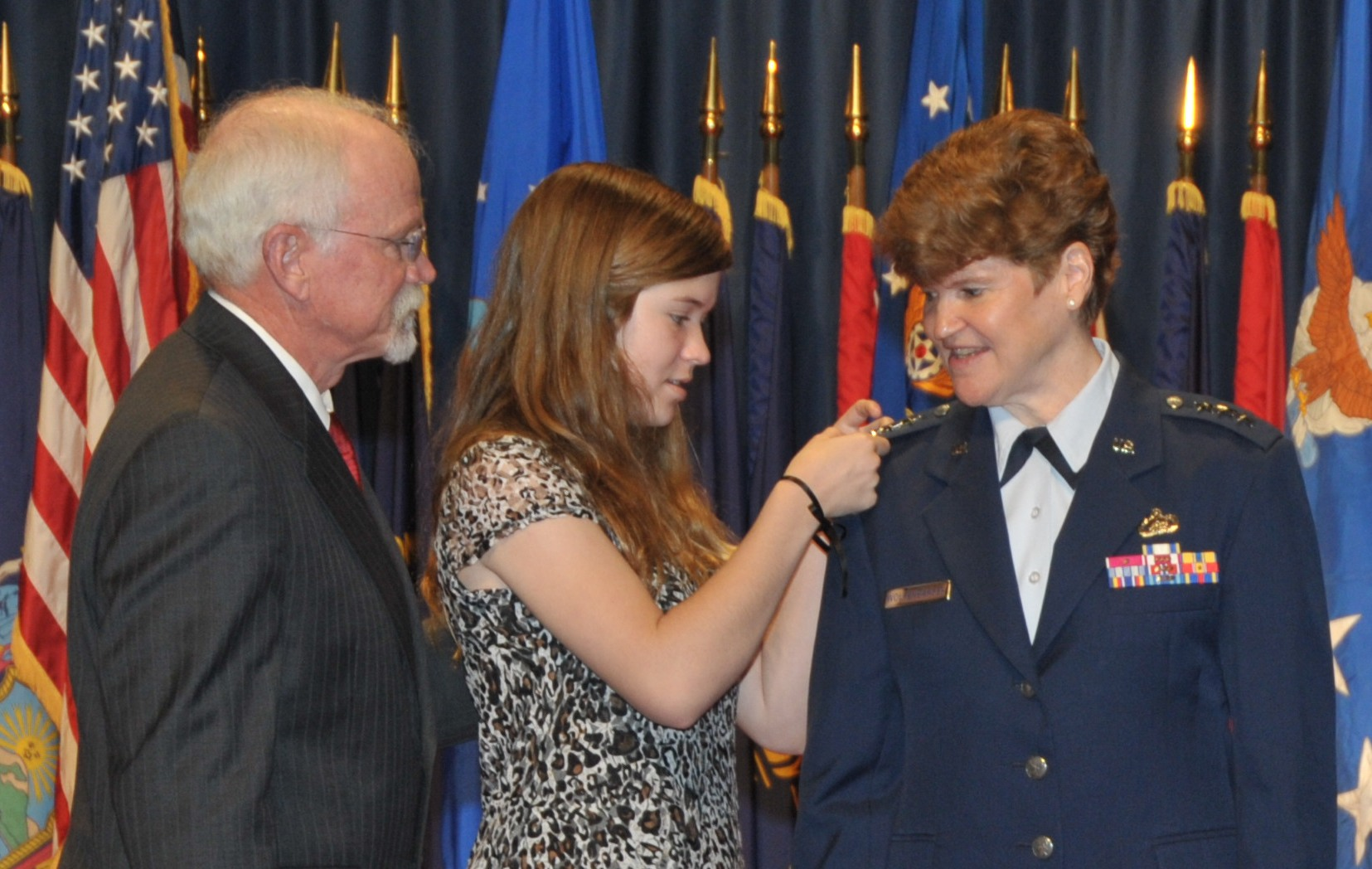
Wolfenbarger is pinned with her fourth star by her daughter, Callie, and her husband, retired Col. Craig Wolfenbarger on June 5, 2012.

Promotions
Insignia	Rank	Date
	General	June 5, 2012
	Lieutenant General	December 3, 2009
	Major General	June 26, 2009
	Brigadier General	February 1, 2006
	Colonel	September 1, 1998
	Lieutenant Colonel	June 1, 1993
	Major	January 1, 1990
	Captain	May 28, 1984
	First Lieutenant	May 28, 1982
	Second Lieutenant	May 28, 1980

== See also ==
- List of female United States military generals and flag officers
