= Maxine Conder =

US Navy rear admiral (1926–2021)

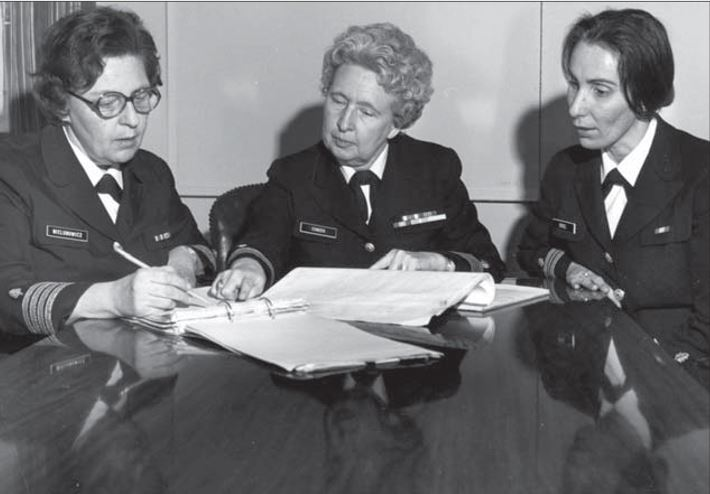
- Conder as Director of the Nurse Corps, with future Directors Mary Nielubowicz (left) and Joan Engel.
- Born: April 20, 1926; Bingham Canyon, Utah, U.S.
- Died: October 18, 2021 (aged 95); Layton, Utah, U.S.
- Military career
- Allegiance: United States of America
- Branch: United States Navy
- Service years: 1951–1979
- Rank: Rear Admiral
- Commands: Director of the United States Navy Nurse Corps
- Awards: Legion of Merit

Rear Admiral Maxine Conder (April 20, 1926 – October 18, 2021) was a United States Navy rear admiral who served as Director of the United States Navy Nurse Corps from 1975 to 1979.

== Early life ==
Conder was born in Utah in 1926. She earned her nursing diploma in 1947 from St. Marks Hospital School of Nursing in Salt Lake City, Utah. She was a member of the Church of Jesus Christ of Latter-day Saints.

== Education ==
In 1962, Conder earned a Bachelor of Science degree from the University of Utah. In 1966, she earned a master's degree in nursing from the University of Washington.

== Navy Nurse Corps career ==
Conder served aboard the hospital ship USS Haven off Korea and in Naval Hospital, Guam, as well as in various stateside assignments.

After several assignments as chief nurse, she was promoted to the rank of captain in 1970.

As Director of the Navy Nurse Corps, she became the second woman promoted to the rank of rear admiral.

== Death ==
Conder died in Layton, Utah, on October 18, 2021, at the age of 95.

== Awards and decorations ==
Conder was awarded the Legion of Merit.

Military offices
| Preceded by Alene B. Duerk | Director, Navy Nurse Corps; 1975–1979 | Succeeded by Frances Shea-Buckley |
