= Johanna Clyborne =

American military officer and lawyer (born 1972)

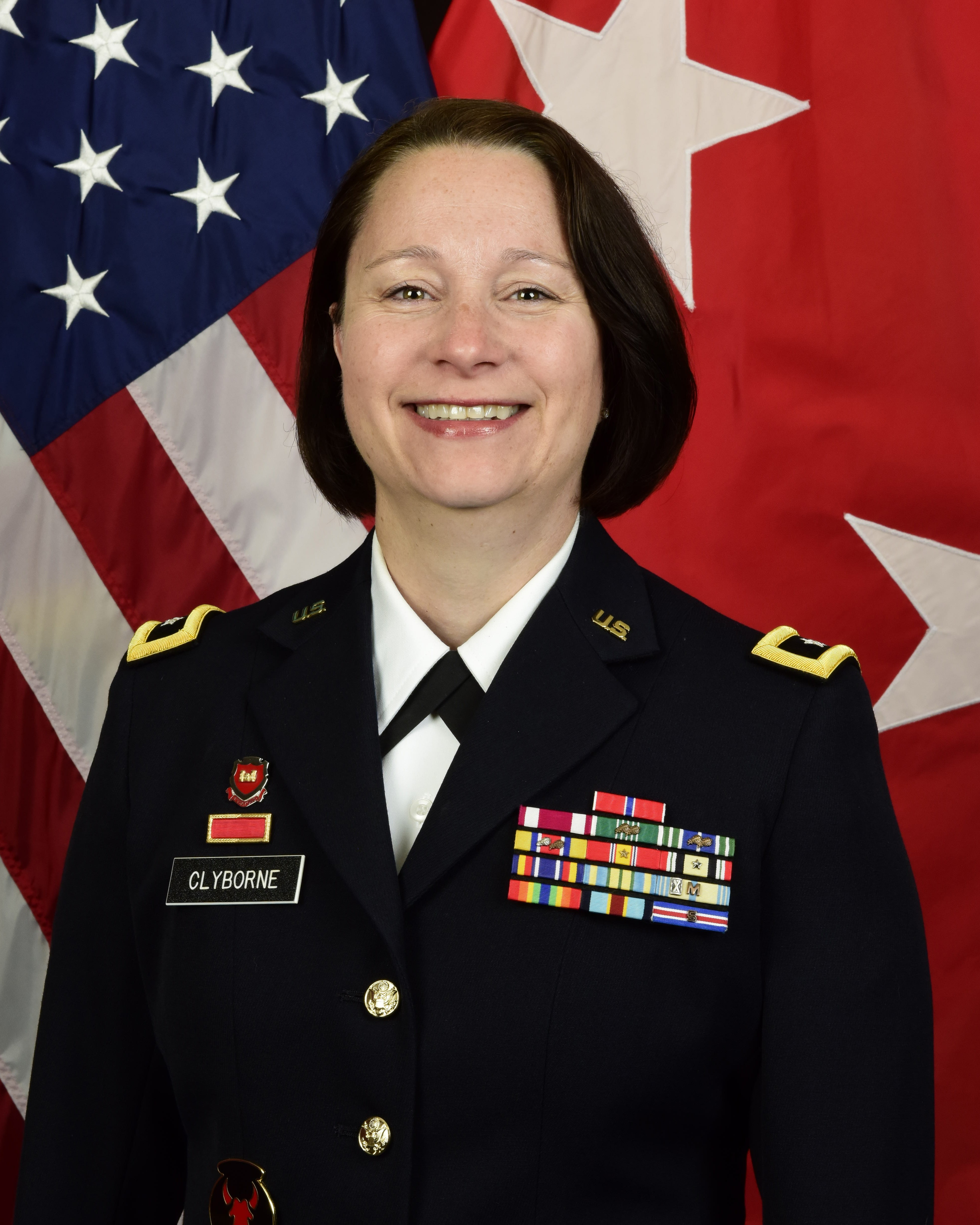

Assistant Adjutant General of Minnesota
- In office June 2019 – September 2024

Assistant Adjutant General of Minnesota
- In office March 2016 – September 2017

Personal details
- Born: 1972 (age 53–54)
- Education: University of Mary Hardin–Baylor (BA); University of St. Thomas School of Law (JD); Tufts University
- Nickname: Jo

Military service
- Allegiance: United States
- Branch/service: United States Army National Guard
- Years of service: 1989–2024
- Rank: Major General
- Unit: 34th Infantry Division
- Commands: 347th Regional Support Group
- Battles/wars: War on terror; Iraq War

Johanna "Jo" P. Clyborne (born 1972) is retired American military officer and lawyer. Clyborne initially served in the Missouri National Guard from 1992 to 1998, before being transferred to the Minnesota National Guard's 34th Infantry Division in 2002. Clyborne served as the Assistant Adjutant General of Minnesota from 2016 to 2017, and again from 2019 to 2024. Clyborne is the first woman in Minnesota National Guard history to hold the rank of Major General and command a Brigade. Clyborne is the second woman overall in Minnesota National Guard history to hold a General officer's rank following Brigadier General Sandra Best.

== Early life and education ==
Clyborne was born in 1972, although a citizen of the United States, Clyborne grew up in the Netherlands as she was a part of a military family which traveled quite frequently. Clyborne's father was a veteran of the Vietnam War, according to Clyborne while growing up “PTSD, alcoholism and domestic violence... was alive and well”.

Clyborne holds a bachelor's degree in Business Administration from the University of Mary Hardin–Baylor and a Juris Doctor law degree from the University of St. Thomas School of Law. Clyborne completed a fellowship at the Fletcher School of Law and Diplomacy at Tufts University.

== Military career ==
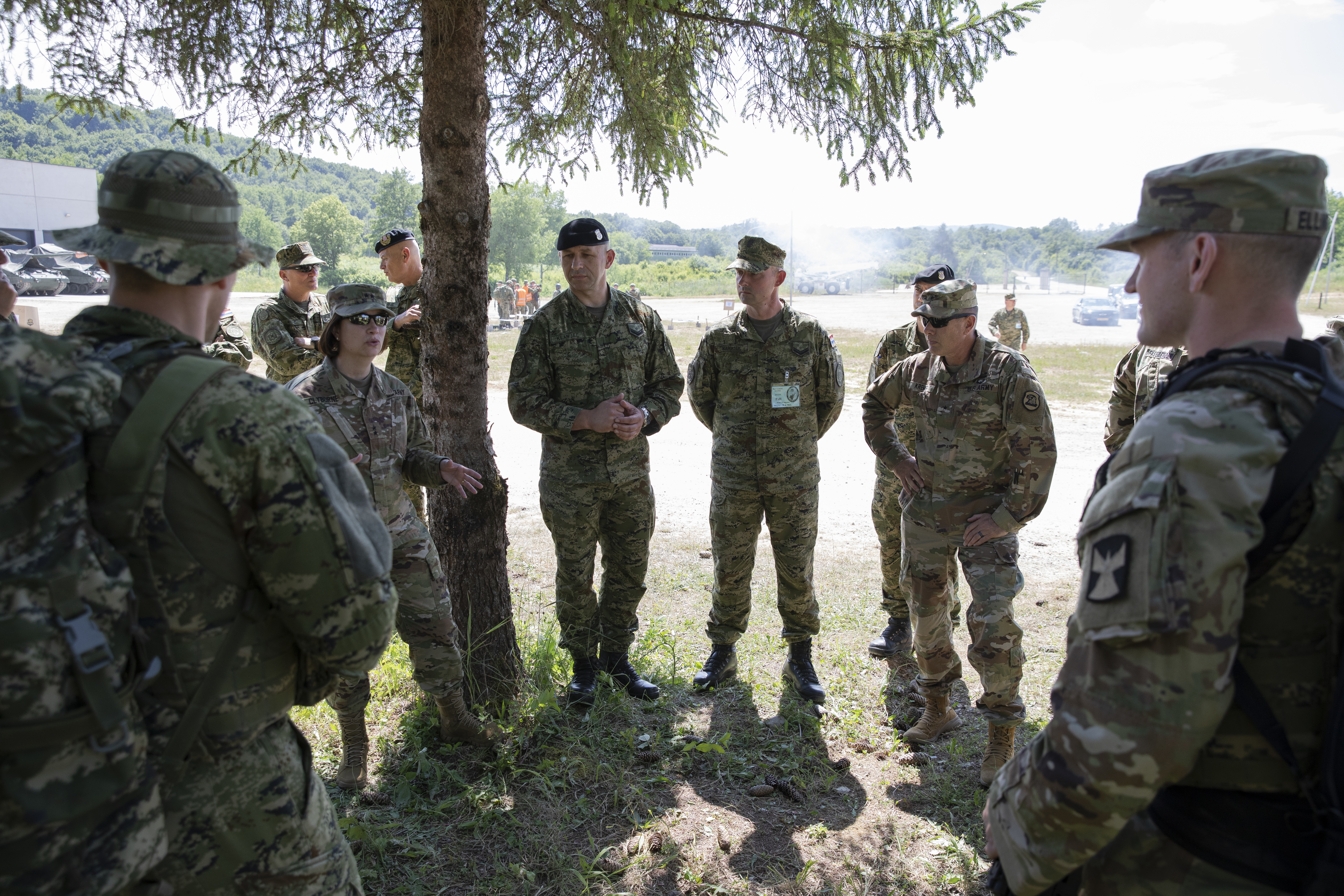
Clyborne (left) speaks to troops completing the Armed Forces of Croatia Best Soldier Competition at the Eugene Kvaternik Military Training Area in Sunja, Croatia on June 16, 2021

Clyborne joined the National Guard on her seventeenth birthday in 1989 as a technical drafting Specialist. Clyborne was commissioned in 1992 as a Second Lieutenant and served as an engineering officer in 203rd Engineer Battalion as part of the Missouri National Guard. While serving in the 203rd Engineers Clyborne was a platoon leader for Company C which was stationed in Carthage, Missouri. Clyborne was promoted to the rank of First Lieutenant on June 12, 1995, and was assigned as a detachment commander for Company C of the 203rd Engineers out of Lamar, Missouri. From 1997 to 2000, Clyborne served in the 40th Infantry Battalion in Los Alamitos, California. Clyborne was promoted to the rank of Captain on May 26, 1999, before being assigned to the Ready Reserve.

Beginning in 2002, Clyborne became a member of the Minnesota National Guard's 34th Infantry Division's support command. On November 21, 2003, Clyborne was promoted to the rank of Major while working as a Material Management Officer in Little Falls, Minnesota. From July 2004 to December 2008, Clyborne was assigned as an Automation Management Officer, Engineer Plans Officer, and Liaison Officer for the 34th Infantry Division before being deployed overseas to Basra in Iraq from December 2008 to June 2010 during the Iraq War. Clyborne was promoted to the rank of Lieutenant Colonel on December 16, 2008.

Clyborne was promoted to the rank of Colonel on March 5, 2013, and commanded the 347th Regional Support Group of the 34th Infantry Division. Clyborne was promoted to the rank of Brigadier General on April 1, 2016, and eventually served as the Chief of the Joint Staff of the Joint Force Headquarters in Saint Paul, Minnesota. From 2016 to 2019, Clyborne served two nonconsecutive appointments as the Assistant Adjutant General of Minnesota. On June 27, 2019, Clyborne was promoted to the rank of Major General. Following 35 years of service Clyborne retired in 2024.

== Law career ==
Outside of her military service Clyborne lives in Minnetonka, Minnesota and works as an attorney. Clyborne is a founding member of the Shakopee-based law firm Brekke, Clyborne and Ribich. Clyborne's primary focus is family law and military related disputes.
