= Judith Fedder =

US Air Force general

Judith Ann Fedder
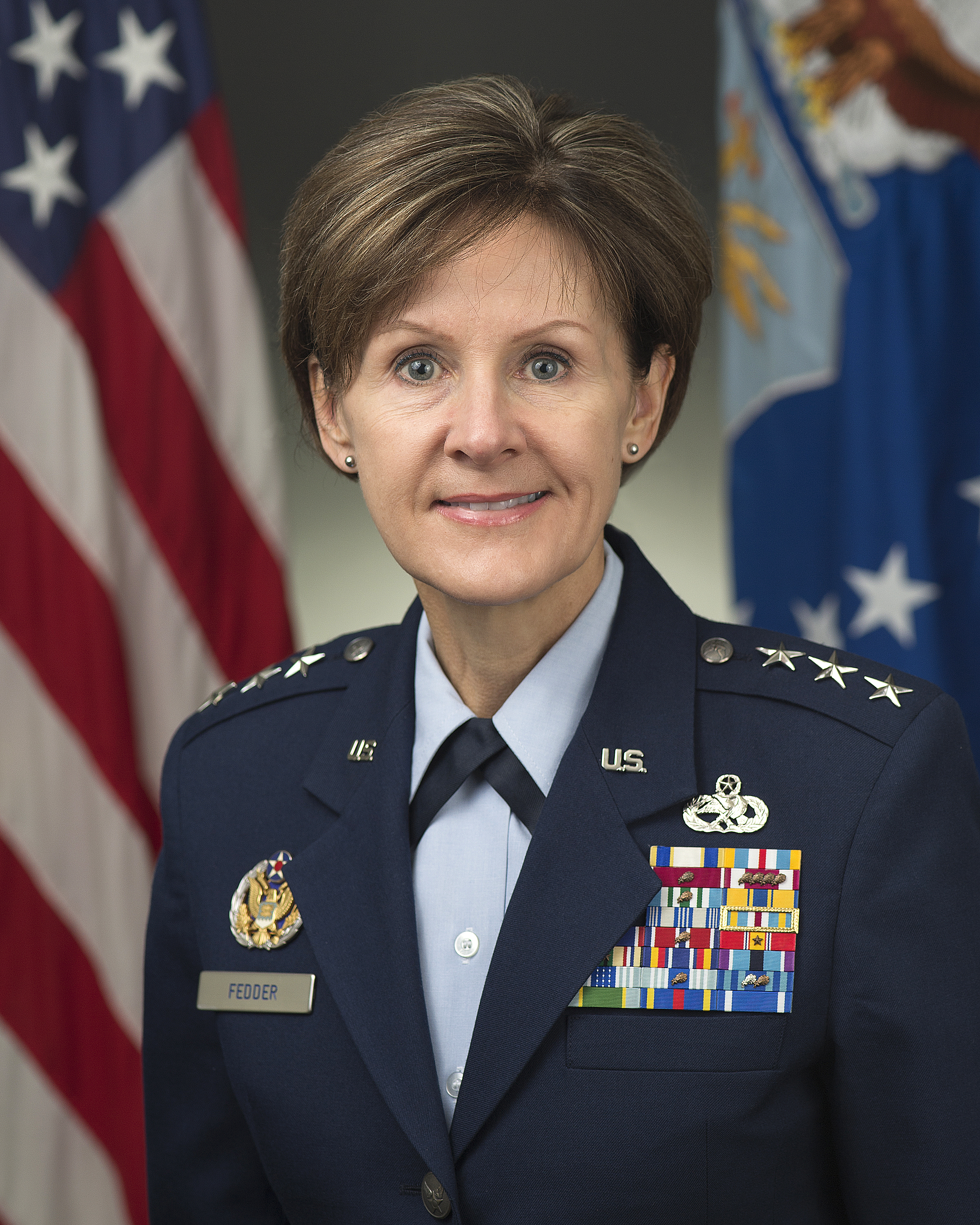
- Lieutenant General Judith A. Fedder
- Born: 1958 (age 67–68)
- Military career
- Allegiance: United States
- Branch: United States Air Force
- Service years: 1980–2015
- Rank: Lieutenant General
- Commands: 76th Maintenance Wing; 65th Air Base Wing; 31st Logistics Group
- Conflicts: Operation Provide Comfort
- Awards: Air Force Distinguished Service Medal; Defense Superior Service Medal; Legion of Merit (2)

Judith Ann Fedder (born 1958) is a retired United States Air Force lieutenant general who served as the Deputy Chief of Staff for Logistics, Installations and Mission Support, Headquarters United States Air Force, The Pentagon, Washington, D.C. Fedder was responsible to the Chief of Staff for leadership, management and integration of Air Force logistics readiness, aircraft and missile maintenance, civil engineering and security forces, as well as setting policy and preparing budget estimates that reflect enhancements to productivity, combat readiness and quality of life for Air Force people.

== Military career ==
Fedder is a 1980 distinguished graduate of the Air Force Reserve Officer Training Corps program at Michigan State University. A career maintainer, she has served as officer in charge of numerous aircraft maintenance units and as Chief of Logistics Management at the Combined Joint Task Force Headquarters for Operations Proven Force and Provide Comfort at Incirlik Air Base, Turkey. Her commands include the 46th Component Repair Squadron and 46th Equipment Maintenance Squadron at Eglin Air Force Base, Florida; 31st Logistics Group at Aviano Air Base, Italy; 65th Air Base Wing at Lajes Air Base, Portugal, where she also served as the Sub-Unified Commander of United States Forces Azores; and the 76th Maintenance Wing at Tinker Air Force Base, Oklahoma. She has served as deputy director in the Office of Legislative Liaison, Secretary of the Air Force; and as the Director of Logistics for Air Combat Command (today "A4 – Directorate of Maintenance and Logistics"). Prior to this assignment, Fedder was the Director of Logistics, Deputy Chief of Staff for Logistics, Installations and Mission Support, Headquarters U.S. Air Force, Washington, D.C. Fedder retired from the Air Force in May 2015.

== Civilian career ==
Following her retirement from the USAF, Fedder became the Director of Global Sales & Marketing, Integrated Logistics at Boeing.

== Education ==
- 1980 Bachelor of Science degree in dietetics, Michigan State University, East Lansing
- 1984 Master of Systems Management degree, Florida Institute of Technology, Melbourne
- 1984 Squadron Officer School, Maxwell AFB, Ala.
- 1992 Distinguished graduate, Air Command and Staff College, Maxwell AFB, Ala.
- 1996 Air War College, Maxwell AFB, Ala.
- 2003 National Security Management Course, Maxwell School, Syracuse University, N.Y.
- 2009 National Security Studies Program, Elliott School, George Washington University, Washington, D.C.
- 2011 Defense Policy Program, Elliott School, George Washington University, Washington, D.C.

== Assignments ==
1. November 1980 – April 1981, student, Aircraft Maintenance Officer Course, Chanute AFB, Ill.
2. April 1981 – May 1984, officer in charge, Maintenance Branch, 1st Equipment Maintenance Squadron; assistance officer in charge, 94th Aircraft Maintenance Unit; and officer in charge, 71st Aircraft Maintenance Unit, 1st Aircraft Generation Squadron, Langley AFB, Va.
3. May 1984 – July 1984, student, Squadron Officer School, Maxwell AFB, Ala.
4. July 1984 – November 1986, officer in charge, 58th Aircraft Maintenance Unit, and officer in charge, William Tell Maintenance, 33rd Aircraft Generation Squadron, Eglin AFB, Fla.
5. November 1986 – June 1991, Chief F-15 and F-5 Section, assistant executive officer and Weapon Systems Program Manager, Deputy Chief of Staff for Logistics, Headquarters U.S. Air Forces in Europe, Ramstein Air Base, Germany
6. July 1991 – June 1992, student, Air Command and Staff College, Maxwell AFB, Ala.
7. June 1992 – July 1995, maintenance supervisor, 46th Equipment Maintenance Squadron; Commander, 46th Component Repair Squadron; and Commander, 46th Equipment Maintenance Squadron, Eglin AFB, Fla.
8. July 1995 – June 1996, student, Air War College, Maxwell AFB, Ala.
9. June 1996 – May 1999, Chief of Manpower and Maintenance Policy, Deputy Chief of Staff for Installations and Logistics, and special assistant for Depot, Readiness and Logistics Programs, Office of Legislative Liaison, Secretary of the Air Force, Washington, D.C.
10. May 1999 – May 2001, Commander, 31st Logistics Group, Aviano AB, Italy
11. August 2001 – May 2003, Commander, 65th Air Base Wing, and Commander, U.S. Forces Azores, Lajes Field, Portugal
12. May 2003 – September 2005, executive officer to the Chief of Staff, Headquarters U.S. Air Force, Washington, D.C.
13. September 2005 – July 2006, deputy director of Legislative Liaison, Office of the Secretary of the Air Force, Washington, D.C.
14. July 2006 – January 2009, Commander, 76th Maintenance Wing, Oklahoma City ALC, Tinker AFB, Okla.
15. January 2009 – October 2010, Director of Logistics, Headquarters Air Combat Command, Langley AFB, Va.
16. November 2010 – November 2011, Director of Logistics, Deputy Chief of Staff for Logistics, Installations and Mission Support, Headquarters U.S. Air Force, Washington, D.C.
17. December 2011 – May 2015, Deputy Chief of Staff for Logistics, Installations and Mission Support, Headquarters U.S. Air Force, Washington, D.C.

== Awards and decorations ==
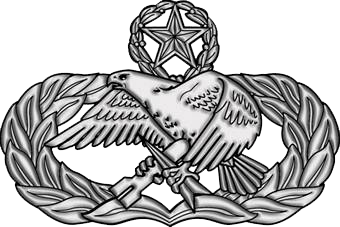
Master Maintenance Badge
Headquarters Air Force Badge

Air Force Distinguished Service Medal
Defense Superior Service Medal
Legion of Merit with bronze oak leaf cluster
Meritorious Service Medal with four bronze oak leaf clusters
Joint Service Commendation Medal with bronze oak leaf cluster
Air Force Commendation Medal
Air Force Achievement Medal
Joint Meritorious Unit Award
Air Force Outstanding Unit Award
Air Force Organizational Excellence Award with bronze oak leaf cluster
National Defense Service Medal with bronze service star
Southwest Asia Service Medal
Global War on Terrorism Service Medal
Humanitarian Service Medal
Air Force Overseas Short Tour Service Ribbon
Air Force Overseas Long Tour Service Ribbon with bronze oak leaf cluster
Air Force Longevity Service Award with silver and two bronze oak leaf clusters
Small Arms Expert Marksmanship Ribbon
Air Force Training Ribbon
NATO Medal for Former Yugoslavia

== Effective dates of promotion ==
Promotions
Insignia	Rank	Date
	Lieutenant General	December 5, 2011
	Major General	July 17, 2009
	Brigadier General	April 10, 2006
	Colonel	May 1, 1999
	Lieutenant Colonel	February 1, 1995
	Major	October 1, 1991
	Captain	November 20, 1984
	First Lieutenant	November 20, 1982
	Second Lieutenant	November 20, 1980

== See also ==
- List of female United States military generals and flag officers
