= Linda M. Marsh =

U.S. Air Force general

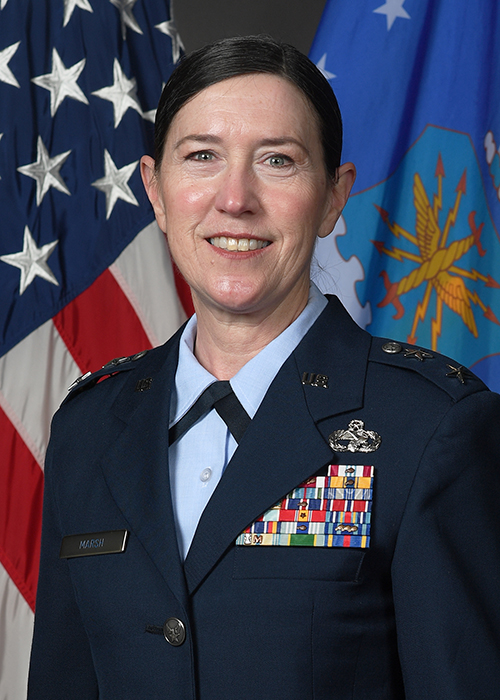
- Military career
- Allegiance: United States
- Branch: United States Air Force
- Service years: 1987–2021
- Rank: Major General
- Commands: 603rd Materiel Flight

Linda M. Marsh is a retired United States Air Force major general who last served as the Deputy Director of Logistics Operations of the Joint Staff. Previously, she was the Mobilization Assistant to the Commander of the Air Force Materiel Command.

Military offices
| Preceded by ??? | Mobilization Assistant to the Commander of the Air Force Sustainment Center; 2017–2018 | Succeeded by Maureen G. Banavige |
| Preceded by ??? | Mobilization Assistant to the Commander of the Air Force Materiel Command; 2018–2019 | Succeeded by Maureen G. Banavige |
| Preceded by ??? | Deputy Director of Logistics Operations of the Joint Staff; 2019–present | Incumbent |
