= Laura M. Dickey =

U.S. Coast Guard admiral

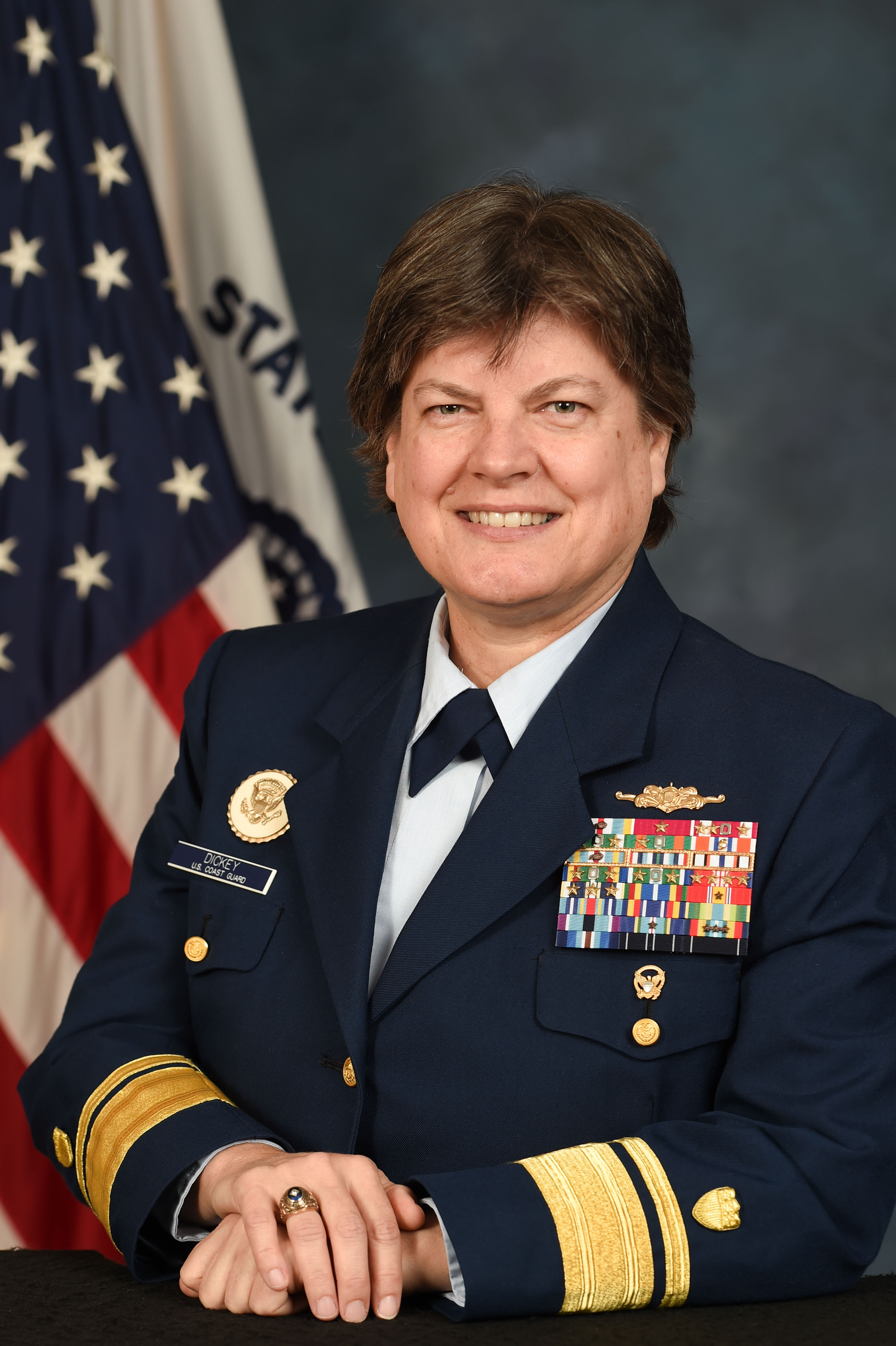
- Military career
- Allegiance: United States
- Branch: United States Coast Guard
- Service years: 1990–2025
- Rank: Rear Admiral
- Awards: Defense Superior Service Medal; Legion of Merit

Laura M. Dickey is a retired United States Coast Guard Rear Admiral who last served as the deputy for operations policy and capabilities of the United States Coast Guard from 2024 to 2025. She previously served as deputy for materiel readiness from 2023 to 2024, and as deputy commander of the Coast Guard Atlantic Area from 2022 to 2023. She commanded the Fifth Coast Guard District from 2020 to 2022.

== Early life and education ==
Dickey was born in Wilmington, North Carolina. Her father was a graduate of the US Coast Guard Academy who was later stationed near Wilmington and the East Coast.

In 1986, Dickey graduated from New Hanover High School in Wilmington, North Carolina. After high school graduation, Dickey attended the U.S. Coast Guard Academy, graduating in 1990 with a Bachelor of Science in Government. In 2002, Dickey graduated with a Juris Doctor from the University of North Carolina School of Law

She is licensed to practice law in North Carolina.

== Military service ==
After graduating from the US Coast Guard Academy, Dickey became a cutterman performing search and rescue, coastal law enforcement and homeland protection. She later attended the Naval Justice School, graduating with honors.

Dickey served as the Deputy Director of Operations for United States Northern Command. She has also served as then-Vice President of the United States Joseph Biden’s Special Advisor for Homeland Security, Counterterrorism and Africa.

She has been stationed throughout the globe including the Arctic, Latin America, the Bering Sea, the Middle East, and the Caribbean.

In 2012, Dickey graduated from the U.S. Naval War College with a Master of Arts in National Security and Strategic Studies.

On April 27, 2018, the US Coast Guard promoted Dickey to the rank of Rear Admiral. At the time, she became only one of eight women to be promoted to US Coast Guard Rear Admiral.

In September 2020, Dickey became the commander of the Fifth Coast Guard District. She relinquished command in May 2022 to Shannon N. Gilreath.

== Awards and commendations ==
- Defense Superior Service Medal
- Coast Guard Achievement Medal - 2X
- Legion of Merit
- Meritorious Service Medal - 4X
- Coast Guard Commendation Medals - 3X
- Vice Presidential Service Badge
