= Alma M. Grocki =

Retired American Navy admiral

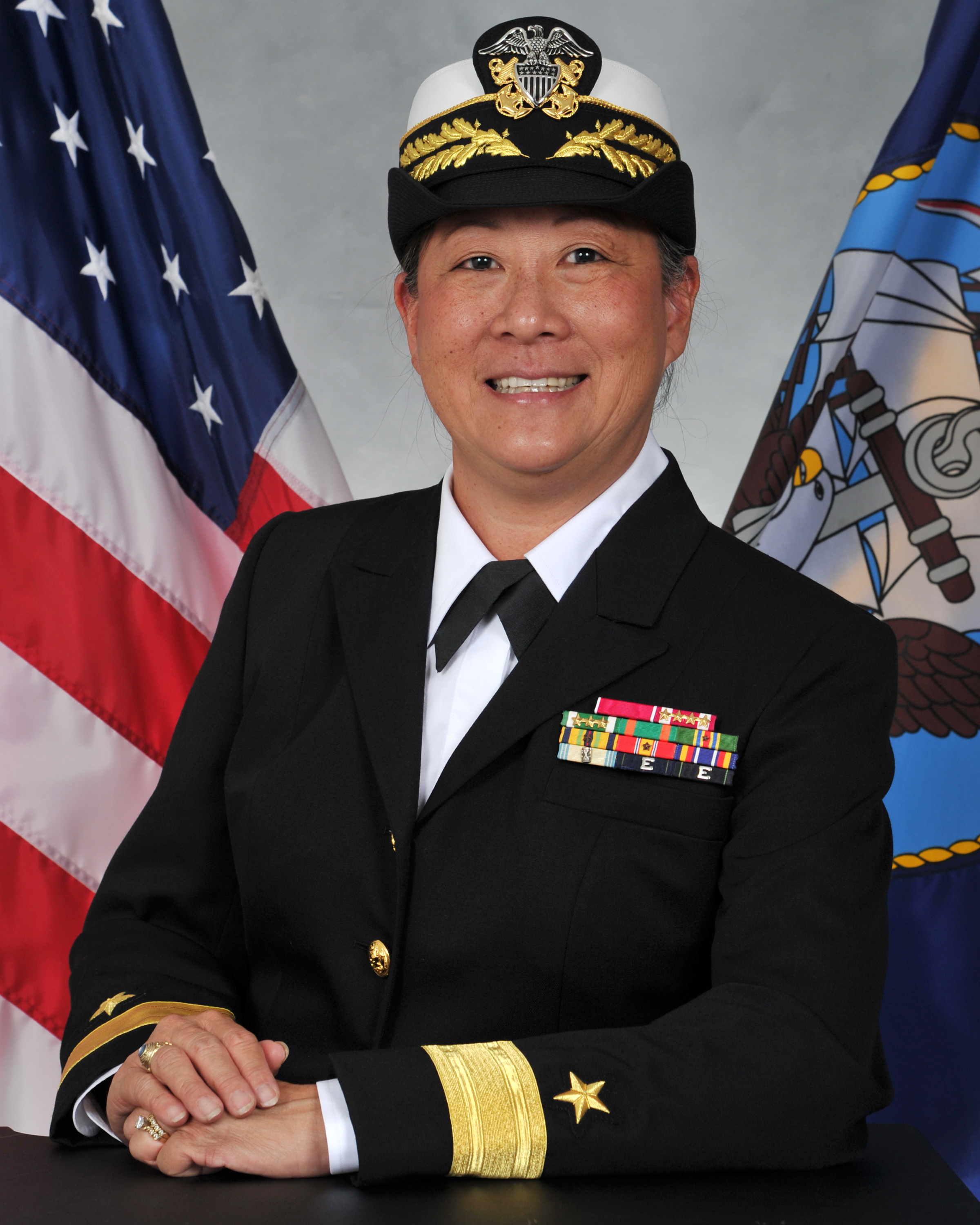
- Grocki in 2013
- Born: Honolulu, Hawaii, U.S.
- Spouse: Russ Grocki
- Children: Nick and Dan Grocki
- Military career
- Allegiance: United States
- Branch: U.S. Navy
- Service years: 1977–2016
- Rank: Rear admiral
- Awards: Legion of Merit (three awards); Meritorious Service Medal (five awards); Navy and Marine Corps Commendation Medal (four awards)

Alma M. Grocki is a retired United States Navy rear admiral. After graduating from the United States Naval Academy in 1981, she served in a succession of warship and submarine maintenance postings before transferring to the United States Navy Reserve in 1988. Grocki commanded various U.S. Navy facilities, shipyards and programs before becoming director of fleet maintenance for the United States Pacific Fleet and deputy commander of Naval Sea Systems Command.

Grocki retired in October 2016, at which point she was the senior engineering duty officer (EDO) in the U.S. Navy Reserve. She played a key role in the creation of insignia for EDO role, which was authorized for wear in January 2018. In her civilian career she has worked for CACI Dynamic Systems and also serves voluntarily as a Blue and Gold Officer (BGO) (volunteer admissions counselor) for the Naval Academy.

== U.S. Navy career ==
Born in Honolulu, Hawaii, as Alma Lau, Grocki attended Punahou School, where she was two years ahead of future U.S. President Barack Obama. Her father was a civil service employee and general foreman for 39 years, working on submarine maintenance at the Pearl Harbor Naval Shipyard. Grocki joined the United States Naval Academy's second class of women in 1977 and was the first woman from her state to enter the academy. She states that a good sense of humor and relying on friends and classmates as well as liberal amount of "aloha spirit" helped her through the academy. She graduated from the academy in 1981 with a Bachelor of Science degree.

Grocki's first posting was as non-nuclear ship superintendent of the submarine USS Tullibee (SSN-597) at Portsmouth Naval Shipyard in Kittery, Maine. At Portsmouth she served in the same role for the experimental submarine NR-1 and completed a Master of Science degree in mechanical engineering at the nearby University of New Hampshire. Grocki returned to her home state to serve as billeting officer at Naval Station Pearl Harbor. She later served at the station's shipyard and in 1985 was admitted as an engineering duty officer (EDO). At Pearl Harbor she was ship superintendent and senior ship superintendent for several surface warships and submarines. She became the first female superintendent to accompany a vessel on sea trials and, after completing the Nuclear Ship Superintendent School, served as shipyard docking officer and nuclear ship superintendent during the decommissioning of the submarines USS Skate (SSN-578) in 1986 and USS Sargo (SSN-583) in 1988.

== Navy Reserve ==
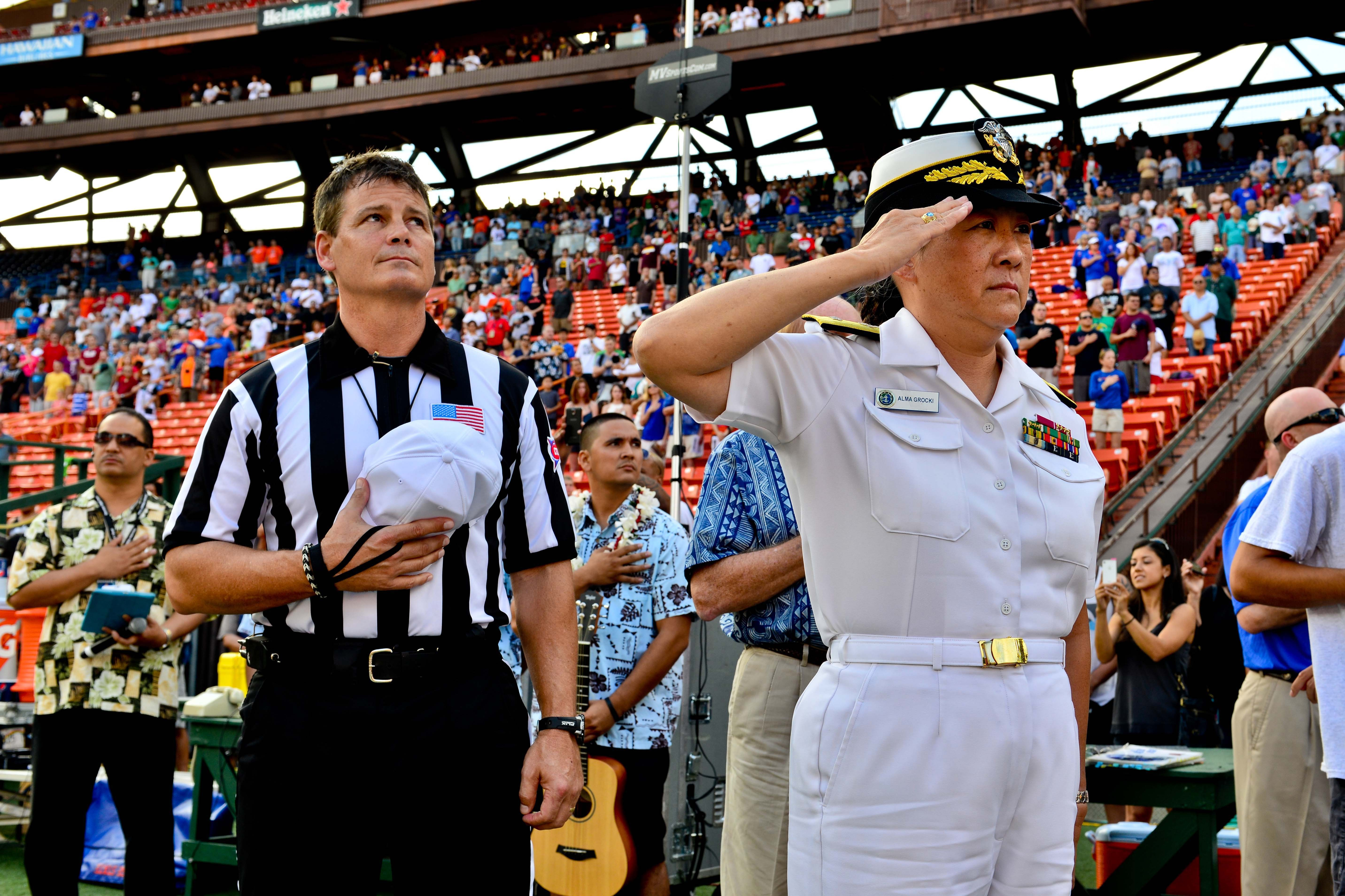
Grocki at the 2013 Hawaii Bowl

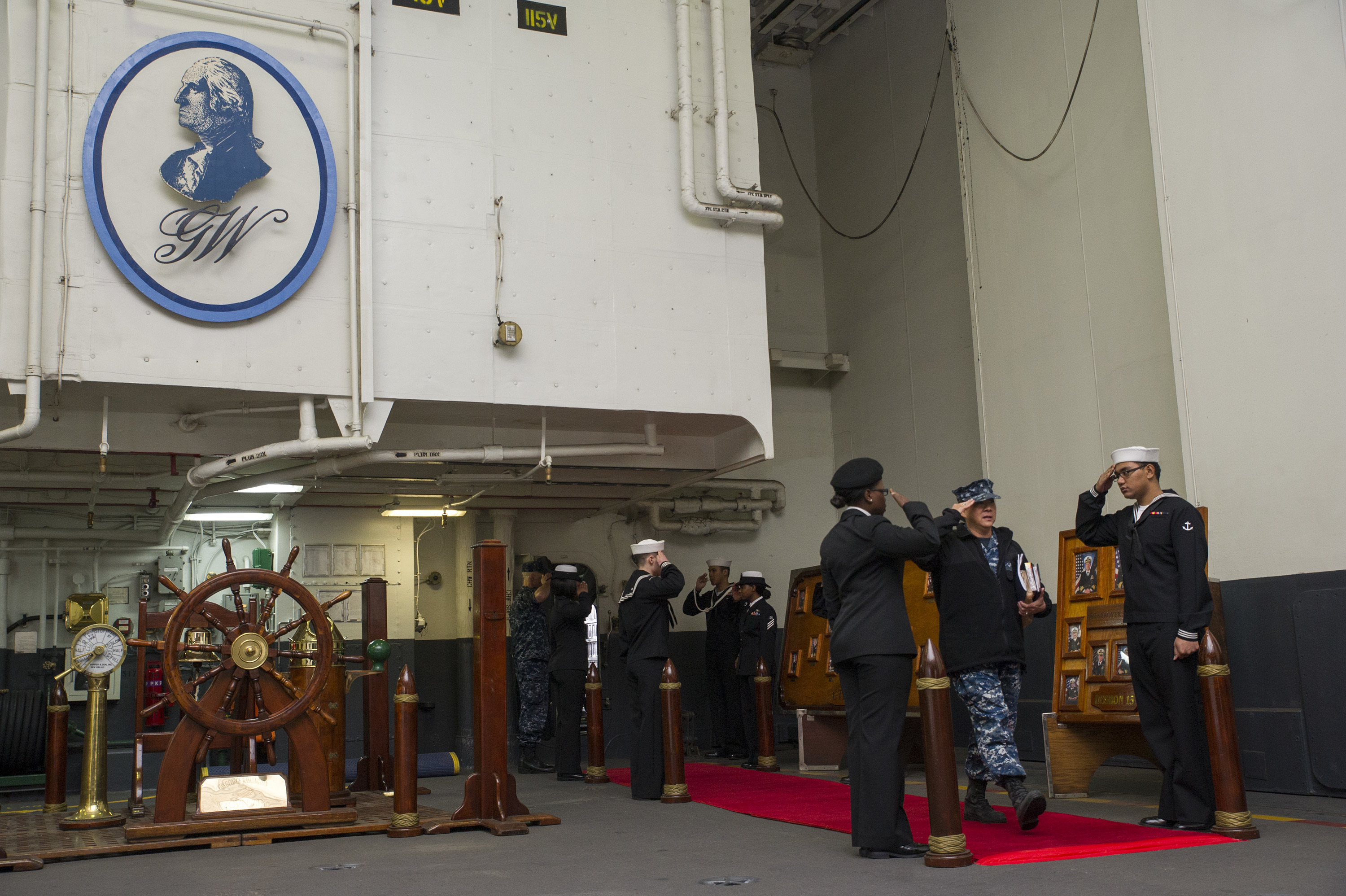
Grocki boarding the USS George Washington in 2015

Grocki transferred to the United States Navy Reserve in 1988. She served as commanding officer of shore maintenance facilities in Portsmouth and at Naval Station Everett in Everett, Washington, and of the Navy Reserve shipyard at Puget Sound Naval Shipyard and Intermediate Maintenance Facility in Bremerton, Washington. She also commanded the Navy Reserve Naval Submarine Support Command, Pearl Harbor; Naval Undersea Warfare Command, Keyport, Washington; and Naval Sea Systems Command (NAVSEA) 102 at Bremerton. Grocki was the first national director of the Navy Reserve's SurgeMain shipyard workforce recruitment programme and served as commanding officer of the NAVSEA headquarters unit and as chief of staff for its naval reactors division.

Grocki later served on active duty as deputy operations officer of the Pearl Harbor Naval Shipyard and director of submarine maintenance for the United States Pacific Fleet. She was later recalled to active duty to serve as director of fleet maintenance for the Pacific Fleet and was deputy commander of Naval Sea Systems Command. Grocki was awarded the Legion of Merit three times, the Meritorious Service Medal five times, and the Navy and Marine Corps Commendation Medal four times in the course of her Navy career.

== Civilian career and personal life ==
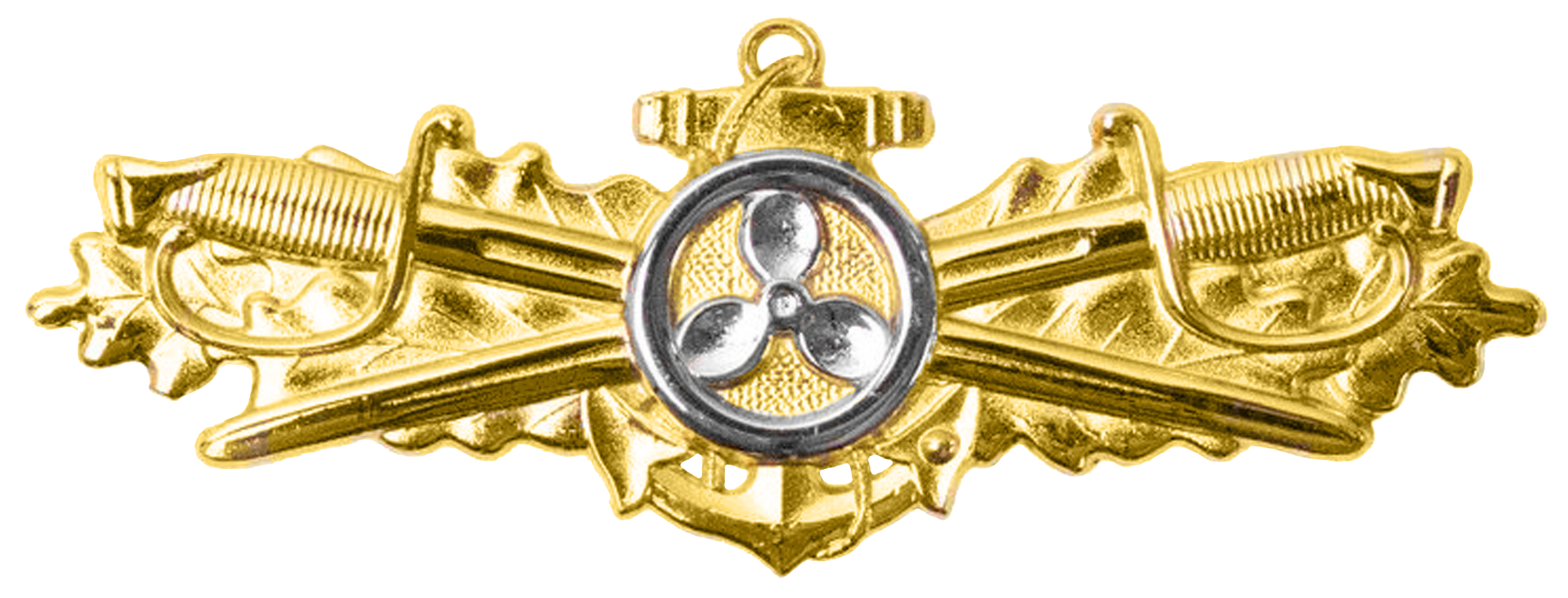
EDO breast insignia

Grocki retired in October 2016, at which point she was the senior EDO in the Navy Reserve. She played a key role in the creation of the breast insignia for the EDO role which was authorized for wear in January 2018.

During her civilian career she has worked for CACI Dynamic Systems to provide shipyard training, audits of NAVSEA dry docks, and fleet maintenance information technology programs. She is a Blue and Gold Officer (BGO) (volunteer admissions counselor) for the U.S. Naval Academy and coordinates the academy's BGO operations in the Western Pacific, including applicants from high schools and within the Navy and United States Marine Corps. She also worked on the U.S. Navy's commemoration of the 75th anniversary of the attack on Pearl Harbor in 2016, the 50th anniversary commemoration of the Vietnam War, and Veterans Day 2017.

Alma married Russ Grocki in 1992. They were in the same company at the U.S. Naval Academy and were friends, but did not date, and after graduation, did not meet again until 1991. Russ was a nuclear submarine officer and reconnected with Alma when stationed at Mare Island Naval Shipyard in Vallejo, California. He was the commanding officer of the submarine USS Cavalla (SSN-684). They have two sons, Dan and Nick. Russ had to return to sea as executive officer of the ballistic missile submarine USS Alaska (SSBN-732) for a six-month deployment three weeks after the birth of Nick, so Alma played daily videos of Russ so that Nick would become familiar with his father's face and voice. Alma lives in Hawaii with her husband, who retired in 2011. Dan and Nick followed in their parents' footsteps, with Dan joining the Navy and Nick the Reserve Officers' Training Corps.
