= Meredith L. Austin =

US Coast Guard officer (born c. 1963)

Rear Admiral Meredith L. Austin
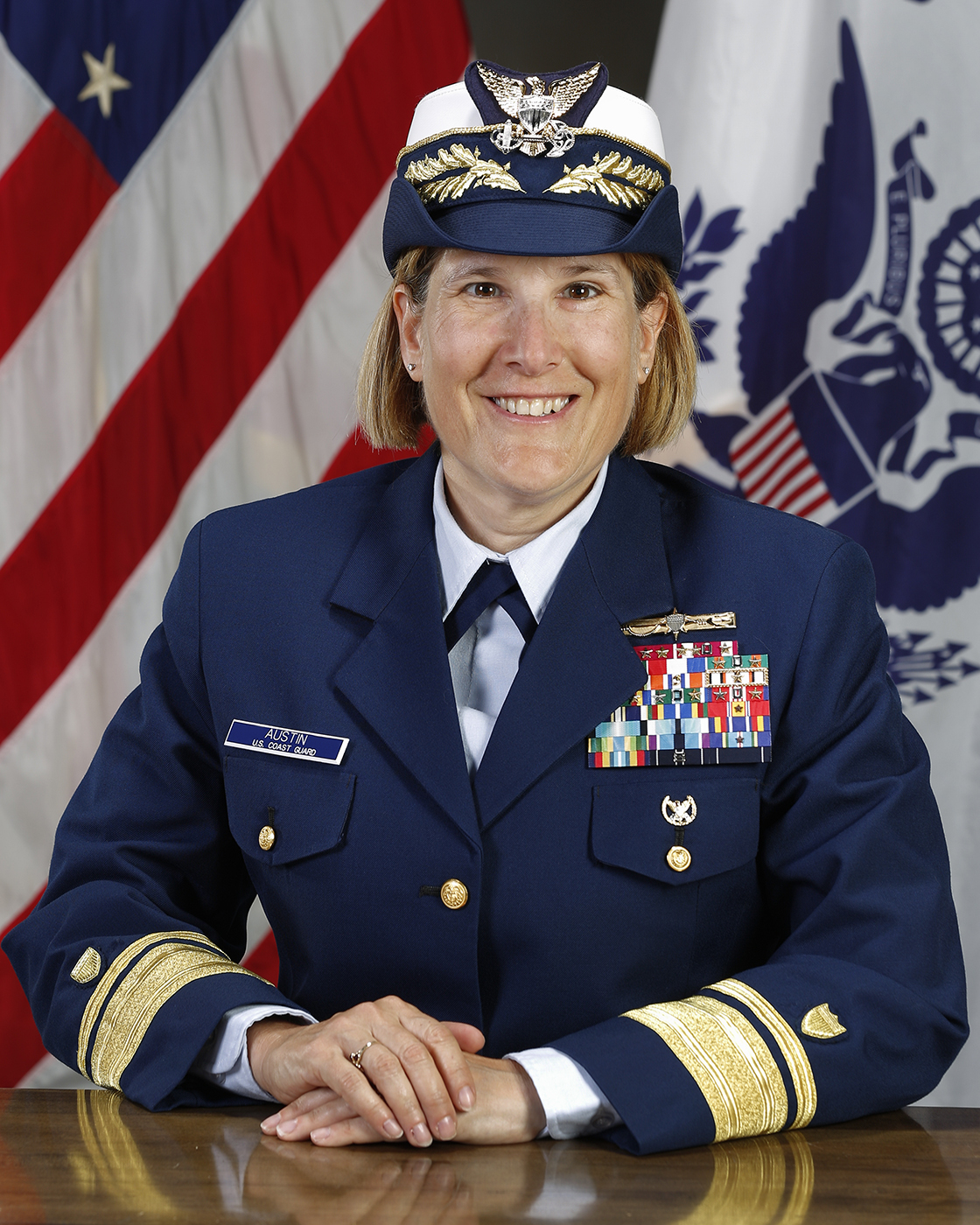
- Rear Admiral Meredith L. Austin, USCG, c. 2019
- Born: c. 1963 (age 62–63)
- Education: United States Coast Guard Academy (BS); University of North Carolina-Chapel Hill (MS); Naval Postgraduate School (MA)
- Military career
- Allegiance: United States
- Branch: United States Coast Guard
- Service years: 1985-2021
- Rank: Rear Admiral (upper half)
- Commands: USCG Fifth District

Rear Admiral Meredith L. Austin (born c. 1963) is a retired United States Coast Guard officer who served as the Acting Deputy Assistant Secretary for Incident Command and Control within the Office of the Assistant Secretary Preparedness and Response (ASPR) since February 2020 to December 2020.

== Education ==
Austin graduated from the United States Coast Guard Academy in 1985 with a degree in Marine Science. She earned a Master of Science in Public Health in Industrial Hygiene from the University of North Carolina-Chapel Hill in 1994 and a Master of Arts in Homeland Security from the Naval Postgraduate School in Monterey, California in 2007. Austin is a NIMS certified Type I Incident Commander, and has earned the designations of Certified Industrial Hygienist and Certified Emergency Manager.

== Coast Guard career ==
Austin is the acting Deputy Assistant Secretary for Incident Command and Control within the Office of the Assistant Secretary Preparedness and Response (ASPR). Austin also oversees the leadership team managing the Department's Continuity of Operations Program (COOP), Critical Infrastructure Program (CIP), and the HHS Secretary's Operations Center (SOC). In addition, Austin serves as the ASPR Deputy Director of the Joint Coordination Cell (JCC).

Prior to her assignment to HHS in February 2020, Austin was the Coast Guard Deputy for Operations, Policy and Capabilities. In this capacity, she was responsible for establishing and providing operational strategy, policy, capability and resources to meet national priorities for U.S. Coast Guard missions, programs and services.

Austin has held several commands including Fifth District Commander; Sector Delaware Bay, executing the Coast Guard's 11 statutory missions along the coasts of New Jersey, Delaware, and Pennsylvania; the Pacific Strike Team and the National Strike Force, responding to oil and hazardous substance spills and threats from Weapons of Mass Destruction in support of Coast Guard, Environmental Protection Agency and Department of Defense On-Scene Coordinators throughout the United States, its territories, and other nations.
