= Linda Urrutia-Varhall =

Linda R. Urrutia-Varhall
- Spouse: Lt. Col. Gregory Varhall
- Children: 3
- Military career
- Branch: United States Air Force
- Service years: 1984-2022
- Rank: Major General
- Nickname: "UV"

Linda R. Urrutia-Varhall was the first Hispanic female Air Force major general.

== Early life ==
She is from Pueblo, Colorado born to Richard (a Pepsi plant manager) and Dee Urrutia, and is of Mexican descent. She graduated from Pueblo's Central High School in 1979.

== Military career ==
Urrutia-Varhall graduated from the U.S. Air Force Academy in 1984. And earned her master's of science from the Defense Intelligence College in 1990.

She began her career as a squadron executive officer of the 544th Intelligence Analysis Squadron, Offutt AFB, Nebraska in 1987. And has served at the Pentagon, Hawaii, Ramstein Germany, Kunsan Air Base South Korea among the 63 countries she worked in while in the Air Force. In 1998, she was the commander of the first Air Force Information Warfare Flight at 9th Air Force/Central Air Forces, Shaw AFB, South Carolina. She also deployed to Southwest Asia where she served as Chief, Analysis Division and an operations officer for the Joint Intelligence Center at U.S. Central Command Headquarters Forward. She was the director of operations at the National Geospatial-Intelligence Agency as well as the assistant deputy chief of staff, Intelligence, Surveillance and Reconnaissance (ISR) for the U.S. Air Force.

== Awards ==
- Major General Jack Thomas National Military Intelligence Officer of the Year (1998)
- Lifetime Achievement Award from Latina Style Inc. (2019)
- Colorado Springs Hispanic Chamber of Commerce Profiles in Valor Award (2024)

== Military awards and decorations ==
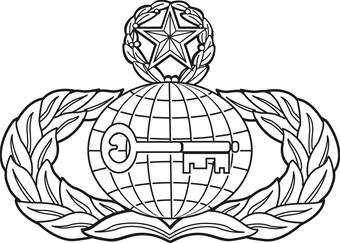

Master Intelligence Badge

Parachutist Badge

Joint Chiefs of Staff Badge

Office of the Secretary of Defense Badge

Distinguished Service Medal (Air and Space Forces) with oak leaf cluster
Defense Superior Service Medal with three oak leaf clusters
Legion of Merit with oak leaf cluster
Defense Meritorious Service Medal with three oak leaf clusters
Meritorious Service Medal with two oak leaf clusters
Joint Service Commendation Medal with oak leaf cluster
Joint Service Achievement Medal
Air and Space Achievement Medal with oak leaf cluster
Joint Meritorious Unit Award with one silver oak leaf cluster (6th award)
Meritorious Unit Award (Air and Space Forces)
Air and Space Outstanding Unit Award with one silver and three bronze oak leaf clusters (9th award)
Air and Space Organizational Excellence Award with three oak leaf clusters
National Intelligence Distinguished Service Medal
National Intelligence Superior Service Medal
National Intelligence Meritorious Unit Citation
Air and Space Recognition Ribbon
National Defense Service Medal with service star
Armed Forces Expeditionary Medal
Global War on Terrorism Expeditionary Medal
Global War on Terrorism Service Medal
Korea Defense Service Medal
Air and Space Overseas Short Tour Service Ribbon with one oak leaf cluster
Air and Space Overseas Long Tour Service Ribbon
Air and Space Expeditionary Service Ribbon with two oak leaf clusters and gold frame
Air and Space Longevity Service Award with one silver and three bronze oak leaf clusters (9th award)
Small Arms Expert Marksmanship Ribbon (Air and Space Forces)
Air and Space Training Ribbon

== Dates of Promotion ==
Second Lieutenant May 30, 1984
First Lieutenant May 30, 1986
Captain May 30, 1988
Major Nov. 1, 1994
Lieutenant Colonel June 1, 1999
Colonel May 1, 2005
Brigadier General July 16, 2010
Major General May 30, 2014

== Personal life ==
Urrutia-Varhall was married to Gregory Varhall until his death in 2011. They have three children.
