= Sandy Daniels =

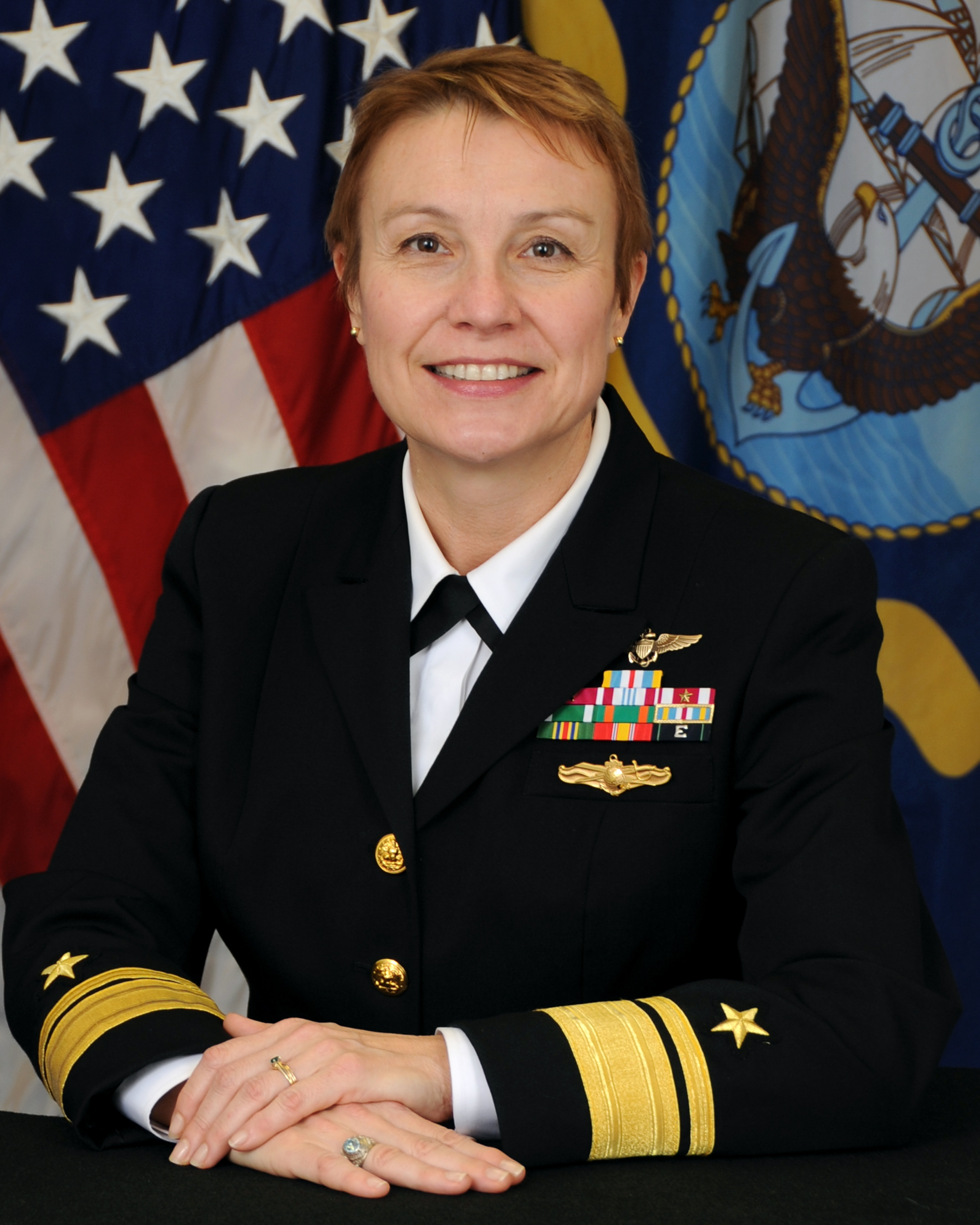
Rear Admiral Sandy Daniels

Sandy Lee Daniels (born 1958) is a retired Rear Admiral in the United States Navy. Sandy has six nieces, two nephews, five great nieces and two great nephews.

== Education ==
- United States Naval Academy
- George Washington University

== Career ==
Daniels attended Groveton High School in Fairfax County, Virginia and graduated from the Naval Academy in 1980 as a member of the first group of females admitted to USNA. In 1982, she was designated a naval aviator. Among her ensuing assignments was piloting the Lockheed P-3 Orion on oceanographic research missions.

In 1991, Daniels transferred to the United States Navy Reserve. Her assignments afterwards include serving with the National Reconnaissance Office, Naval Space Command, United States Strategic Command before joining the staff of the Chief of Naval Operations, returning to Strategic Command stationed at Vandenberg Air Force Base, serving as a space advisor to the Deputy Chief of Naval Operations and becoming Reserve Deputy Commander of the United States Pacific Fleet. On 20 February 2014, she assumed the position of Commander, Patrol and Reconnaissance Group/Commander, Patrol and Reconnaissance Group Pacific, and was expected to remain in the role until the summer of 2015.
