= Gail Reals =

American military officer

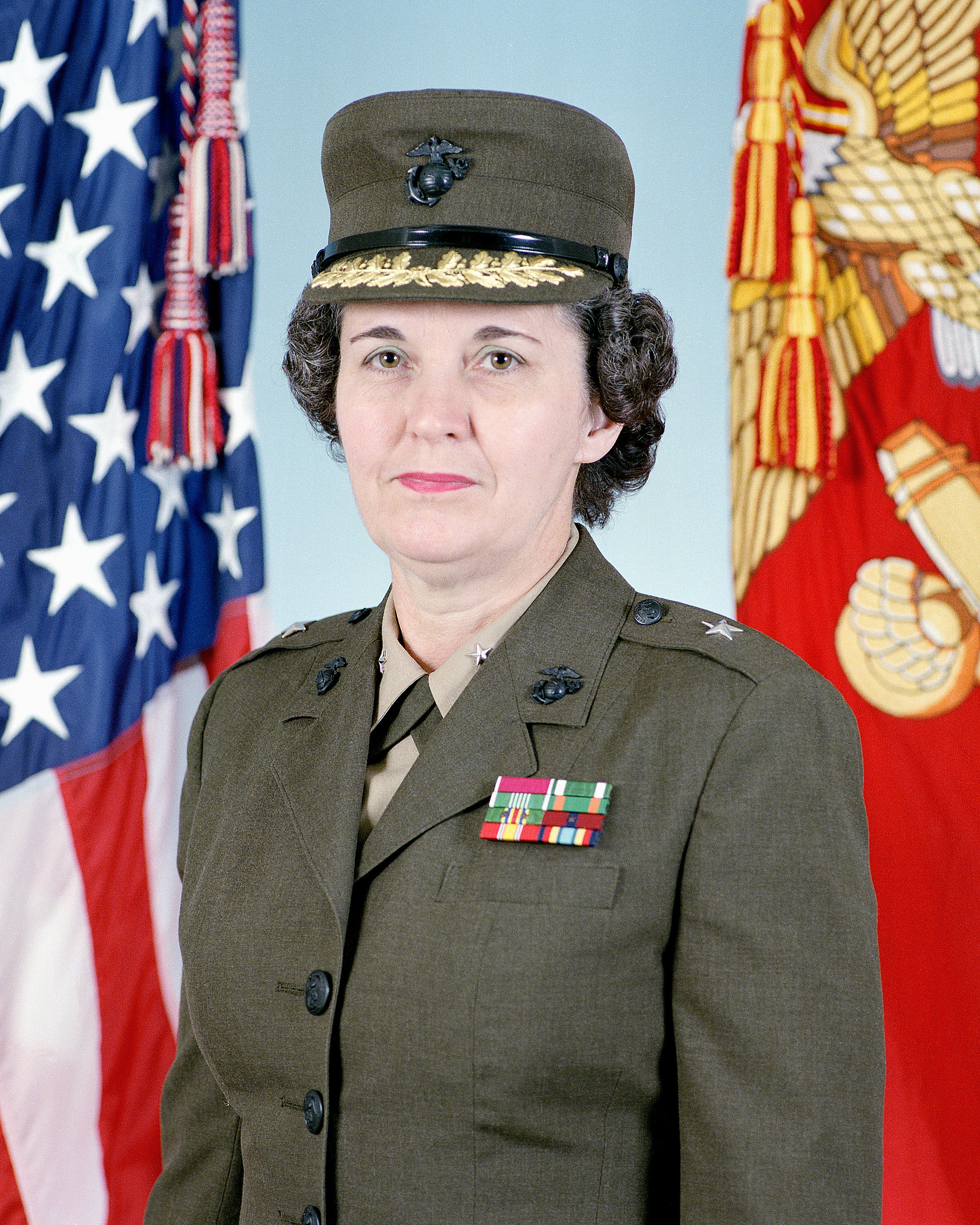
- Service / branch: United States Marine Corps
- Rank: brigadier general

Gail M. Reals (born September 1, 1935, Syracuse, New York) is an American former military officer. She was a brigadier general in the United States Marine Corps.

== Career ==
She was commissioned a second lieutenant in 1961. She was commanding officer of Woman Recruit Training Battalion. In 1985, she was commissioned brigadier general. She was commanding general of Marine Corps Base Quantico. In 1990, she retired from the Marine Corps.

== Awards and honors ==
Gail Reals was awarded the Legion of Merit. She was named a notable woman of Arlington.
