= Terry Gabreski =

US Air Force general

Terry Lee Gabreski
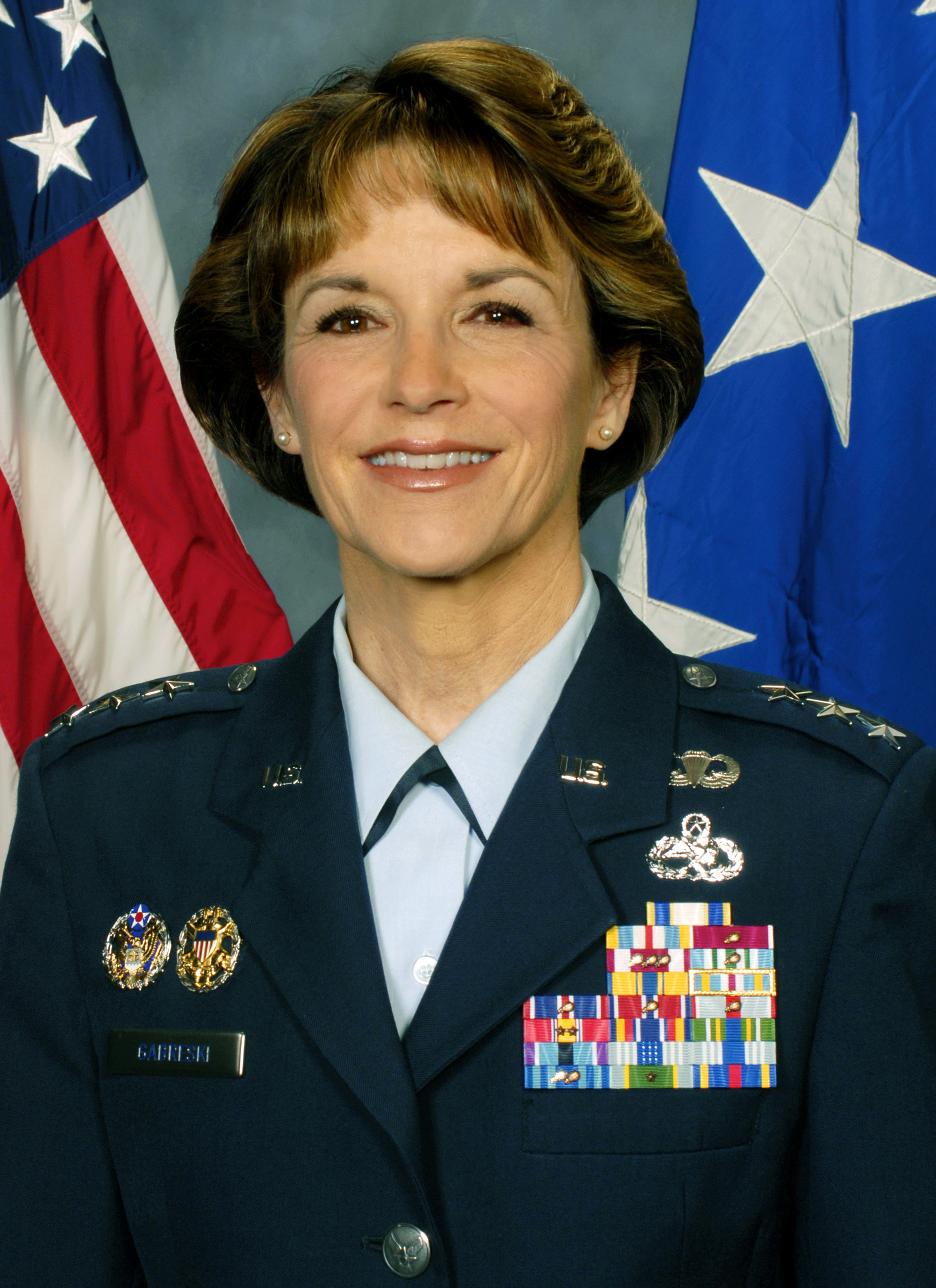
- Lieutenant General Terry L. Gabreski
- Born: Terry Lee Walter; 1952 (age 73–74)
- Spouse: Colonel Donald Gabreski
- Relatives: Gabby Gabreski (father-in-law)
- Military career
- Allegiance: United States
- Branch: United States Air Force
- Service years: 1974–2010
- Rank: Lieutenant General
- Commands: Oklahoma City Air Logistics Center
- Conflicts: Operation Allied Force
- Awards: Air Force Distinguished Service Medal (2); Defense Superior Service Medal; Legion of Merit (2)

Terry Lee Gabreski (née Walter; born 1952) is a retired senior officer of the United States Air Force (USAF). She was the second woman to hold the rank of lieutenant general in the USAF. She was the Vice Commander, Air Force Materiel Command, Wright-Patterson Air Force Base, Ohio, which conducts research, development, test and evaluation, and provides acquisition management and logistics support necessary to keep Air Force weapon systems ready for war. She is the daughter of retired Air Force Brigadier General Alonzo Walter and the daughter-in-law of World War II and Korean War fighter ace Colonel Gabby Gabreski.

== Education and personal life ==
Gabreski was born Terry Lee Walter in 1952, the daughter of United States Air Force (USAF) Brigadier General Alonzo J. Walter, Jr. (1928–2022), then a test pilot, and Doris Walter, who had also been a commissioned officer. After completing her Bachelor of Arts degree in history at Louisiana State University, where she was a member of Delta Delta Delta, Gabreski joined the USAF, attended Air Force Officer Training School, and was commissioned a second lieutenant on 10 September 1974. She later received a Master of Public Administration degree from Golden Gate University in 1978. Gabreski also attended the Executive Program for Senior Officials in National Security which was conducted in 1994 by the John F. Kennedy School of Government, Harvard University, Cambridge, Massachusetts and the General Manager Program, Harvard Business School, Cambridge, Massachusetts in 2002.

In 1983 she was selected as the USAF Aircraft Maintenance Company Grade Officer of the Year and was awarded the Eugene M. Zuckert Management Award in 1999 as recognition for her top-level Air Force management skills.

In 1989 she married Colonel Donald Francis Gabreski (born 1949), a retired USAF pilot, eldest son of World War II and Korean War ace, Colonel Francis S. "Gabby" Gabreski, and they had two sons, born in 1992 and 1995. On her retirement Gabreski noted that she applied three times for pilot training but had been turned down each time because, being only five feet tall, she could not meet minimum height requirements for the T-38 Talon trainer.

== Assignments ==
Prior to her final assignment, Gabreski served as commander of the Oklahoma City Air Logistics Center at Tinker Air Force Base from December 2003 to August 2005, which was the first Air Force installation to implement National Security Personnel System. She also served as Director of Logistics, Headquarters Air Force Materiel Command from August 2001 to December 2003, and as Director of Maintenance for the Deputy Chief of Staff for Installations and Logistics at Headquarters United States Air Force from January 2000 to August 2001.

Other than these assignments she directed two aircraft maintenance units, served as a squadron maintenance supervisor in three units, commanded three maintenance squadrons and a logistics group and served at the Air Staff, Secretary of the Air Force and Joint Staff levels.

Gabreski also served as one of the original female Air Training Officers charged with mentoring the first female cadets of the U.S. Air Force Academy. Then-Lt. Gabreski served in this role from January 1976 to September 1977 for the Class of 1980 female cadets.

During Operation Allied Force in the 1999 air war against Yugoslavia, Gabreski directed logistics efforts as the A-4 for the air war across the entire theater. She holds a master aircraft maintenance badge and a basic parachute rating.

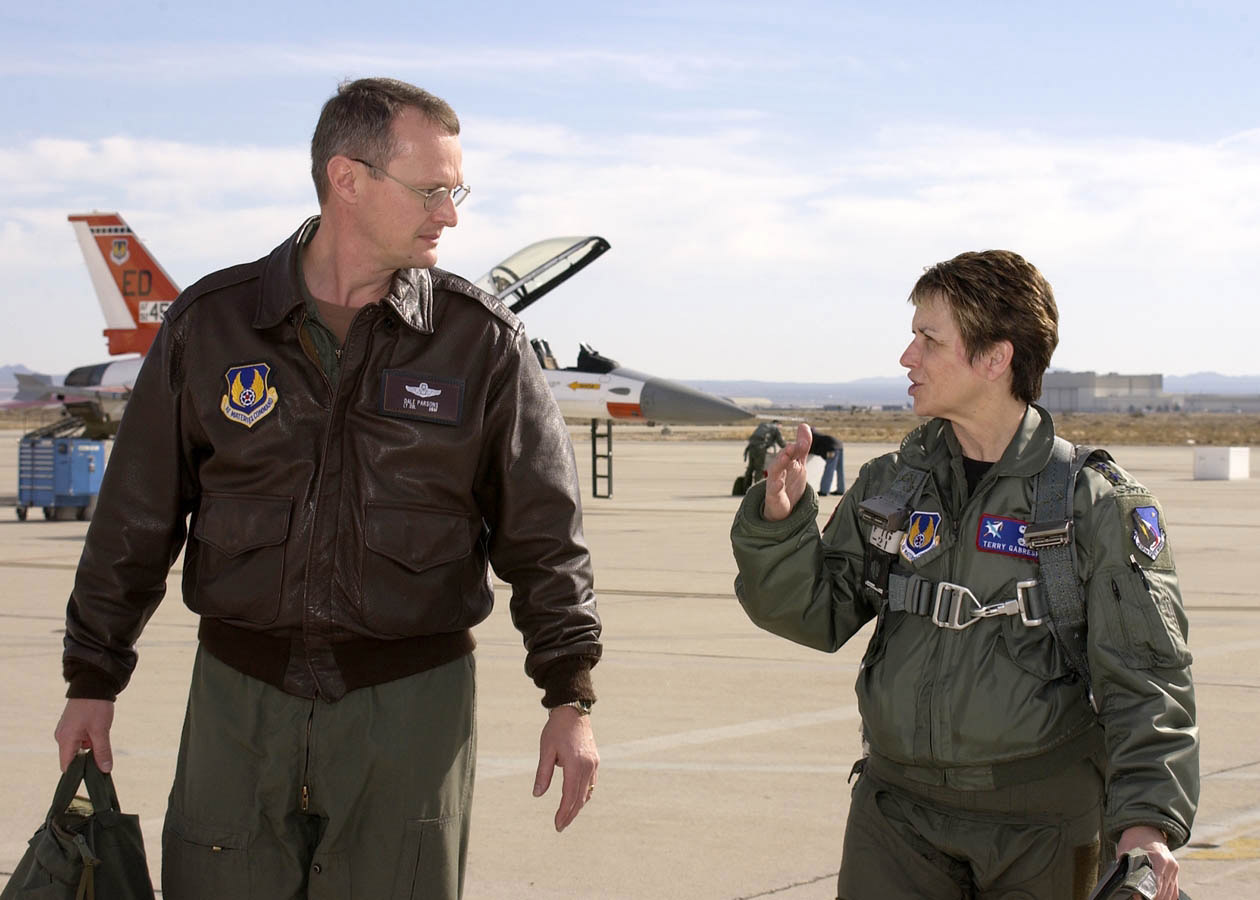
Lieutenant General Gabreski (right) and Lieutenant Colonel Dale Parsons, U.S. Air Force Test Pilot School director of special courses, discuss Gabreski's F-16 flight.

== Awards and decorations ==
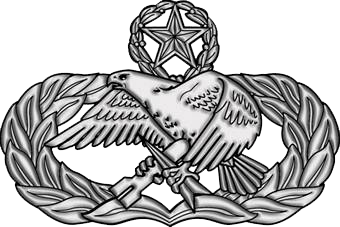
Basic Parachutist Badge
Master Maintenance Badge
Headquarters Air Force Badge
Joint Chiefs of Staff Badge

Air Force Distinguished Service Medal with bronze oak leaf cluster
Defense Superior Service Medal
Legion of Merit with bronze oak leaf cluster
Meritorious Service Medal with silver and two bronze oak leaf clusters
Joint Service Commendation Medal with bronze oak leaf cluster
Air Force Commendation Medal
Joint Meritorious Unit Award
Air Force Outstanding Unit Award with bronze oak leaf cluster
Air Force Organizational Excellence Award with bronze oak leaf cluster
Air Force Recognition Ribbon with bronze oak leaf cluster
National Defense Service Medal with two bronze service stars
Global War on Terrorism Service Medal
Korea Defense Service Medal
Humanitarian Service Medal
Air Force Overseas Short Tour Service Ribbon
Air Force Overseas Long Tour Service Ribbon
Air Force Longevity Service Award with one silver and two bronze oak leaf clusters
Small Arms Expert Marksmanship Ribbon with bronze service star
Air Force Training Ribbon

== Effective dates of promotion ==
Promotions
Insignia	Rank	Date
	Lieutenant General	August 1, 2005
	Major General	December 1, 2002
	Brigadier General	March 1, 1999
	Colonel	December 1, 1992
	Lieutenant Colonel	July 1, 1988
	Major	August 1, 1984
	Captain	September 10, 1978
	First Lieutenant	September 10, 1976
	Second Lieutenant	September 10, 1974

== See also ==
- Military of the United States
- List of female United States military generals and flag officers
