= Sandra Best =

Minnesota Air National Guard officer (born 1964)

Sandra L. Best
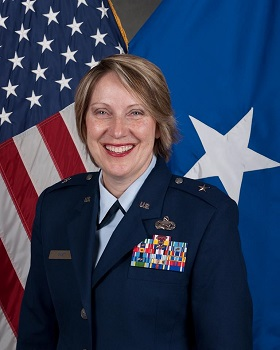
- Best c. 2017

Chief of Staff to the Governor of Minnesota
- In office March 2021 – September 2022
- Governor: Tim Walz

Interim Adjutant General of Minnesota
- In office August 3, 2020 – August 20, 2020
- Preceded by: Jon A. Jensen
- Succeeded by: Shawn P. Manke

Personal details
- Born: 1964 (age 61–62) Minneapolis, Minnesota, U.S.
- Education: Metropolitan State University (BA); University of St. Thomas (MBA)
- Nickname: Sandy

Military service
- Allegiance: United States; Minnesota
- Branch/service: Minnesota Air National Guard
- Years of service: 1984–2022
- Rank: Brigadier General
- Unit: 133rd Airlift Wing
- Commands: 133rd Airlift Wing
- Battles/wars: Global War on Terror; War in Afghanistan; Operation Enduring Freedom

Sandra "Sandy" L. Best (born 1964) is a retired Minnesota Air National Guard officer who served as the Chief of Staff of the Minnesota Air National Guard, the Chief of Staff to the Governor of Minnesota, the interim Adjutant General of Minnesota, and the Deputy Adjutant General for the Minnesota National Guard. Best is the first woman in the history the Minnesota National Guard to hold the rank of Brigadier General.

== Early life and education ==
Best was born in 1964 in Minneapolis, Minnesota and grew up in Hudson, Wisconsin. Best's father served in the United States Marine Corps while both of her grandfathers served in the United States Army.

Best received a Bachelor of Arts degree in human resource management from Metropolitan State University in 1988 and a Master of Business Administration from the University of St. Thomas in 2000.

== Military career ==
=== Enlisted career ===
At 20 years-old, Best enlisted in the Minnesota Air National Guard in 1984 where she served in the 133rd Airlift Wing. Best rose through the enlisted ranks to the rank of Technical Sergeant before attending officer training at the Academy of Military Science at McGhee Tyson Air National Guard Base. Best was commissioned on February 14, 1991, with the rank of Second Lieutenant.

=== Officer career ===
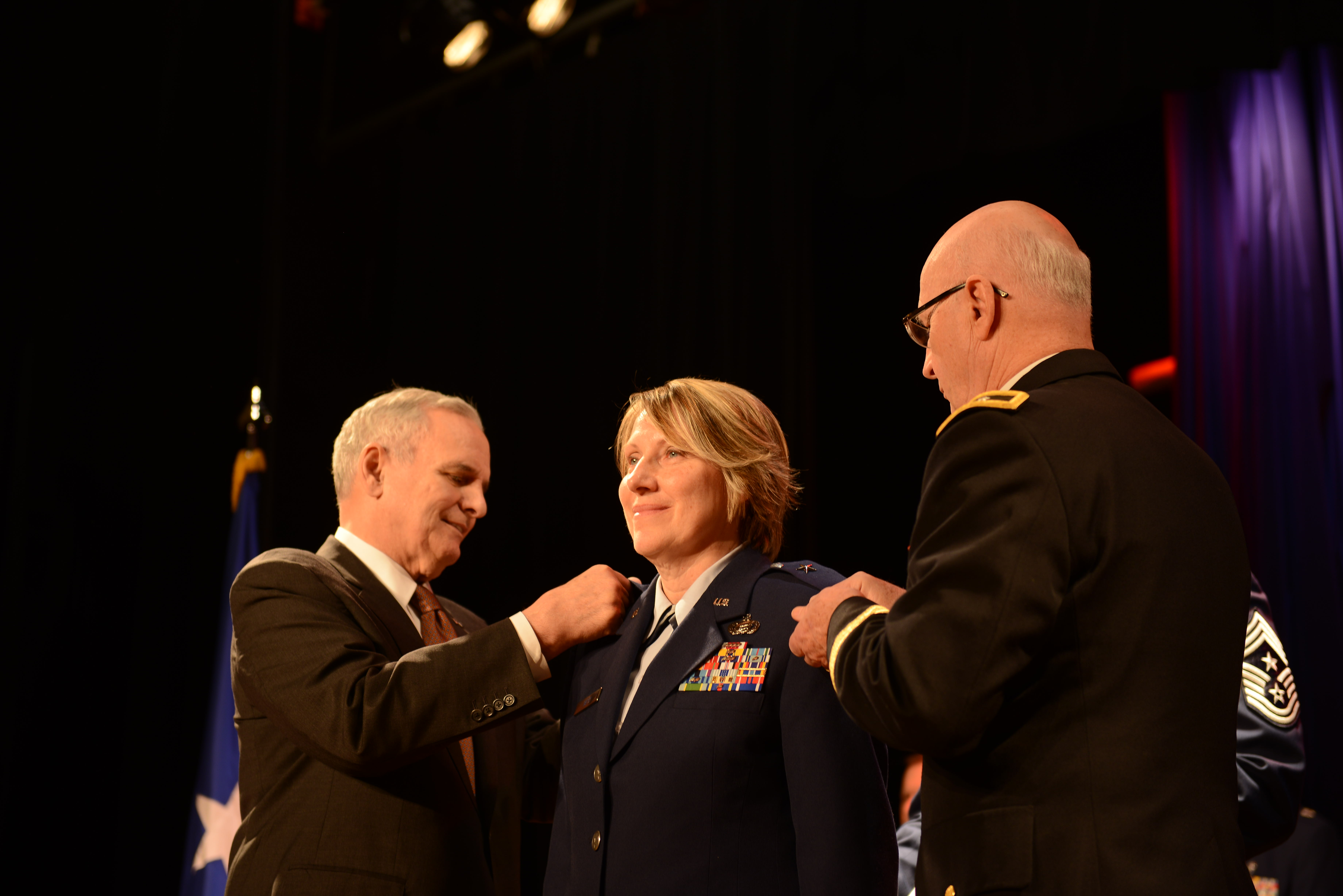
Best (center) during her promotion ceremony to Brigadier General. Best's ranks were pinned by Minnesota Governor Mark Dayton(left) and Minnesota Adjutant General Richard C. Nash (right)

Best continued to serve with the 133rd as a Personnel Officer and was eventually promoted to the rank of First Lieutenant on February 20, 1993. Best was promoted to the rank of Captain on February 27, 1995, and Major on March 20, 1999. From May 2001 to December 2002 Best served as the Executive Support Officer of the 133rd Airlift Wing. From December 2002 to January 2005 Best served as the Military Personnel Management Officer for the Joint Force Headquarters of the Minnesota National Guard, during this time Best was promoted to the rank of Lieutenant Colonel on May 18, 2003. From January 2005 to February 2006, Best was assigned as the Lead Operational Readiness Inspection Planner for the 133rd Airlift Wing, Best was later assigned as the Operations Officer of the 133rd Logistics Readiness Squadron from February 2006 to March 2008. Best later commanded the 133rd Logistics Readiness Squadron from March 2008 to March 2011, during this time Best also served as the Force Rotations Chief of Combined Joint Task Force 101 at Bagram Airfield in Afghanistan from September 2008 to March 2009. Following her deployment to Afghanistan Best served as the Director of Government Relations from March 2011 to August 2014, during this time Best was promoted to the rank of Colonel on May 24, 2012. Best later commanded the 133rd Mission Support Group and served as the Director of Strategic Relations from September 2014 to February 2016.

Best was promoted to the rank of Brigadier General on February 1, 2016. Following her appointment to Brigadier General Best was assigned as the chief of staff of the Minnesota Air National Guard from February 2016 to August 2019. As the chief of staff Best oversaw both the 133rd Airlift Wing and the 148th Fighter Wing. From April 2019 to March 2021 Best was also assigned as the Special Assistant to the Chief of the National Guard Bureau for Diversity, Equity, and Inclusion for the National Guard Bureau. Best served as the interim Adjutant General of Minnesota following the appointment of Shawn P. Manke and the retirement of Jon A. Jensen. From March 2021 to September 2022 Best served as the Chief of staff to the governor of Minnesota Tim Walz. Best retired from the Minnesota Air National Guard on September 2, 2022.
