= Frances Shea-Buckley =

- Born: February 26, 1929; Massachusetts
- Died: July 8, 2015 (aged 86); San Diego, California
- Burial place: Arlington National Cemetery
- Military career
- Allegiance: United States
- Branch: United States Navy
- Service years: 1951–1954; 1960–1983
- Rank: Rear Admiral
- Commands: United States Navy Nurse Corps; Naval Health Sciences Education and Training Command
- Conflicts: Vietnam War
- Awards: Legion of Merit; Meritorious Service Medal; Navy and Marine Corps Commendation Medal

Frances Teresa Shea-Buckley (February 26, 1929 – July 8, 2015) was a United States rear admiral who served as Director of the United States Navy Nurse Corps from 1979 to 1983.

== Early life ==
Frances Teresa Shea was born on February 26, 1929, in Massachusetts. She earned a Bachelor of Science degree from St. Joseph College in Hartford, Connecticut, in 1950.

== Navy Nurse Corps career ==
Shea joined the Navy Nurse Corps in 1951 and stayed in the Reserves when she left active duty in 1954. She earned a Master of Science degree in nursing service administration from DePaul University in Chicago, Illinois, in 1960, and returned to active duty. Billets of increasing responsibility included a stint as operating room supervisor in hospital ship USS Repose off Vietnam in 1968. Shea became director of the Navy Nurse Corps in 1979, and became the first director to add additional concurrent billets to that duty, including commanding officer of Naval Health Sciences Education and Training Command, and deputy commander for Personnel Management, Naval Medical Command.

Military offices
Preceded by Maxine Conder	Director, Navy Nurse Corps; 1979–1983	Succeeded by Mary Joan Nielubowicz
