= Margaret A. Rykowski =

United States admiral

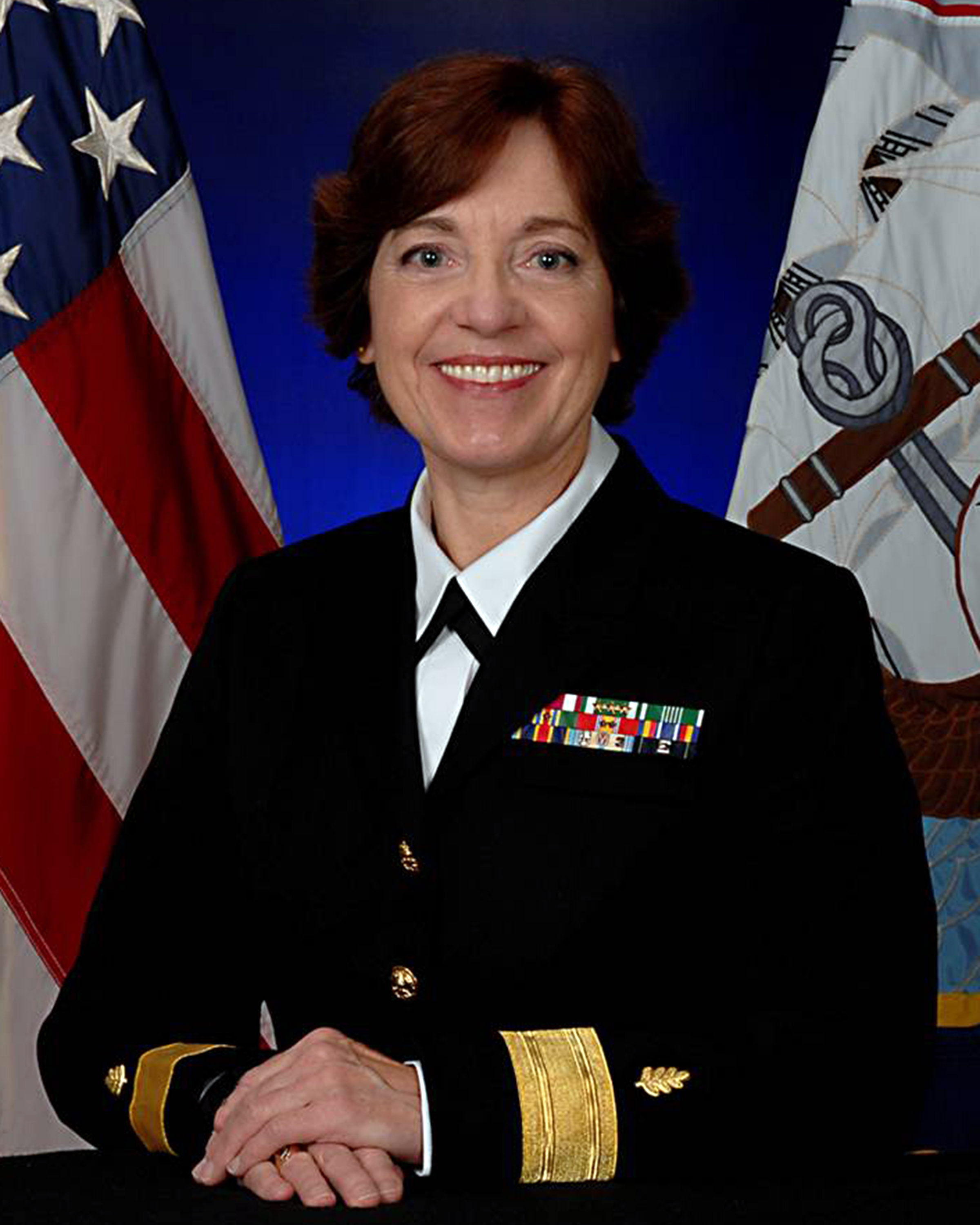
- Rear Admiral Margaret A. Rykowski
- Military career
- Allegiance: United States
- Branch: United States Navy
- Service years: 1987–present
- Rank: Rear Admiral
- Nickname: Kate
- Awards: Meritorious Service Medal; Navy and Marine Corps Commendation Medal (4); Army Commendation Medal

Margaret A. Rykowski is a rear admiral in the United States Navy Reserve and serves as Deputy Fleet Surgeon, United States Fleet Forces Command and deputy director, United States Navy Nurse Corps, Reserve Component.

== Early life ==
A native of Milwaukee, Wisconsin, Rykowski is a graduate of the University of Wisconsin–Milwaukee. As a civilian, she works as a nursing director at San Francisco General Hospital.

== Military career ==
Rykowski joined the United States Navy Reserve in 1987. She was called to active duty for the Gulf War and was assigned to Naval Hospital Oakland. Later, she transferred to Naval Hospital Oakland following her release from active duty.

In 2003, Rykowski was recalled to active duty for the War in Afghanistan and was stationed in Bremerton, Washington. She was later mobilized to the Landstuhl Regional Medical Center in Germany. After her return, she was assigned to the United States Third Fleet.

Awards Rykowski has received include the Meritorious Service Medal, the Navy and Marine Corps Commendation Medal with three award stars and the Army Commendation Medal.
