= Maureen G. Banavige =

US Air Force officer (born c. 1969)

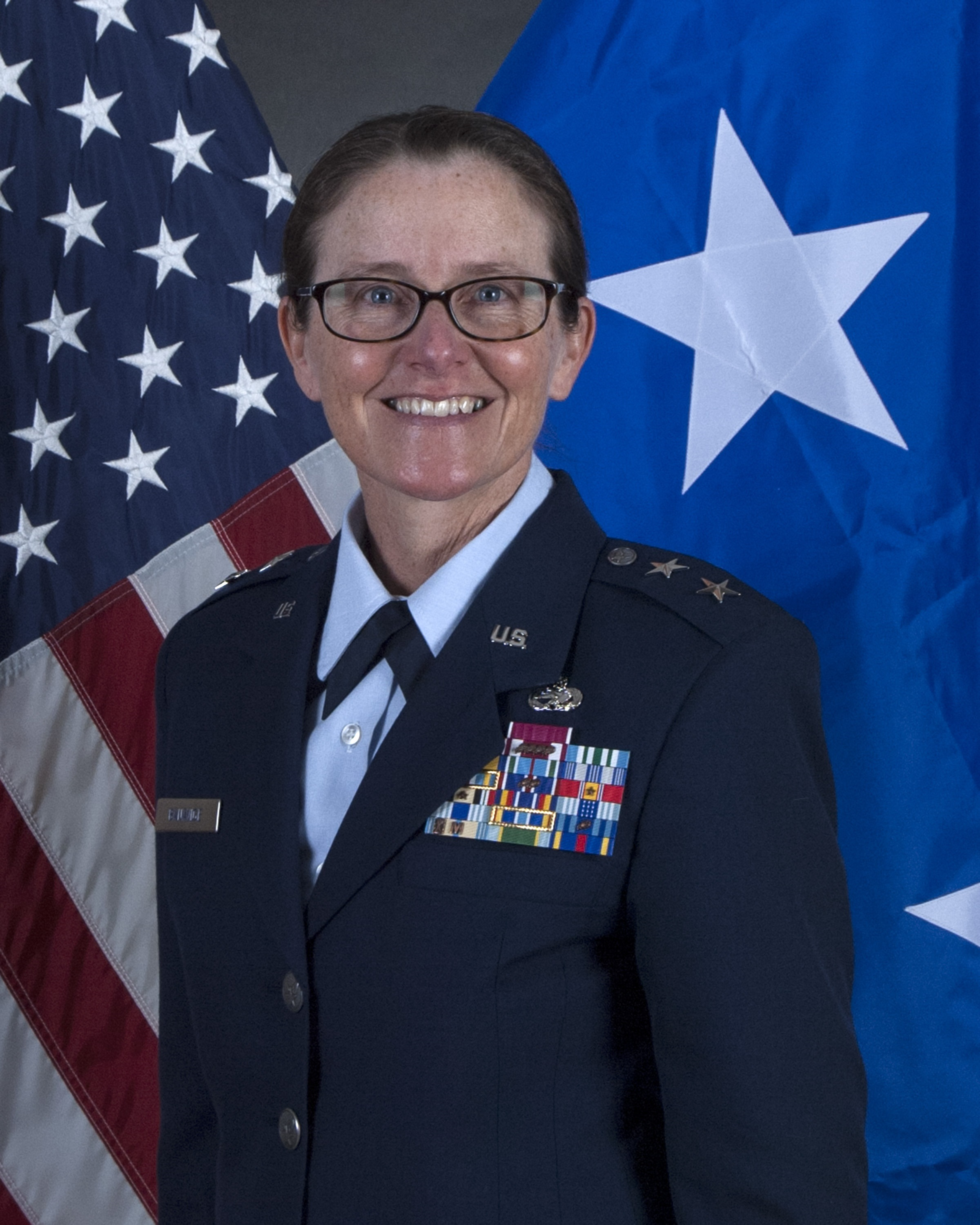
- Major General Maureen G. Banavige, USAF, c. 2018
- Born: c. 1969 (age 56–57)
- Alma mater: Worcester Polytechnic Institute (BS); Boston University (MBA); National Defense University (MS)
- Military career
- Allegiance: United States
- Branch: United States Air Force
- Service years: 1991–1996 (active); 1996–2024 (reserve)
- Rank: Major General
- Commands: 459th Maintenance Group; 934th Maintenance Squadron; 934th Logistics Readiness Squadron
- Awards: Legion of Merit; Bronze Star Medal; Meritorious Service Medal (5); Air Force Commendation Medal (2); Joint Service Achievement Medal; Air Force Achievement Medal

Maureen G. Banavige (born c. 1969) is a retired United States Air Force officer who served as the mobilization assistant to the Commander, Air Force Reserve Command from August 2022 to May 2024. She served as the mobilization assistant to the Commander, Air Force Materiel Command from February 2019 to August 2022. Before this assignment, she served as the mobilization assistant to the Commander, Air Force Sustainment Center from August 2018 to February 2019.

Banavige was commissioned in 1991 through the Air Force ROTC program at Worcester Polytechnic Institute, Massachusetts. She served on active duty in various logistics roles at the field and program office levels before she joined the Air Force Reserve in 1996. She is a career logistics and maintenance officer who has commanded twice at the squadron level and once at the group level.

== Education ==
In 1991, Banavige earned a Bachelor of Science in Applied Mathematics from the Worcester Polytechnic Institute in Worcester Massachusetts. She attended a Transportation Officers Course at the Sheppard Air Force Base in Texas in 1992. In 1994, she earned her Master of Business Administration from Boston University and attended a Logistics Plans Officers Course at the Lackland Air Force Base in Texas.

She continued her education through correspondence with various schools like the Squadron Officer School in 1999, the Air Command and Staff College in 2004 and the Air war College in 2007.

In 2004 she attended the Aircraft Maintenance Course at the Sheppard Air Force Base in Texas.

Banavige then attended the Industrial College of the Armed Forces at Fort Lesley J. McNair in Washington in 2008 and received her Masters of Science in National Resource Strategy from the National Defense University that same year.

In 2016, she attended the University of North Carolina and completed the LOGTECH Program for Executives in Logistics and Technology. In 2017, Banavige attended the CAPSTONE program at Fort Lesley J. McNair.

== Military assignments ==
From August 1992 until January 1994, Banavige was a Transportation Officer for the 36th Transportation Squadron located at the Bitburg Air Base in Germany. She then went to Hanscom Air Force Base in Mass where she took on the role as integrated logistics support manager for Navy Programs at the Joint Tactical Information, Distribution System, Joint Program Office until July 1994, after which she was chief of software maintenance until June 1995. Before leaving Active Duty and joining the Air Force Reserves in August 1996, she was the Chief of Resource Management.

As a reservist, Bavanige was stationed at the Minneapolis-St. Paul International Airport Air Reserve Station with the 934th Logistics Readiness Squadron, where she was a transportation officer from August 1996 until April 1999, then Commander until December 2000. From December 2000 until 2003 she assumed the position of Deputy Commander before returning to the position of Commander until June 2007.

Banavige did a tour in Baghdad from December 2005 until June 2006 as a Program Manager for the Iraqi Air Force Mobility Programs (C-130 and helicopter platforms) /Coalition Air Force Transition Team, part of the Multi-National+Security+Transition+Command+–+Iraq.

In August 2007 until June 2008, she was a student at the Industrial College of the Armed Forces, Fort Lesley J. McNair, in Washington, D.C. She then became the individual mobilization assistant to the Chief, Logistics Operations Division, Directorate of Logistics, Headquarters Air Mobility Command located at the Scott Air Force Base in Illinois from August 2008 until February 2011.

She then took on the role as Commander of the 459th Maintenance Group at the Joint Base Andrews in Maryland until December 2012.

From January 2013 until April 2015, Banavige was the mobilization assistant to the Commander at the Oklahoma City Air Logistics Complex located at the Tinker Air Force Base in Oklahoma. She then moved to the Air Combat Command Joint Base Langley-Eustis in Virginia to be the mobilization assistant to the director of Logistics, Engineering and Force Protection until October 2017.

From October 2017 until August 2018, she was the mobilization assistant to the Commander, Air Force Life Cycle Management Center at the Wright-Patterson Air Force Base in Ohio. She then returned to the Air Force Sustainment Center on the Tinker Air Force Base until February 2019.Banavige then returned to Air Force Materiel Command at Wright-Patterson Air Force Base as mobilization to the Commander until August 2022.

From August 2022 until her retirement on 1 May 2024, Banavige was the mobilization assistant to the Commander at the Air Force Reserve Command (AFRC) located at Robins Air Force Base in Georgia.

As mobilization assistant, Banavige was part of the General Officer Inspire and Air Force Reserve 75th Anniversary events in July 2023. She was also the Reserve Component mentor for the Fortify the Force Initiative Team (FFIT) in 2023.

Maureen G. Banavige joined the Department of Defense’s Reserve Forces Policy Board in August 2024, and her term is recorded as ending in April 2025 (designation: Special Government Employee).

On Veteran's Day 2025, Banavige was part of the Bravo Zulu House in Winnebago with Retired Lieutenant Colonel Sam Andrews.

== Effective dates of promotion ==
- Second lieutenant (May 18, 1991)
- First lieutenant (November 25, 1993)
- Captain (November 25, 1995)
- Major (June 2, 2000)
- Lieutenant colonel (September 30, 2004)
- Colonel (August 15, 2008)
- Brigadier general (March 26, 2015)
- Major general (December 12, 2018)
