= Joyce L. Stevens =

Joyce J. Stevens
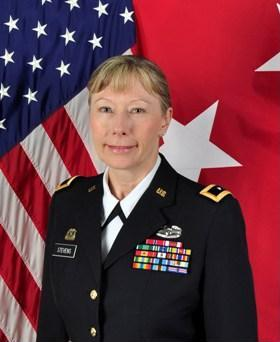
- Joyce L. Stevens
- Military career
- Allegiance: United States
- Branch: United States Army
- Service years: 1979–2013
- Rank: Major General
- Commands: Texas Army National Guard; 111th Area Support Group; 536th Forward Support Battalion
- Conflicts: War in Afghanistan
- Awards: Bronze Star Medal

Major General Joyce "Joy" Stevens is a retired senior officer in the United States Army National Guard and the first female general officer in the Texas Army National Guard. She was promoted to brigadier general on 14 July 2006 and to major general on 5 August 2010. She served as assistant to the Adjutant General of the Texas Military Forces and dually titled as the Commander of the Texas Army National Guard, commanding approximately 19,000 soldiers and 117 armories in 102 communities across Texas.

== Military career ==
Stevens began her military career in April 1979. Her assignments have included various command and staff positions within the 49th Armored Division and the 71st Troop Command. She served as the commander of the 536th Forward Support Battalion where she was also the full-time Battalion Administrative Officer; the Assistant Chief of Staff, G4 for the 49th Armored Division (Rear); the 71st Troop Command Assistant Chief of Staff, G3; and the commander of the 111th Area Support Group. She deployed to combat as a brigade-level task force commander in support of Operation Enduring Freedom in Afghanistan. Her unit was responsible for base operations, which entailed the management and security of Bagram Air Field (the largest United States Base in Afghanistan). Additionally, Stevens was responsible for security and reconstruction projects in the adjacent Kapisa, Parwan and Panjshir Provinces of Afghanistan.

== Awards and decorations ==
Bronze Star Medal
Meritorious Service Medal (with 3 Bronze Oak Leaf Clusters)
Army Commendation Medal
Army Achievement Medal (with 1 Bronze Oak Leaf Cluster)
Army Reserve Component Achievement Medal (with Silver Oak Leaf Cluster)
National Defense Service Medal (with Bronze Service Star)
Afghanistan Campaign Medal
Global War on Terrorism Service Medal
Armed Forces Service Medal
Humanitarian Service Medal
Armed Forces Reserve Medal (with Silver Hourglass Device and M Device)
Army Service Ribbon
Overseas Service Ribbon
Army Reserve Components Overseas Training Ribbon (with Numeral 2)
Combat Action Badge

== Promotions ==
- Second Lieutenant 27 June 1981
- First Lieutenant 26 June 1984
- Captain 4 March 1987
- Major 23 January 1993
- Lieutenant Colonel 15 April 1998
- Colonel 31 July 2002
- Brigadier General 14 July 2006
- Major General 5 August 2010
