= Mary Joan Nielubowicz =

American naval officer and nurse

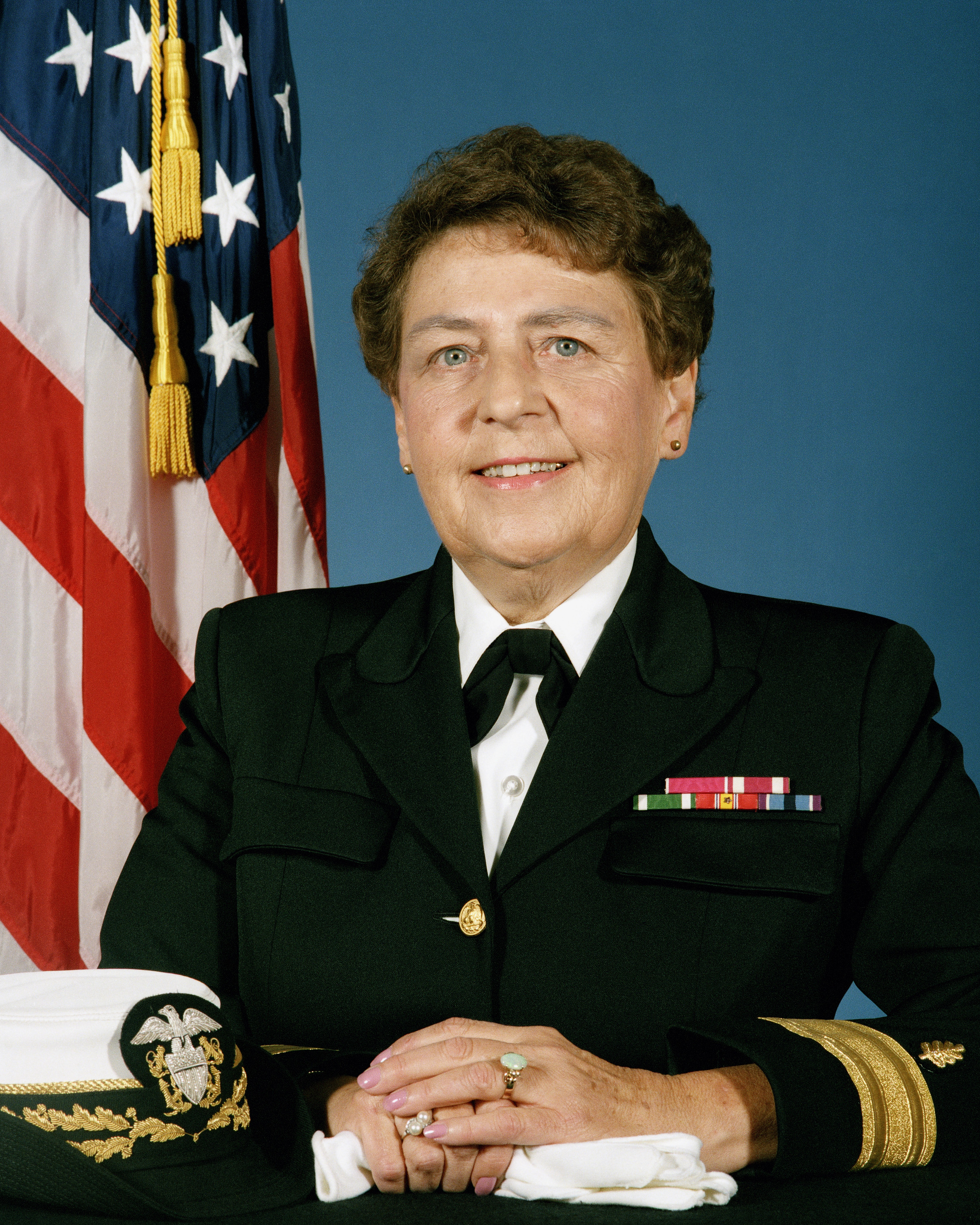
- Rear Adm. Nielubowicz in 1987
- Born: 5 February 1929; Shenandoah, Pennsylvania
- Died: 24 March 2008 (aged 79) Fairfax, Virginia
- Allegiance: United States
- Branch: United States Navy
- Service years: 1951–1987
- Rank: Rear Admiral
- Commands: Director of the United States Navy Nurse Corps
- Awards: Legion of Merit with gold star device; Meritorious Service Medal; Navy Commendation Medal; National Defense Service Medal with bronze star; Humanitarian Service Medal
- Other work: Chairman of the Veterans Administration's Committee for Women Veterans, board of directors of the Women in Military Service for America Memorial Foundation, board of directors of Vinson Hall Corporation

Retired Rear Admiral Mary Joan Nielubowicz was the Director of the Navy Nurse Corps from 1983 to 1987.

== Early life ==
Mary Joan Nielubowicz was born on 5 February 1929 in Shenandoah, Pennsylvania to Joseph and Ursula Nielubowicz and graduated from Shenandoah Catholic High School. She earned a nursing diploma from Misericordia Hospital, Philadelphia, in 1950.

== Navy Nurse Corps career ==
Nielubowicz joined the Navy Nurse Corps in 1951. While in the Nurse Corps, she earned a Bachelor of Science degree from the University of Colorado Boulder in 1961 and a Master of Science degree in nursing from the University of Pennsylvania in 1965.

She served in areas around the globe, including Portsmouth, Virginia, Corona, California, Guantanamo Bay, Cuba, Annapolis, Maryland, Philadelphia, Washington, D.C., Iwakuni, Japan, Marine Corps Air Station Cherry Point, North Carolina, Guam and Long Beach, California.

Billets of increasing responsibility included that of senior nurse at the branch clinic in Iwakuni, Japan]in 1967. In 1979 she became director of nursing services at the Naval Regional Medical Center, Portsmouth, Virginia.

She became director of the Navy Nurse Corps in 1983, and was promoted to the rank of Commodore (equivalent to today's Rear Admiral (lower half). In 1985 the rank was changed to Rear Admiral.). She served concurrently as deputy commander for Personnel Management and later as deputy commander for Health Care Operations.

In 1986, Navy Nurse Corps members of the Association of Military Surgeons of the United States (AMSUS) established the Mary J. Nielubowicz Essay Award in recognition of her outstanding support and encouragement of active and reserve nurses.

Admiral Nielubowicz died at her home in Fairfax, Virginia on 24 March 2008. She was interred at Arlington National Cemetery on 21 May 2008.

== See also ==
- Navy Nurse Corps
- Women in the United States Navy

Preceded by Frances Shea-Buckley	Director, Navy Nurse Corps; 1983–1987	Succeeded by Mary Fields Hall
