= List of United States military schools and academies =

Most military schools in the United States are educational institutions that place a high emphasis on military preparation, academic rigor, and physical fitness. Most military schools are private and have high tuition, with financial aid available.

== Service academies ==
- United States Military Academy (West Point, New York)
- United States Naval Academy (Annapolis, Maryland)
- United States Air Force Academy (Colorado Springs, Colorado)
- United States Coast Guard Academy (New London, Connecticut)
- United States Merchant Marine Academy (Kings Point, New York)

== Senior colleges ==
- Norwich University (Northfield, Vermont; four-year private university)
- The Citadel (Charleston, South Carolina; four-year public college)
- Texas A&M University (College Station, Texas; four-year public university)
- University of North Georgia (Dahlonega, Georgia; four-year public university)
- Virginia Military Institute (Lexington, Virginia; four-year public college)
- Virginia Tech (Blacksburg, Virginia; four-year public university)

== State-supported, maritime colleges ==
Students at these academies are organized as cadets, and graduate with appropriate licenses from the U.S. Coast Guard and/or the U.S. Merchant Marine. While not immediately offered a commission as an officer within a service, cadets do have the opportunity to participate in commissioning programs like the Strategic Sealift Officer Program (Navy) and Maritime Academy Graduate (Coast Guard).

- Cal Poly Maritime Academy (Vallejo, California; part of the California State University system)
- Great Lakes Maritime Academy (Traverse City, Michigan; a division of Northwestern Michigan College)
- Maine Maritime Academy (Castine, Maine)
- Massachusetts Maritime Academy (Buzzards Bay, Massachusetts)
- State University of New York Maritime College (Bronx, New York City, New York; part of the State University of New York system)
- Texas A&M Maritime Academy (Galveston, Texas; part of Galveston campus of the Texas A&M University System)

== Service graduate schools ==
=== Joint ===
- National Defense University (NDU) (Washington, D.C.)
  - College of Information and Cyberspace (CIC) (Washington, D.C.)
  - College of International Security Affairs (CISA) (Washington, D.C.)
  - Dwight D. Eisenhower School for National Security and Resource Strategy (ES) (Washington, D.C.)
  - Joint Forces Staff College (JFSC) (Norfolk, Virginia)
  - National War College (NWC) (Washington, D.C.)
- National Intelligence University (Bethesda, Maryland)
  - College of Strategic Intelligence (CSI)
  - Anthony G. Oettinger School of Science and Technology Intelligence (SSTI)
- The Judge Advocate General's Legal Center and School (TJAGLCS) (Charlottesville, Virginia)
- Uniformed Services University of the Health Sciences (USU) (Bethesda, Maryland)
  - F. Edward Hebert School of Medicine (MEDSCHOOL)
  - Daniel K. Inouye Graduate School of Nursing (GSN)
  - Postgraduate Dental College
  - College of Allied Health Sciences (CAHS)
- Joint Special Operations University (JSOU) (Tampa, Florida)

=== Army ===
- Army University (Fort Leavenworth, Kansas)
  - Army Command and General Staff College (CGSC) (Fort Leavenworth, Kansas)
    - Command and General Staff School (CGSS)
    - School of Advanced Military Studies (SAMS)
    - School for Command Preparation (SCP)
    - School of Advanced Leadership and Tactics (SALT)
  - Army Warrant Officer Career College (WOCC) (Fort Novosel, Alabama)
  - Army Management Staff College (AMSC) (Fort Leavenworth, Kansas)
  - Western Hemisphere Institute for Security Cooperation (WHINSEC) (Fort Leavenworth, Kansas)
- United States Army War College (USAWC) (Carlisle, Pennsylvania)

=== Marine Corps ===
- Marine Corps University (MCU) (Quantico, Virginia)
  - Marine Corps Command and Staff College (CSC)
  - School of Advanced Warfighting (SAW)
  - Marine Corps War College (MCWAR)

=== Navy ===
- Naval War College (USNWC) (Newport, Rhode Island)
  - College of Naval Command and Staff (CNCS)
  - Naval Staff College (NSC)
  - Maritime Advanced Warfighting School (MAWS)
  - College of Naval Warfare (CNW)
  - Naval Command College (NCC)
  - College of Distance Education (CDE)
  - College of Leadership and Ethics (CLE)
  - College of Maritime Operational Warfare (CMOW)
- Naval Postgraduate School (NPS) (Monterey, California)

=== Air Force ===
- Air University (AU) (Montgomery, Alabama)
  - Air Command and Staff College (ACSC)
  - School of Advanced Air and Space Studies (SAASS)
  - Air War College (AWC)
  - Air Force Institute of Technology (AFIT) (Dayton, Ohio)

=== Space Force ===
- Johns Hopkins University School of Advanced International Studies (SAIS) (Washington, D.C.)
  - U.S. Space Force Schriever Space Scholars Program (ILE)
  - U.S. Space Force Strategic Thinkers Program (STP)
  - U.S. Space Force West Space Scholars Program (SLE)

== Junior colleges ==
Four institutions are considered military junior colleges. These four schools participate in the Army's two-year Early Commissioning Program (ECP), an Army ROTC program in which qualified students can earn a commission as a Second Lieutenant after only two years of college. The four Military Junior Colleges are:

- Georgia Military College (Milledgeville, Georgia)
- Marion Military Institute (Marion, Alabama)
- New Mexico Military Institute (Roswell, New Mexico)
- Valley Forge Military Academy and College (Wayne, Pennsylvania)

== Public, secondary schools ==
These military academies are part of the Junior Reserve Officers' Training Corps (JROTC) program and are partly funded by the United States Department of Defense. Chicago with six academies has more than any other city, a third of all in the country.

- Air Force Academy High School (Chicago, Illinois)
- Bridgeport Military Academy First Responders (Bridgeport, Connecticut)
- Carver Military Academy (Chicago, Illinois)
- Chicago Military Academy (Chicago, Illinois)
- Cleveland Junior Naval Academy (St. Louis, Missouri)
- Delaware Military Academy (Wilmington, Delaware)
- First State Military Academy (Smyrna, Delaware)
- Franklin Military Academy (Richmond, Virginia; the country’s first secondary military academy)
- Georgia Military College (Milledgeville, Georgia; coeducational, public but not part of University System of Georgia)
- Hollywood Hills Military Academy (Hollywood, Florida)
- Kenosha Military Academy (Wisconsin)
- Marine Academy of Science and Technology (Sandy Hook, New Jersey)
- Marine Math and Science Academy (Chicago, Illinois)
- New Mexico Military Institute (Roswell, New Mexico; coeducational)
- New Orleans Military and Maritime Academy (New Orleans, Louisiana)
- Oakland Military Institute (Oakland, California)
- Philadelphia Military Academy
- Phoenix Military Academy (Chicago, Illinois)
- Rickover Naval Academy (Chicago, Illinois)
- Sarasota Military Academy (Sarasota, Florida)
- Summerlin Military Academy (Bartow, Florida)
- Utah Military Academy (Riverdale, Utah)
- Utah Military Academy - Camp Williams (Lehi, Utah)

== Private, secondary schools ==
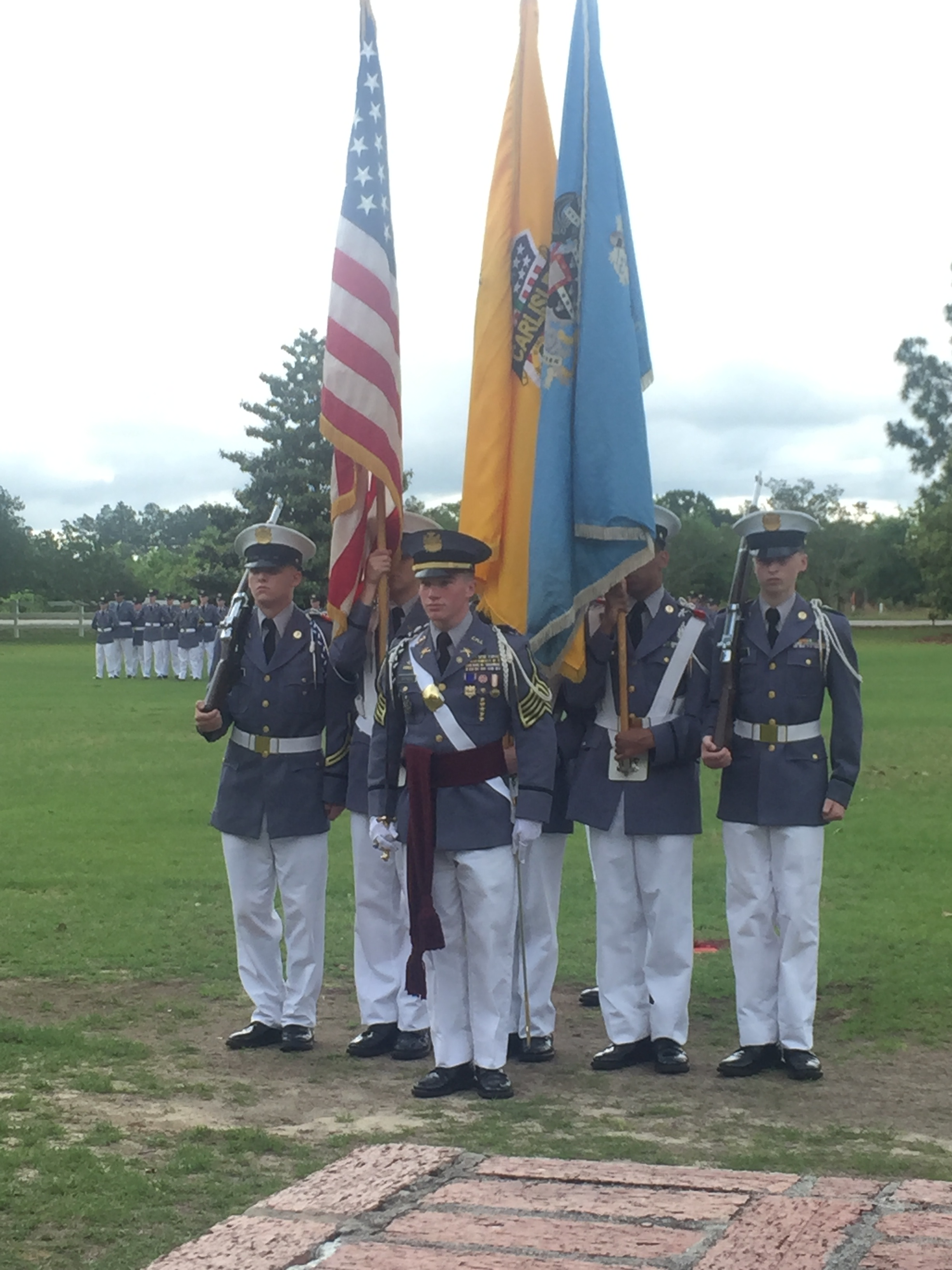
Cadets performing in a parade at Camden Military Academy (Camden, South Carolina)

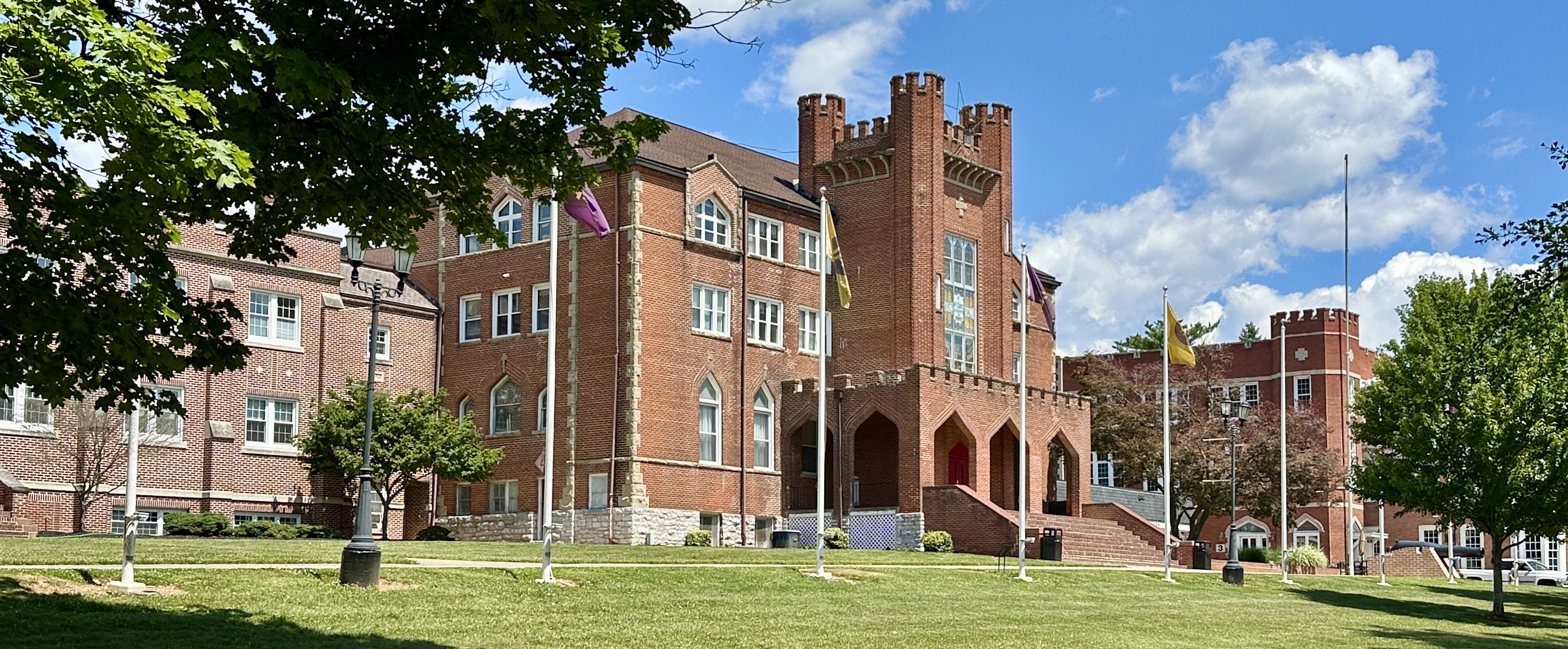
Massanutten Military Academy campus in Woodstock, Virginia

- Admiral Farragut Academy (St. Petersburg, Florida; coeducational)
- American Military Academy (Guaynabo, Puerto Rico; coeducational)
- Army and Navy Academy (Carlsbad, California)
- Benedictine College Preparatory (Richmond, Virginia)
- Benedictine Military School (Savannah, Georgia)
- Camden Military Academy (Camden, South Carolina)
- Christian Brothers Academy (Albany, New York)
- Culver Military Academy (Culver, Indiana)
- Fishburne Military School (Waynesboro, Virginia)
- Florida Preparatory Academy (Melbourne, Florida; coeducational from 2005)
- Fork Union Military Academy (Fork Union, Virginia)
- Hargrave Military Academy (Chatham, Virginia)
- La Salle Institute (Troy, New York)
- Southern Preparatory Academy (Camp Hill, Alabama)
- Marine Military Academy (Harlingen, Texas)
- Massanutten Academy (Woodstock, Virginia; coeducational)
- Missouri Military Academy (Mexico, Missouri)
- New York Military Academy (Cornwall-on-Hudson, New York; coeducational)
- Oak Ridge Military Academy (Oak Ridge, North Carolina; coeducational)
- Randolph-Macon Academy (Front Royal, Virginia; coeducational)
- Riverside Military Academy (Gainesville, Georgia)
- Saint Thomas Academy (Mendota Heights, Minnesota)
- St. Catherine's Academy (Anaheim, California; Kindergarten - 8th Grade; all boys)
- St. John's College High School (Washington, D.C.; first JROTC school in the USA; coeducational)
- St. John's Northwestern Military Academy (Delafield, Wisconsin)
- Southeastern Military Academy (Port St. Lucie, Florida)
- TMI — The Episcopal School of Texas (San Antonio, Texas

== See also ==
- Association of Military Colleges and Schools of the United States
- List of defunct United States military academies
- U.S. military staff colleges
