= Jason E. Bartolomei =

American Air Force General

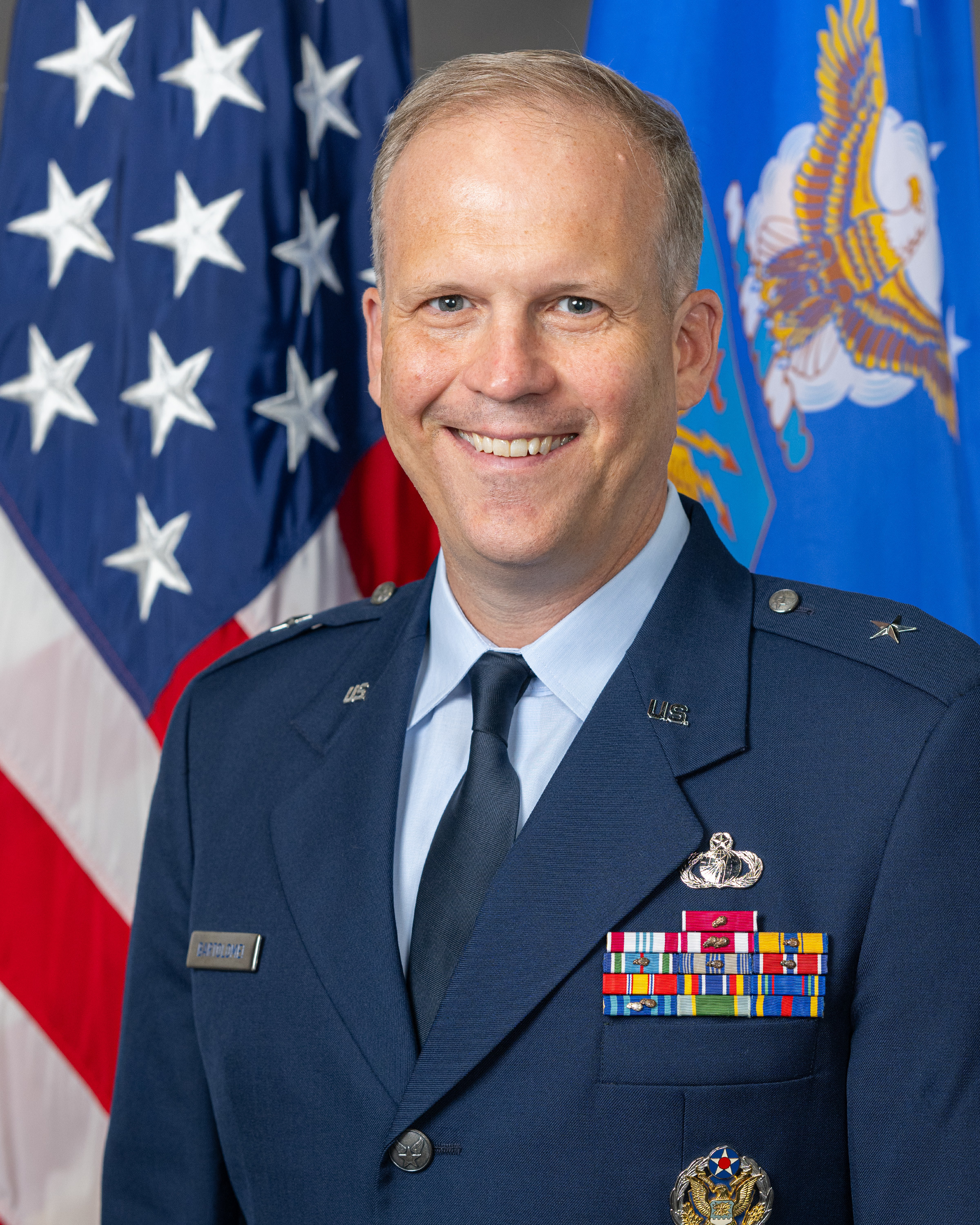
- Allegiance: United States of America
- Branch: United States Air Force
- Service years: 1997-present
- Rank: Brigadier General
- Commands: Air Force Research Laboratory
- Awards: Legion of Merit (2); Defense Meritorious Service Medal; Meritorious Service Medal (3); Air and Space Commendation Medal (3); Air and Space Achievement Medal (3); Joint Service Achievement Medal (3)

Jason E. Bartolomei is a retired Brigadier General in the United States Air Force and former Commander of the Air Force Research Laboratory.

== Career ==
Jason E. Bartolomei was commissioned as an officer in the Air Force in 1997. Soon thereafter, he was assigned to the development program for the Lockheed Martin F-22 Raptor. Following a tour with the Aeronautical Systems Center, Bartolomei was assigned to the United States Air Force Academy as Director of Systems Engineering and Assistant Professor of Engineering Mechanics.

In 2007, he was named as Chief of the Counter-Terrorism Support Team of the Joint Warfare Analysis Center. From 2010 to 2011, Bartolomei was assigned to the Office of U.S. Senator Orrin Hatch, who was later the Senate President Pro Tempore. Bartolomei then went to The Pentagon with the Office of the Assistant Secretary of the Air Force for Acquisition.

Bartolomei later spent several years with the Air Force Nuclear Weapons Center, where he eventually became a senior figure in the development of the LGM-35 Sentinel before moving to the Air Force Life Cycle Management Center in 2022. He took command of the Air Force Research Laboratory in 2024.

On June 2, 2025, Bartolomei spoke at the Memorandum of Understanding Agreement between the Air Force Research Laboratory and the State of Ohio on solving the "Valley of Death" problem.

Bartolomei was Commander of the Air Force Research Laboratory until June 2026, before retiring from the Air Force.

== Education ==
- Marquette University
- Air Force Institute of Technology
- Squadron Officer School
- Massachusetts Institute of Technology
- Air Command and Staff College
- Georgetown University
- Air War College
- Marine Corps War College
- Johns Hopkins University
