= Marine Corps War College =

Military training institution in the United States of America

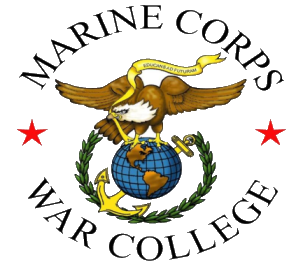
- Seal of the Marine Corps War College
- Type: Military Institution; War college
- Established: 1991
- Affiliations: Marine Corps University
- Dean: Christopher D. Yung, PhD
- Director: Col Brian Sharp, USMC
- Students: 30
- Location: Quantico, Virginia, U.S.
- Website: www.usmcu.edu

The Marine Corps War College (MCWAR) is the senior school of the Marine Corps University, providing Joint Professional Military Education (JPME) to selected United States military officers, civilian government officials, and international military officers. The college prepares officers for future senior command and staff responsibilities requiring exceptional operational competence, sound military judgment, and strategic thinking. The college is located within Marine Corps University aboard Marine Corps Base Quantico, Virginia.

== History ==
On 1 August 1990, the 29th Commandant of the Marine Corps, General Alfred M. Gray, Jr., instituted the Art of War Studies program under the Marine Corps Command and Staff College. General Gray's vision was to establish a "world-class educational institution for the study of war and the profession of arms." The original seminar was attended by six lieutenant colonels and was ten months long. The course of study matured into the current College and was patterned after other United States military senior-level service colleges. By 1999, the college became an accredited JPME Phase-I institution, enrolling 16 students from all five branches of the Armed Forces and various government agencies. In 2002, the college received full accreditation from both the United States Department of Education and the Southern Association of Colleges and Schools to confer a Master of Strategic Studies degree. In 2006, the college received JPME Phase-II accreditation. In 2009, the college expanded its student population and opened enrollment to include international military officers. The maximum enrollment each academic year is 30 students. In 2011, the college published the inaugural edition of the "MCWAR Papers" in cooperation with the Marine Corps University Press. The MCWAR papers is compilation of analytical papers by the college's students on strategic-level issue .

MCWAR is located in Dunlap Hall aboard Marine Corps Base Quantico, Virginia. Dunlap Hall is named in honor of Brigadier General Robert H. Dunlap, USMC.

== Curriculum ==
The curriculum is designed to ensure officers "develop intellectual and technical approaches to warfighting and strategic thinking, hone military judgment, evaluate methodologies, expand academic expertise, and sharpen teaching skills through reading, research, writing, and participation in seminars." In order to achieve this, the curriculum partners military competence with political, economic, social, and informational studies which converge to form a complete national strategy. Collaborative efforts provide a diverse educational experience: students routinely interact with policy makers such as the Secretary of Defense, the Chairman of the Joint Chiefs of Staff, the Secretary of Homeland Security, the Director of the FBI, the National Security Adviser, and members of congress. Non-government agencies such as JP Morgan, the Council on Foreign Relations, the New York Stock Exchange, and J Walter Thompson also supplement the college's coursework. Domestic and international travel opportunities are integrated with the curriculum. These travel opportunities have included trips to Unified Combatant Commands such as United States Central Command (USCENTCOM) as well as international trips to allies in Europe, Asia, and Latin America.

The curriculum is a ten-month resident program consisting of 33-38 credit hours in the following core courses:

- Leadership and Ethics
- Campaigning & Warfare
- National Security
- Joint Warfighting
- Diplomacy and Statecraft
- Advanced Studies Program

Extracurricular educational activities are offered through the auspices of The Marine Corps University, Library of the Marine Corps (Alfred M. Gray Research Center), National Museum of the Marine Corps, Marine Corps University Foundation, and Marine Corps Heritage Foundation.

Graduates are awarded a Master of Strategic Studies degree and JPME Phase II certification by the President of the Marine Corps University. The degree is accredited by the Southern Association of Colleges and Schools.

== Students and admissions ==
Admission to the college is based on allocations granted by the Commandant of the Marine Corps and are solicited each academic year through a Marine Administrative Message. The admissions policy supports the mission and purpose of the college and reflects the needs of the United States Marine Corps and the educational criteria of the Chairman of the Joint Chiefs of Staff's Officer Professional Military Education Policy. The student body is composed from three populations:

U.S. Military officers

- United States Marine Corps
- United States Army
- United States Air Force
- United States Navy
- United States Coast Guard
- United States Space Force

Government officials

- Central Intelligence Agency
- Defense Intelligence Agency
- Department of State
- Federal Bureau of Investigation
- United States Agency for International Development

International military officers have attended from

- Brazil
- Japan
- France
- Hashemite Kingdom of Jordan
- Georgian Republic
- Taiwan
- Canada
- New Zealand
- France
- South Korea
- Islamic Republic of Afghanistan
- Islamic Republic of Pakistan
- United Arab Emirates
- Mexico
- Republic of the Philippines
- Republic of Indonesia

U.S. military officers are admitted through their services' selection/assignment processes; Federal Government civilian employees are admitted through an invitational nomination and approval process; International military officers are selected through the Department of State.

As of 1995, the number of graduates promoted to O-6 (Colonel) was 93% which exceeds the Marine Corps average. Also, 96% have been selected for command.

== Notable alumni ==
- Jason E. Bartolomei, U.S. Air Force brigadier general
- Gina Bennett, American intelligence analyst
- John F. Goodman, U.S. Marine Corps 3 star general
- Ian Langford, Australian military officer
- Paul E. Lefebvre, U.S. Marine Corps major general
- William Liquori U.S. Space Force lieutenant general
- Austin S. Miller, U.S. Army 4 star general
- David Odom, U.S. Marine Corps major general
- William Ridenour, American politician
- Kevin Schneider, U.S. Air Force general

== See also ==
- National War College
- Industrial College of the Armed Forces
- Naval War College
- Army War College
- Air War College
- Marine Corps University
- United States Marine Corps Training and Education Command
- Marine Corps Combat Development Command
- School of Advanced Warfighting
