= Joint Professional Military Education =

Form of military education

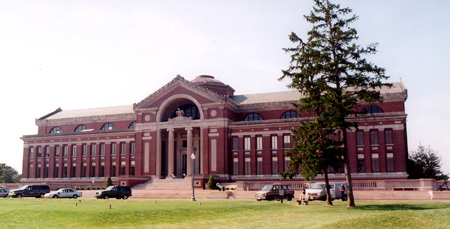
The National War College was the first senior school for JPME

Joint Professional Military Education (JPME) is a form of professional military education (PME) in the United States that emphasizes a multiservice approach. JPME was established following greater awareness during World War II of a need for effective cooperation between the branches of the United States Armed Forces. While some institutions had previously served to provide joint training, notably the Army and Navy Staff College that operated in the last years of the war, the first senior school for JPME was founded in 1946 under the direction of the chairman of the Joint Chiefs of Staff. The 1986 passage of the Goldwater–Nichols Act caused increased interest in JPME and created a standard. As of 2005, JPME contains five levels, successful completion of two of which are among the qualifications for the designation Joint Service Officer. JPME levels are available at a number of colleges and JPME Institutions.

== History ==
Prior to World War II, the branches of the United States military generally trained their staff independently, but new demands for collaborative efforts by services dedicated to ground, sea and air made clear the need for joint education. In December 1942, Commanding General of the Army Air Forces, General Hap Arnold, proposed a War College that might train officers for joint operations between the United States Army and Navy and develop new methods and doctrines for cooperative efforts during the war. To meet this need, in 1943, Arnold and his fellow Joint Chiefs of Staff established a temporary Army and Navy Staff College that provided four-month courses for officers through the end of the war.

During its operation, the Army and Navy Staff College's commandant, Lieutenant General John Dewitt was invited to lead a panel to develop recommendations for the future of joint military education, and the panel recommended the establishment of a national university that would incorporate a joint industrial college, joint war college and State Department college. At the same time, the Special Committee for Reorganization of the National Defense headed by Navy Admiral James Richardson (the Richardson Committee) began conducting national interviews that led to a highly controversial recommendation for a unified armed forces as well as a list of "three basic requirements" for joint military education and training: (1) adequate training to allow juniors to cooperatively enact joint plans, (2) joint education to allow officers to work together in drafting and enacting joint plans, and (3) joint education to allow officers at high levels to formulate and command large-scale, joint operations. While the United States Congress set about the slow course to developing the Department of Defense, the Joint Chiefs of Staff and other military personnel were at work attempting to structure joint military education.

The first few years after the war saw significant movement in these efforts. In 1946, the National War College—the first senior school for JPME under the Chairman of the Joint Chiefs of Staff—was founded, as one of the recommendations by a study headed by Lieutenant General Leonard Gerow. That same year, the Armed Forces Staff College (renamed in 2000 the Joint Forces Staff College (JFSC)) was opened under operation of the chief of naval operations, "to train selected officers of the armed forces in joint operations." Two years later, the recently renamed Industrial College of the Armed Forces (ICAF) was also a designated a "joint educational institution" and put under the direction of the Joint Chiefs of Staff. When, in 1976 a National Defense University (NDU) was created to provide structure to military education, the National War College and Industrial College of the Armed Forces were its first two constituents for joint military education. In 1981, the Armed Forces Staff College was also assigned to NDU.

Ongoing challenges in United States military preparedness for joint action was highlighted by 1980's Operation Eagle Claw, and events such as the 1983 Beirut barracks bombings emphasized the need for proper cooperative training. The 1986 passage of the Goldwater-Nichols Act meant to help overcome barriers between intraservice cooperation popularized JPME by making it a requirement for becoming a Joint Staff Officer. The Act also mandated standards for JPME education.

== JPME levels ==
There are five levels of JPME defined by the Officer Professional Military Education Policy issued in December 2005:

1. preparatory JPME taught to undergraduates and during primary military education;
2. Phase I taught at intermediate and senior levels;
3. Phase II;
4. single-phase programs offered at select institutions; and
5. General/Field Officer course.

Successful completion of both Phase I and Phase II of the JPME are among the qualifications for the designation Joint Staff Officer (JSO).

== Program for Joint Education ==
The Program for Joint Education (PJE) is an umbrella term used to refer to the approach utilized in JPME. Multiple aspects of Joint Professional Military Education are encompassed in the term; curricula, standards, and education objectives are a component of PJE, as are the ratio of military branches represented among students and faculty and the ratio of student to faculty. The PJE is assessed through the Program for Accreditation of Joint Education (PAJE) administered by PAJE teams appointed by the Chairman of the Joint Chiefs of Staff.

== Institutions ==
Under the umbrella of the National Defense University (NDU), JPME is offered by a number of joint colleges and four JPME institutions: the National War College, the College of Information and Cyberspace, the College of International Security Affairs, the Eisenhower School, and the Joint Forces Staff College. These institutions maintain a joint focus and a multiple-service student body and faculty.

A number of schools, including the NDU and Military Service Colleges, are approved to provide JPME Phase I credits to their student bodies. While formerly JPME Phase II credits were available at a very limited number of schools, recent changes in regulations have expanded their availability. As of 2006, the Joint Forces Staff College was approved to provide Phase II credits, including through its Joint & Combined Warfighting School, while the National War College and the Industrial College of the Armed Forces were entitled to offer both Phase I and Phase II. By 2007, the U.S. Army War College, the College of Naval Warfare of the Naval War College, Marine Corps War College and the Air War College were all accredited to offer both Phase I and II.
