= Frances C. Wilson =

United States Marine Corps general

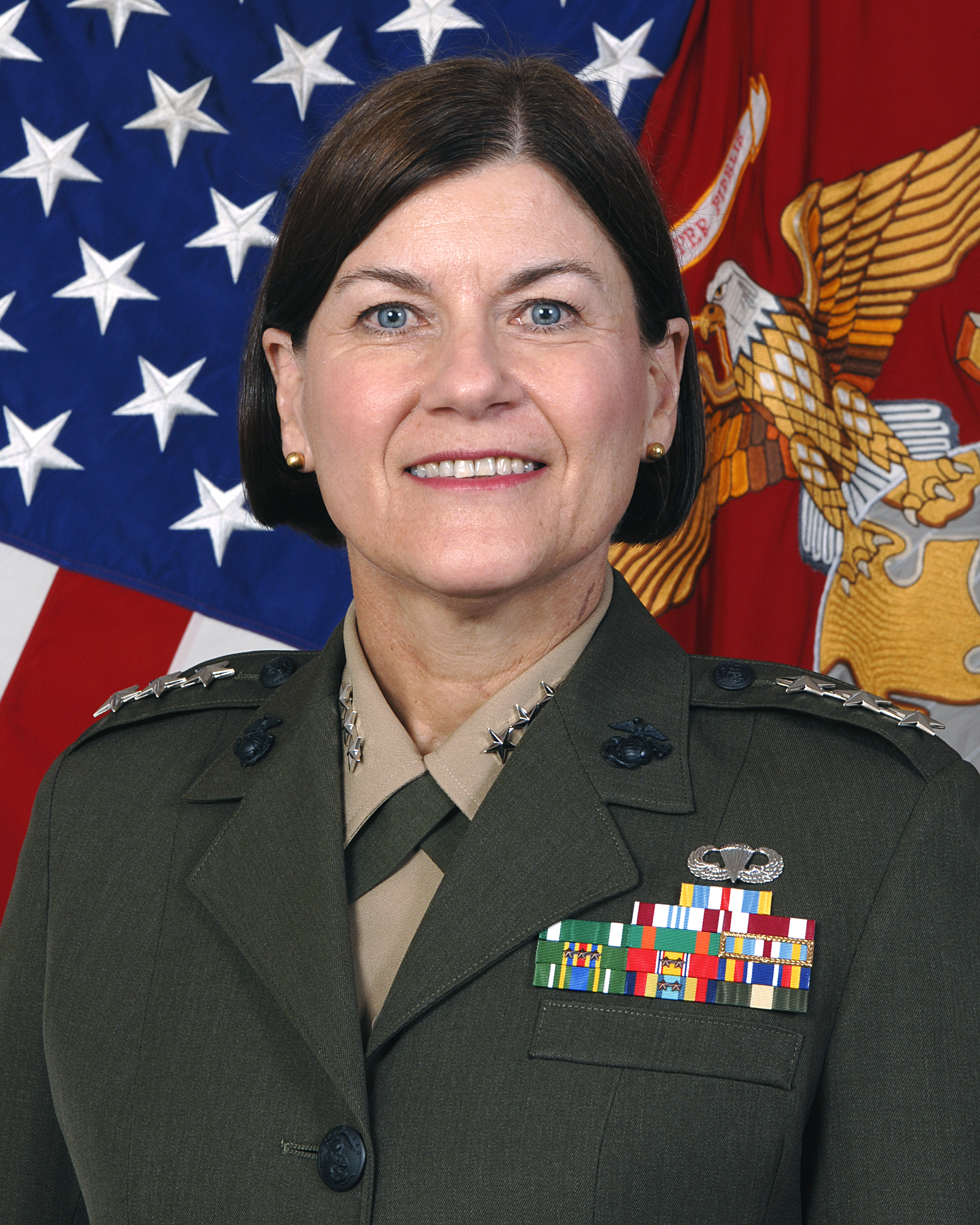
- Born: Nassau County, New York, U.S.
- Spouse: Captain Edward D. Heuer
- Relatives: Rear Admiral Mary O'Donnell (sister)
- Military career
- Allegiance: United States
- Branch: United States Marine Corps
- Service years: 1972–2009
- Rank: Lieutenant General
- Commands: National Defense University; Marine Corps Base Quantico; 3rd Force Service Support Group
- Awards: Navy Distinguished Service Medal; Defense Superior Service Medal (2)

Frances Carlotta Wilson is a retired United States Marine Corps lieutenant general, who served as the 12th president of the National Defense University.

== Early life and education ==
Wilson was born in Nassau County, in Long Island, New York, to Frances and John Wilson, a United States Air Force officer.

Wilson grew up in Arlington County, Virginia, and earned a Bachelor of Science degree in social science teaching from Michigan State University in 1971. She later earned Master's degrees in education from Pepperdine University, psychology from the University of Northern Colorado, business management from Salve Regina College, National Security and Strategic Studies from Naval War College, and a Doctor of Education from the University of Southern California in 1981. She also completed the United States Army Basic Airborne Course, Armed Forces Staff College's Joint and Combined Staff Officer School, National Defense University's CAPSTONE and PINNACLE courses, Naval Postgraduate School's Revolution in Business Practices, and Harvard University's JFK School of Government's Senior Executive Course in National and International Security.

Wilson's sister, Mary O'Donnell is a retired United States Coast Guard rear admiral, who in 2000 became the first woman to become a reserve rear admiral in the Coast Guard. At the time of O'Donnell's retirement in 2004, Wilson and her sister were the highest ranking sisters in the United States Military.

== Military career ==
Commissioned a second lieutenant in November 1972, Wilson was the Honor Graduate and recipient of the Leadership Award from the United States Marine Corps Women Officer Basic School. As a company grade officer, Wilson served as an Air Traffic Control Officer at Yuma and Kaneohe Marine Corps Air Stations and as an instructor at Marine Corps Development and Education Center's Instructional Management School. Following graduation from Amphibious Warfare School in 1980, she served as Staff Secretary, 3rd Marine Division, III Marine Amphibious Force.

As a field grade officer, Wilson was a company officer, Brigade of Midshipmen, and an assistant professor in the Professional Development Department at the United States Naval Academy. After graduating with the 1985 class of the College of Naval Command and Staff, Naval War College, she reported to the Manpower Plans, Manpower and Reserve Affairs Department, Headquarters Marine Corps as a manpower management analyst. She then served as special assistant for general and flag officer matters, Joint Staff, and as executive assistant to the Vice Director, Joint Staff.

Wilson commanded the Fourth Recruit Training Battalion at Parris Island Recruit Depot from 1988 to 1990. She then participated in a Federal Executive Fellowship with the Brookings Institution before reporting to the Marine Forces Pacific staff as Requirements and Programs Officer. In July 1993, she assumed command of Camp H. M. Smith and the headquarters and services battalion, Marine Forces Pacific. Returning to Washington, D.C., in 1995, she participated on Roles and Missions Coordination Group, Requirements and Plans, Headquarters Marine Corps, before being assigned as secretary, Joint Staff.

Wilson commanded Marine Corps Base Quantico and the 3rd Force Service Support Group, III Marine Expeditionary Force. She then directed Manpower Management Division, Manpower and Reserve Affairs, Headquarters Marine Corps and was the Marine Corps representative to the Secretary of Defense's Reserve Force Policy Board.

From 2003 to 2006, Wilson served as commandant of the Industrial College of the Armed Forces, National Defense University. In 2006, she was appointed president of the National Defense University. On July 14, 2006, Wilson was promoted to lieutenant general and assumed her post as the 12th president of the university, succeeding United States Air Force Lieutenant General Michael M. Dunn. In March 2009, she was awarded the French Legion of Honor in a ceremony presided by French Defense Minister Hervé Morin at the French embassy in Washington, D.C. Wilson retired from active military service on September 1, 2009.

== Awards and decorations ==
=== Medals and ribbons ===
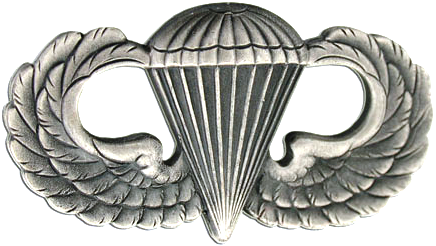

Basic Parachutist Insignia
	Navy Distinguished Service Medal |Defense Superior Service Medal w/ oak leaf cluster		
Defense Meritorious Service Medal	Meritorious Service Medal	Navy and Marine Corps Commendation Medal	Navy and Marine Corps Achievement Medal
Joint Meritorious Unit Award w/ oak leak cluster	Navy Meritorious Unit Commendation w/ 3 service stars	National Defense Service Medal w/ 2 service stars	Global War on Terrorism Service Medal
Korea Defense Service Medal	Navy Sea Service Deployment Ribbon w/ 2 service stars	Marine Corps Drill Instructor Ribbon	Legion of Honor, Officer
Office of the Secretary of Defense Identification Badge		Office of the Joint Chiefs of Staff Identification Badge	

== See also ==
- Carol Mutter, USMC — first woman to reach three-star rank in the U.S. military
- List of female United States military generals and flag officers

== Notes ==
Military offices
Preceded by Michael M. Dunn	President of the National Defense University; 2006–2009	Succeeded by Ann E. Rondeau
