= USAF Air War College =

Senior professional military education school of the U.S. Air Force

Air War College
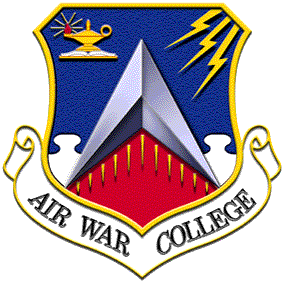
- Type: War college
- Established: 1946
- Location: Montgomery, Alabama, US
- Campus: Maxwell-Gunter AFB
- Website: airuniversity.af.edu/awc

The Air War College (AWC) is a professional military education school at Air University under the United States Air Force. The college is located at Maxwell Air Force Base in Montgomery, Alabama, United States.

The college emphasizes the employment of air, space, and cyberspace in joint operations. It is one of six war colleges within the United States Department of Defense's Joint Professional Military Education (JPME) Phase II Education Program for commissioned officers.

== History ==
The Air War College was founded in 1946 by the United States War Department (subsequently merged with the Navy Department to form the Department of Defense) as a U.S. Army Air Forces program at what was then Maxwell Field. The college has operated continuously since its founding except for a period of six months during the Korean War.

AWC operates alongside the Army War College, the Naval War College's College of Naval Warfare, the Marine Corps War College, and the National Defense University's National War College (NWC), Joint Forces Staff College (JFSC) and Dwight D. Eisenhower School for National Security and Resource Strategy (Eisenhower School) within the U.S. Department of Defense's JPME II Education Program for commissioned officers.

== Professional military education ==
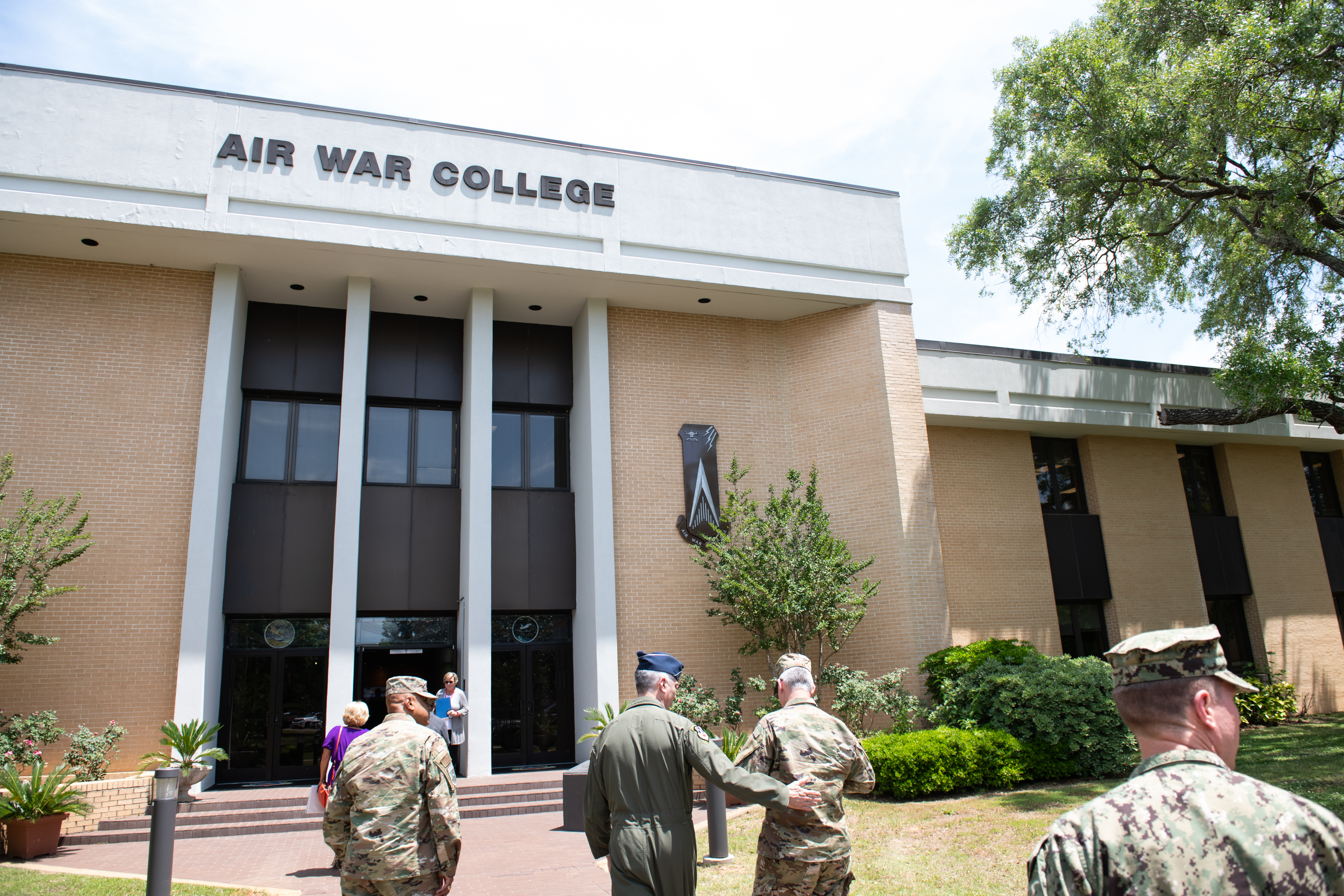
Outside the Air War College in 2019

In 2006, the Air War College (AWC) curriculum was certified as a JPME Phase II program by the Joint Chiefs of Staff for AWC classes in Academic Year 2007 and subsequent.

According to the Air War College webpage, "The AWC resident program class membership includes senior officers in the ranks of Lieutenant Colonel (O-5) and Colonel (O-6), or, in the case of the U.S. Navy and U.S. Coast Guard, Commander (O-5) and Captain (O-6), from each U.S. military service (both Active Component and Reserve Component, the latter to include the Army National Guard and the Air National Guard). AWC students also include civilian employees of federal government agencies at the grades GS-14/GM-14 or GS-15/GM-15, and equivalent rank military officers from the international community of nations."

The Distance Learning version of AWC is conducted by the Air Force Global College (AFGC) - College of Online Professional Military Education (COOL PME), a separate school within Air University. It has different curriculum and admission eligibility than the in-residence version and is not certified to grant JPME-2 Credit.

Eligible senior member lieutenant colonels and above of the Civil Air Patrol (CAP), the civilian U.S. Air Force Auxiliary, who possess a minimum of a bachelor's degree are also entitled to enroll in the Air War College. Although they are precluded from attending in residence, CAP senior member officers may complete the AWC curriculum in a traditional classroom setting with U.S. military officers and senior DoD and DAF civilians as part of a year-long on-base seminar program at an active USAF installation if they already have base access authorization (automatic for senior members who are military retirees or active status reservists or national guardsmen), or through distance learning.

The AWC resident program at Maxwell AFB consists of ten months of postgraduate level courses for a total of 36 semester credit hours. Graduates receive a Master of Strategic Studies. Non-resident AWC students attending the parallel track 10-month classroom seminar program at either the Pentagon and/or at other USAF installations worldwide, are also eligible to receive graduate level academic credit, albeit at a lesser number of credit hours.

Completion of the Air War College via in-residence, distance learning, or in-residence completion of an equivalent senior level war college program of another service, or that of a senior level joint institution such as the National War College or the Dwight D. Eisenhower School for National Security and Resource Strategy, is considered a de facto requirement for all lieutenant colonels (O-5) in the U.S. Air Force, to include the Air Force Reserve and the Air National Guard, to promote to colonel (O-6) and to be competitive for future selection as a general officer.

== Course description ==
The Air War College is an advanced postgraduate program that functions as the senior professional military education (PME) school of the U.S. Air Force. It emphasizes the development of joint knowledges, skills and attributes required of all Air Force, Sister Service, and international senior officers as well as Department of Defense and other National Security civilians, with special focus on their application to large organization and institutional leadership responsibilities.

The resident course is ten months in duration. The college also offers a ten-month non-resident seminar program on select active USAF installations and at the Pentagon which mirrors the same ten-month academic schedule of the resident program. There is also a non-resident Air War College CD-ROM/correspondence course that is typically completed in 24 months or less.

The Air War College's Mission is to: "prepare students to lead in a joint, interagency and multinational environment at the strategic level across the range of military operations; to develop cross-domain mastery of joint air, space, and cyberspace power and its strategic contributions to national security; and to advance innovative thought on National Security, Department of Defense and Air Forces issues."

The AWC curriculum focuses on five learning areas of emphasis:

- Learning Area 1: Profession of Arms Emphasis. Graduates are capable of leading in a joint environment at the strategic level across the range of military operations.
- Learning Area 2: Warfare Studies Emphasis. Graduates make sound judgments on the cross-domain use of joint air, space and cyberspace power to maintain national security.
- Learning Area 3: Leadership Studies Emphasis. Graduates are prepared to exercise transformational leadership at group/wing command and above levels in service, joint, and coalition settings.
- Learning Area 4: International Security Studies Emphasis. Graduates are equipped to advance innovative thought on national security, Department of Defense and Air Force issues.
- Learning Area 5: Communication Studies Emphasis. Graduates can communicate complex information in a clear, concise and logical manner in both written and oral formats.

== National Security Forum ==
Each year the Air War College (AWC) also hosts the National Security Forum (NSF), the NSF program being sponsored by the Secretary of the Air Force. NSF began in 1954 as an expansion of the Civilian Outreach Seminars held from 1947 through 1949.

The purpose of the NSF is to expose influential citizens to senior U.S. and international military officers and civilian equivalents in order to engage each other's ideas and perspectives on Air Force, national and international security issues. It is also an opportunity for the AWC students, as future military leaders, to interact with a broad cross-section of civilian leaders from businesses, industry, academia, public education, media, law, the clergy, and state and local governments, said civilian leaders possessing limited to no prior military experience.

Because of that latter caveat, retired career military personnel, military personnel serving part-time in the Reserve Components (to include the Army National Guard and Air National Guard), Department of Defense and U.S. Coast Guard civilian personnel, civilian spouses of military personnel, senior members of the Civil Air Patrol, and U.S. congressional members are precluded from being NSF attendees.

The NSF provides a frank and candid exchange of views on national security matters among NSF attendees, Air War College students, and senior military and civilian leaders. The week is devoted to exploring many issues that affect the current and future security of the country. Specific objectives are:

• To provide an extended opportunity for candid engagement of ideas on future and current Air Force, national and international security issues among the Air War College students, faculty, and invited guests of the Secretary of the Air Force (e.g., the NSF attendees).

• To provide a unique forum in which experts on various aspects of national and international security may discuss their views with students, faculty, and our NSF attendees. The NSF is also intended to broaden perspectives and garner a mutual understanding of the U.S. Air Force and national and international security issues between NSF attendees and senior U.S. and international officers and civilian equivalents.

Guests are nominated from across the Air Force and by active and retired Regular Air Force, Air Force Reserve and Air National Guard general officers and previous NSF attendees. AWC forwards the nominations to the Secretary of the Air Force for his/her approval and his/her personal invitation. Approximately 150 selectees attend NSF each year. Specific details for NSF are provided with each nominee's invitation. Budgetary constraints preclude the Air Force from defraying guests' expenses. As a result, guests are responsible for their own transportation to Maxwell AFB, the cost of Distinguished Visitors Quarters (DVQ) lodging at Maxwell AFB, and the cost of meals.

== Accreditation ==
The umbrella organization for AWC, the Air University, is accredited by the Commission of Colleges of the Southern Association of Colleges and Schools (SACS), and is authorized to grant the following degrees:

Master of Strategic Studies – offered by the Air War College

Master of Military Operational Art and Science – offered by the Air Command and Staff College (ACSC)

Master of Aerospace Studies – offered by the School of Advanced Air and Space Studies (SAASS)

Master of Science in Flight Test Engineering – offered by the U.S. Air Force Test Pilot School (USAFTPS)

Associate in Applied Science – offered for USAF enlisted personnel by the Community College of the Air Force (CCAF) with majors in 68 areas

== Notable personnel ==
- Ed Gallrein, farmer, former Navy SEAL officer, Republican Party nominee in the U.S. House of Representatives election for Kentucky's fourth congressional district in 2026.
- Paul D. Phillips, former member of the staff & faculty; West Point graduate, retired as a Brigadier General.

== See also ==
- National War College
- Dwight D. Eisenhower School for National Security and Resource Strategy (formerly known as the Industrial College of the Armed Forces)
- Army War College
- Naval War College
- Marine Corps War College
