= John S. Pustay =

United States Air Force general

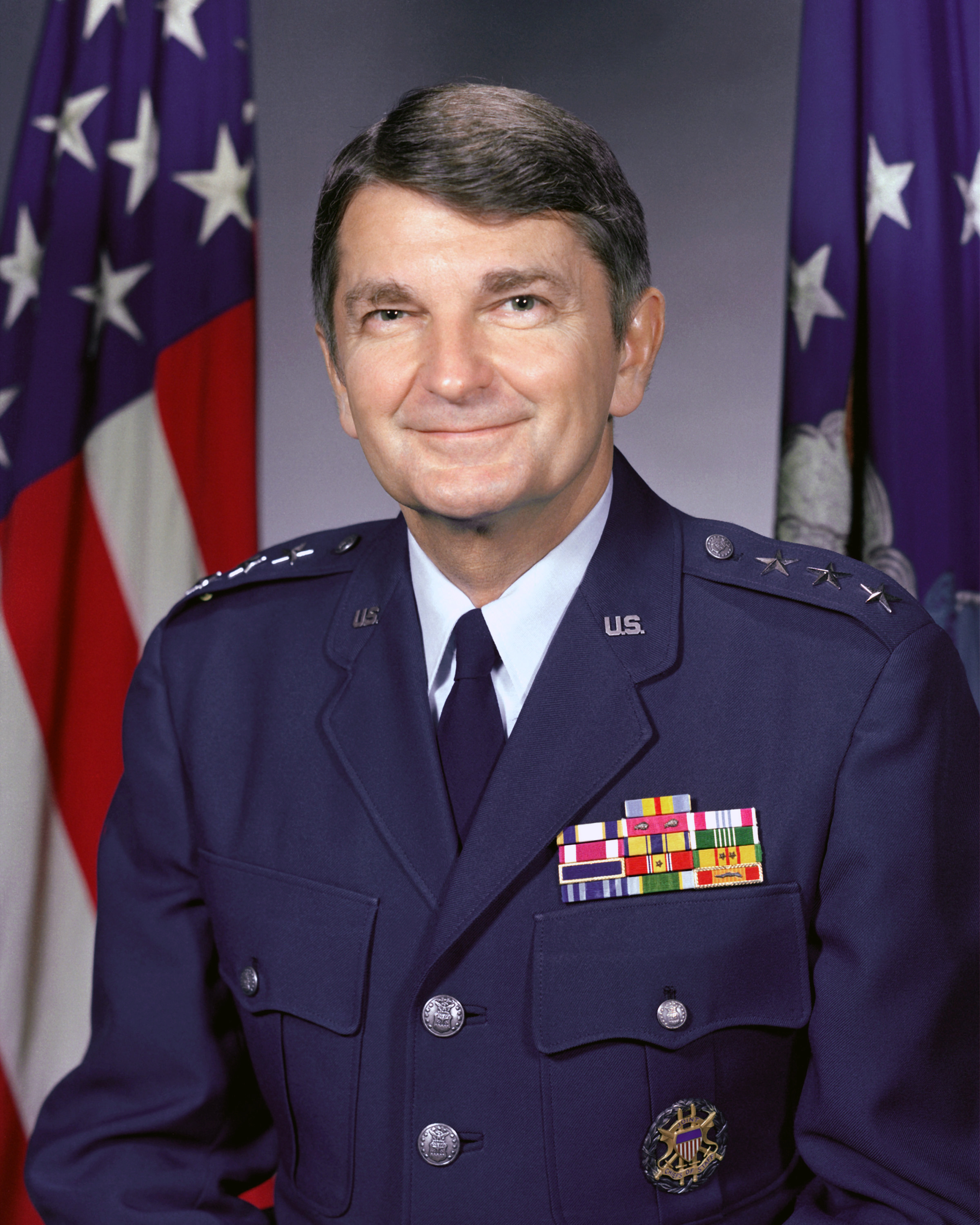
- Born: July 15, 1931 (age 95); Roebling, New Jersey, U.S.
- Military career
- Allegiance: United States of America
- Branch: United States Air Force
- Service years: 1954–1983
- Rank: Lieutenant General
- Awards: Defense Distinguished Service Medal, Distinguished Service Medal (Air Force), Legion of Merit with two oak leaf clusters, Defense Meritorious Service Medal, Meritorious Service Medal, Air Force Commendation Medal with oak leaf cluster, Presidential Unit Citation emblem, Vietnam Service Medal with two service stars, Republic of Vietnam Gallantry Cross with palm

John Stephen Pustay (born July 15, 1931) was a lieutenant general in the United States Air Force who served as president of the National Defense University from July 1981 to October 1983.

== Biography ==
Pustay was born in 1931, in Roebling, New Jersey. He graduated from Florence Township Memorial High School, and attended Rutgers University. He graduated from the U.S. Naval Academy in 1954 with a Bachelor of Science degree and a commission in the U.S. Air Force. He received a master's degree from San Francisco State University in 1960, a doctorate from the Graduate School of International Studies of the University of Denver in 1963 and graduated from the Industrial College of the Armed Forces at Fort Lesley J. McNair, in 1970. After graduation from the U.S. Naval Academy, Pustay attended the Intelligence Officer Course at Lowry Air Force Base, and then served with Headquarters Eastern Air Defense Force, Stewart Air Force Base

From September to October 1955, he served as an air intelligence officer for the 502nd Tactical Control Group at Osan Air Base, South Korea. He then transferred to Japan as intelligence officer for the 39th Fighter-Interceptor Squadron at Komaki Air Base. In July 1957, he was assigned to 5th Air Force, Fuchu Air Station, Japan, as staff intelligence officer, Directorate of Estimates, Office of the Deputy Chief of Staff, Intelligence.

Pustay was assigned to the U.S. Air Force Academy in Colorado Springs, in February 1960 as an instructor in the political science department. In 1963 he became an associate professor of political science and later was the assistant dean of the faculty.

In September 1966, Pustay was appointed a White House fellow and served as executive assistant to the secretary of state, with duty at the White House and Department of State. Upon completion of the fellowship, he was assigned to Headquarters U.S. Air Force, Washington, D.C., as a long-range plans officer in the Office of the Deputy Chief of Staff, Plans and Operations. From 1965 to 1969, Pustay completed several temporary duty assignments in Southeast Asia. While there he dealt with psychological warfare and counterguerrilla operations. He joined Supreme Headquarters Allied Powers Europe, Belgium, in July 1970 and initially served as a strategic planner and nuclear planner. He established and later directed the first Supreme Headquarters Allied Powers Europe division for nuclear policy and in July 1971, Pustay became executive to the chief of staff, Supreme Headquarters Allied Powers Europe.

In January 1973, Pustay transferred to Washington, D.C., to serve as executive assistant to the secretary of the Air Force. In April 1974 he was assigned as deputy assistant chief of staff, intelligence at Air Force headquarters. During this assignment General Pustay headed several special projects. In February 1975 he directed a bicommand project establishing an integrated tactical information system for operations in Central Europe. In January 1976 General Pustay was designated chief, Air Force Budget Issues Team, a special staff tasked with integrating U.S. Air Force positions in preparation for the annual congressional budget exercise. In April 1976, Pustay was made special assistant to the chief of staff for Airborne Warning and Control System matters.

While retaining his special Air Force Budget Issues Team and Airborne Warning and Control System responsibilities, he became the Air Force's principal long-range planner as director of doctrine, concepts and objectives in October 1976.

In August 1977, Pustay assumed command of Keesler Technical Training Center, Keesler Air Force Base. He was responsible for managing a training mission that produces some 15,000 officer and airman graduates annually in more than 300 courses conducted worldwide. General Pustay also had management responsibility for a base population of more than 28,000, a budget of $200 million, maintenance support for two operational Military Airlift Command and Tactical Air Command flying units and host support for the Air Force's second-largest medical facility.

He was assigned as assistant to the chairman of the Organization of the Joint Chiefs of Staff in June 1979. He represented the Joint Chiefs of Staff in the highest councils of national government and served as the principal adviser to the chairman.

His military decorations and awards include the Defense Distinguished Service Medal, Distinguished Service Medal (Air Force), Legion of Merit with two oak leaf clusters, Defense Meritorious Service Medal, Meritorious Service Medal, Air Force Commendation Medal with oak leaf cluster, Presidential Unit Citation emblem, Vietnam Service Medal with two service stars and Republic of Vietnam Gallantry Cross with palm.

Pustay is a member of the Council on Foreign Relations and has written several publications. These include a book, "Counterinsurgency Warfare" published in 1965 by the Free Press: MacMillan Inc., one of the first works on this subject in the English language. He has also contributed many articles on guerrilla and counterinsurgency warfare to various professional and academic journals and is a contributing author for the "Encyclopedia Americana."

He was promoted to lieutenant general on July 1, 1979, and retired on October 1, 1983.
