= Ann E. Rondeau =

United States Navy admiral

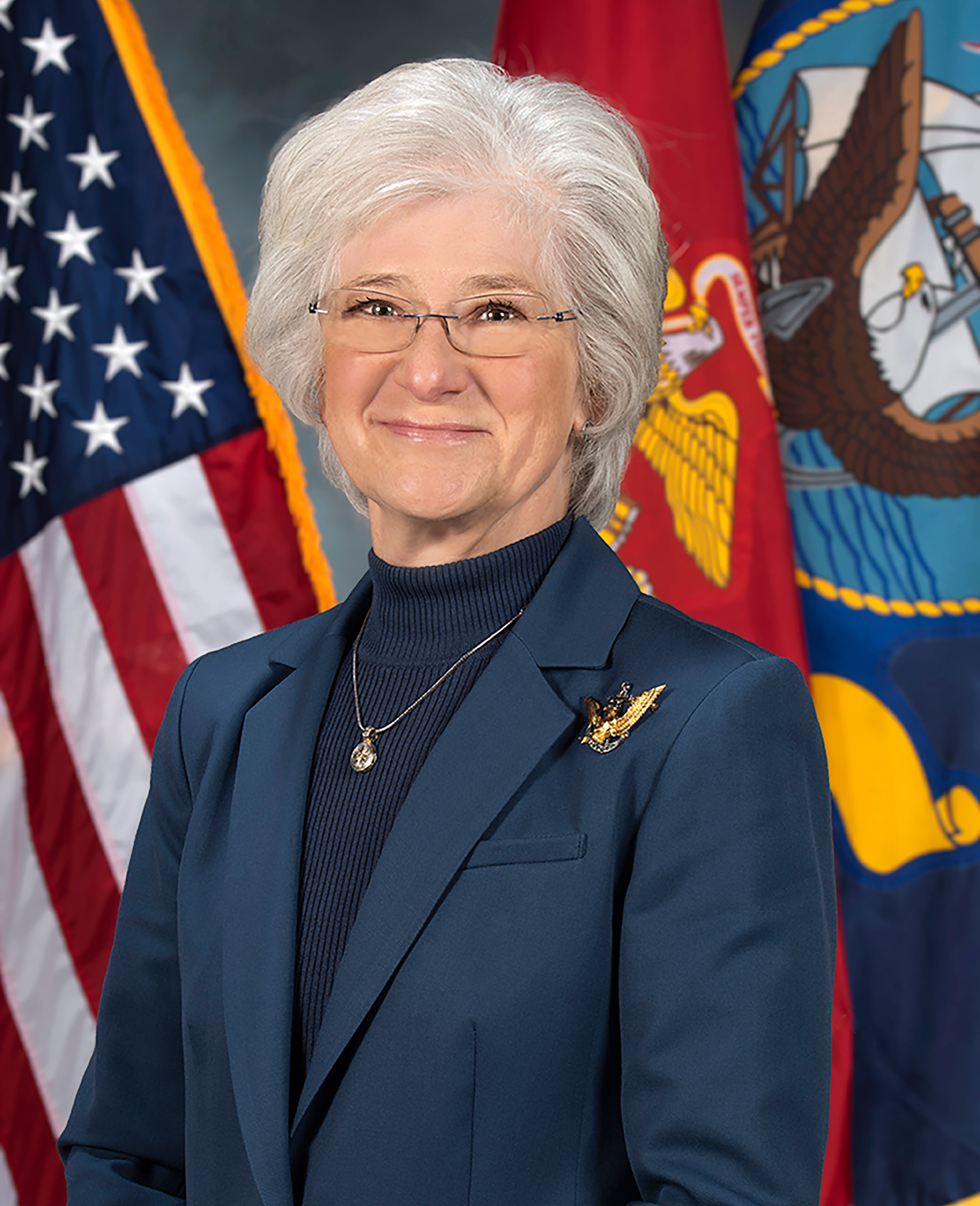
- Rondeau as President of the Naval Postgraduate School
- Born: 1951 (age 74–75)
- Military career
- Allegiance: United States
- Branch: United States Navy
- Service years: 1974–2012
- Rank: Vice Admiral
- Commands: Naval Personnel Development Command; Naval Service Training Command; Naval Training Center Great Lakes; Naval Support Activity Mid-South
- Awards: Defense Distinguished Service Medal (2); Navy Distinguished Service Medal; Defense Superior Service Medal; Legion of Merit (4)

Ann Elisabeth Rondeau is a retired United States Navy vice admiral. During her tenure in the navy, she received two Defense Distinguished Service Medals, the Navy Distinguished Service Medal, and four Legion of Merit awards. Rondeau was the president of National Defense University and, after serving as the president of the College of DuPage, was chosen by United States Secretary of the Navy Richard V. Spencer to be president of the Naval Postgraduate School in 2019.

== Education ==
Rondeau earned a history degree from Eisenhower College in 1973. She was named most distinguished graduate by the board of trustees and received the Groben Award for Leadership. In 1982, Rondeau received her master's degree in comparative government from Georgetown University. She attended Northern Illinois University for her doctoral studies. Rondeau was awarded an honorary doctoral degree in public service from Carthage College.

== Naval career ==
In 1974, Rondeau received her commission through the United States Navy's Officer Candidate School. She was commander of Pacific Fleet Communications from 1974 until 1976 and air intelligence officer and operations officer to Patrol Squadron Fifty from 1976 until 1980. She became part of the navy staff of the NATO-Europe branch of Strategy and Policy in 1982, and became assistant to the Office of the Secretary of Defense focused on policy analysis before being assigned to the Office of African Affairs. She was named a White House Fellow in 1985, and served as special assistant to the Attorney General for national security affairs. She became executive officer of Fast Sealift Squadron One in 1987, as well as officer in charge of the Military Sealift Command Unit in New Orleans. In 1989, Rondeau became assistant for political-military analysis of the Chief of Naval Operations Executive Panel. Rondeau became second battalion officer at the United States Naval Academy in 1990, and was named commanding officer of Naval Support Activity in La Maddelena, Italy in 1992. She later became a CNO Fellow on the Strategic Studies Group in Newport, Rhode Island before becoming military assistant to the United States Principal Deputy Under Secretary of Defense for policy in 1995.

Rondeau joined the navy's Quadrennial Defense Review Support Office in 1996 and served as commanding officer of Naval Support Activity Mid-South in 1997. She became chief of staff for shore installation of the United States Pacific Fleet Staff commander in chief in 1999. In 2001, Rondeau became commander of the Naval Training Center Great Lakes, and was named rear admiral in 2002. In 2003, Rondeau was named commander of Naval Service Training Command. In 2004, she became commander of Naval Personnel Development Command. In 2005, she was named director of Navy Staff and became a vice admiral. In 2006, she became deputy commander of United States Transportation Command.

Rondeau retired as a vice admiral in the United States Navy on April 11, 2012.

== Academic career ==
In July 2009, Rondeau was named president of the National Defense University. Rondeau was a speaker at the 2010 Fortune Most Powerful Women Summit.

In May 2016, Rondeau was named the sixth president of the College of DuPage, Illinois' largest community college. She was the first female president in the school's history.

On October 10, 2018, Secretary of the Navy Richard V. Spencer named Rondeau as the next president of the Naval Postgraduate School, with her term beginning on January 1, 2019. She became the 50th President of the institution on January 29, 2019, replacing Vice Admiral (retired) Ronald A. Route.

Rondeau is a member of the National Association of Corporate Directors and a member of the Executive Committee of Council for Higher Education Accreditation. She also worked as a consultant with Allen Austin's Total Performance Leadership initiative and IBM's The Watson Group.

== See also ==
- List of female United States military generals and flag officers

Military offices
Preceded by Robert T. Dail	Deputy Commander of the United States Transportation Command; 2006–2009	Succeeded by Mark D. Harnitchek
Preceded by Norton A. Schwartz	Commander of the United States Transportation Command; Acting; 2008	Succeeded by Duncan J. McNabb
Preceded by Frances C. Wilson	President of the National Defense University; 2009–2012	Succeeded by Gregg F. Martin
Academic offices
Preceded by Joseph E. Collins; Acting	President of the College of DuPage; 2016–2019	Succeeded by Joseph E. Collins; Acting
Preceded by Ronald A. Route	President of the Naval Postgraduate School; 2019–present	Succeeded by Incumbent
