= Unified combatant command =

United States Department of Defense command

A unified combatant command, also referred to as a combatant command (CCMD), is a joint military command of the United States Department of Defense that is composed of units from two or more service branches of the United States Armed Forces, and conducts broad and continuing missions. There are currently 11 unified combatant commands, and each is established as the highest echelon of military commands, in order to provide effective command and control of all U.S. military forces, regardless of service branch, during both peace and war time. CCMDs are organized either on a geographical basis (known as an "area of responsibility", AOR) or on a functional basis, e.g., special operations, force projection, transport, and cybersecurity. Currently, seven CCMDs are geographical, and four are functional. CCMDs have specific badges denoting their affiliation.

The Unified Command Plan (UCP) establishes the missions, command responsibilities, and geographic areas of responsibility of the CCMDs. Each time the UCP is updated, the organizations are reviewed for efficiency, efficacy, and alignment with national policy. Each CCMD is led by a combatant commander (CCDR), who is a four-star general or admiral. The combatant commanders are entrusted with a specific type of nontransferable operational command authority over assigned forces, regardless of branch of service. The chain of command for operational purposes (per the Goldwater–Nichols Act) goes from the president of the United States through the secretary of defense to the combatant commanders.

== Command authority ==
The Department of Defense defines at least four types of command authority:

1. COCOM – combatant command (legal authority): unitary control not further delegatable by the combatant commander (CCDR) within their geographic or functional combatant command (CCMD).
2. ADCON – administrative control of the command function of "obtaining resources, direction for training, methods of morale and discipline"
3. OPCON – operational control of a command function, e.g., sustainment. In that case, OPCON is embodied in the Army Field Support Brigades (AFSBs)
4. TACON – tactical control of sustainment, for example, as embodied in a Contracting Support Brigade

== List of combatant commands ==
Geographic combatant commands' (excluding Space Command) areas of responsibility

Combatant Command (Acronym)	Established	HQ	Name	Branch	Start
Geographic combatant commands
Africa Command (USAFRICOM)	1 October 2008 (Note: U.S. Africa Command was established on 1 October 2007, as a sub-unified command under U.S. European Command. It separated from U.S. European Command and was elevated to full unified command status on 1 October 2008.)	Kelley Barracks, Stuttgart, Germany^{‡}	General; Dagvin Anderson	USAF	15 August 2025
Central Command (USCENTCOM)	1 January 1983	MacDill Air Force Base, Florida^{‡}	Admiral; Brad Cooper	USN	8 August 2025
European Command (USEUCOM)	1 August 1952	Patch Barracks, Stuttgart, Germany	General; Alexus Grynkewich	USAF	1 July 2025
Indo-Pacific Command (USINDOPACOM)	1 January 1947	Camp H. M. Smith, Hawaii	Admiral; Samuel Paparo	USN	3 May 2024
Northern Command (USNORTHCOM)	1 October 2002	Peterson Space Force Base, Colorado	General; Gregory Guillot	USAF	5 February 2024
Southern Command (USSOUTHCOM)	6 June 1963	Doral, Florida^{‡}	General; Francis Donovan	USMC	5 February 2026
Space Command (USSPACECOM)	29 August 2019 (Note: The first U.S. Space Command was originally established as a unified combatant command in September 1985. It was disestablished in October 2002. The second U.S. Space Command, which is considered separate from the first, was established on 29 August 2019.)	Peterson Space Force Base, Colorado^{‡}	General; Stephen Whiting	USSF	10 January 2024
Functional combatant commands
Cyber Command (USCYBERCOM)	4 May 2018 (Note: U.S. Cyber Command was established on 23 June 2009, as a sub-unified command under U.S. Strategic Command. It separated from U.S. Strategic Command and was elevated to full unified command status on 4 May 2018.)	Fort George G. Meade, Maryland	General; Joshua Rudd	USA	10 March 2026
Special Operations Command (USSOCOM)	16 April 1987	MacDill Air Force Base, Florida	Admiral; Frank M. Bradley	USN	3 October 2025
Strategic Command (USSTRATCOM)	1 June 1992	Offutt Air Force Base, Nebraska	Admiral; Richard A. Correll	USN	5 December 2025
Transportation Command (USTRANSCOM)	1 July 1987	Scott Air Force Base, Illinois	General; Randall Reed	USAF	4 October 2024

^{‡} Currently, four geographic combatant commands have their headquarters located outside their geographic area of responsibility.

== History ==
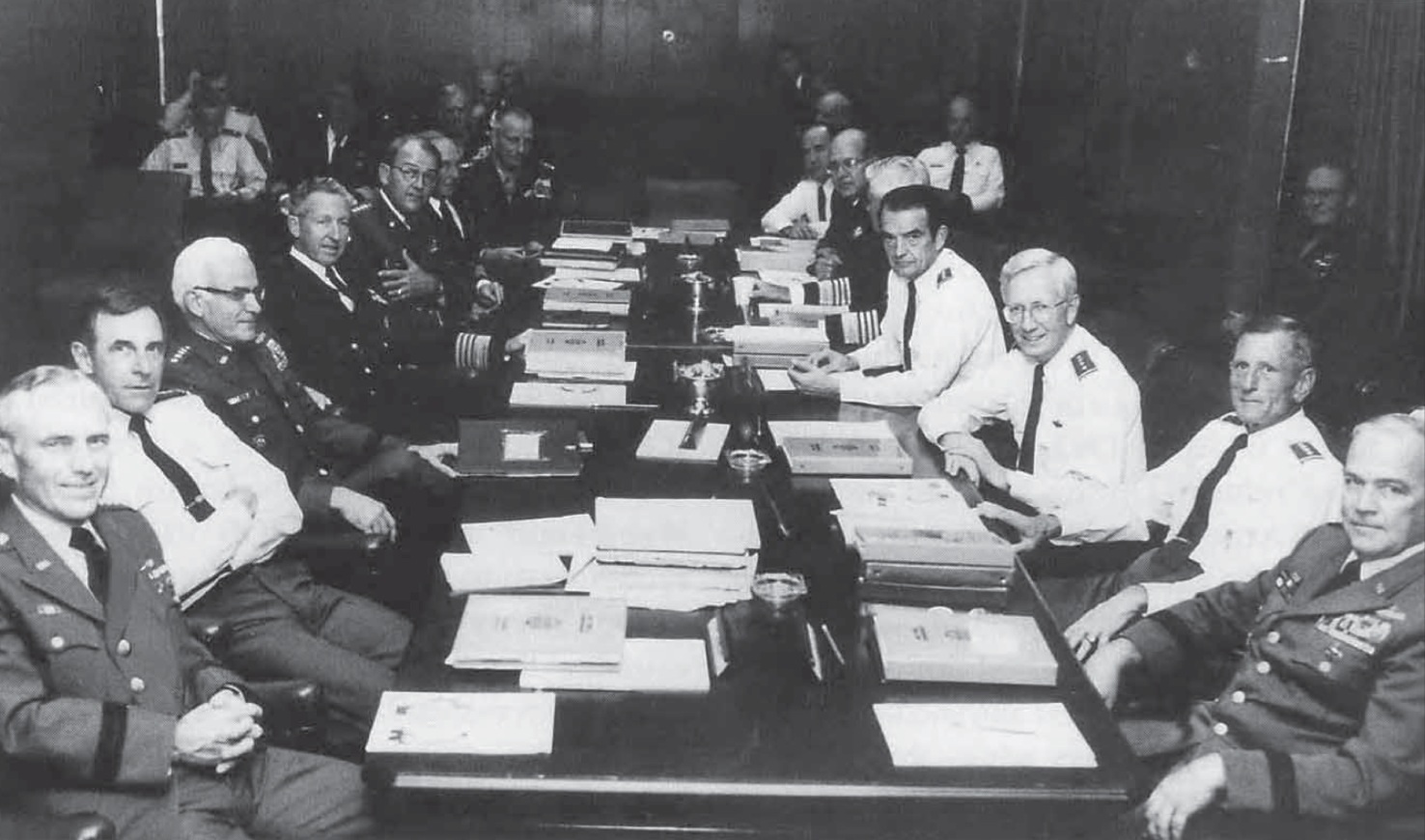
Commanders of unified and specified combatant command during an annual meeting with the Chairman of the Joint Chiefs of Staff and members of the Joint Chiefs of Staff at The Pentagon, Joint Chiefs of Staff Room (also known as "The Tank") on 15 January 1981.

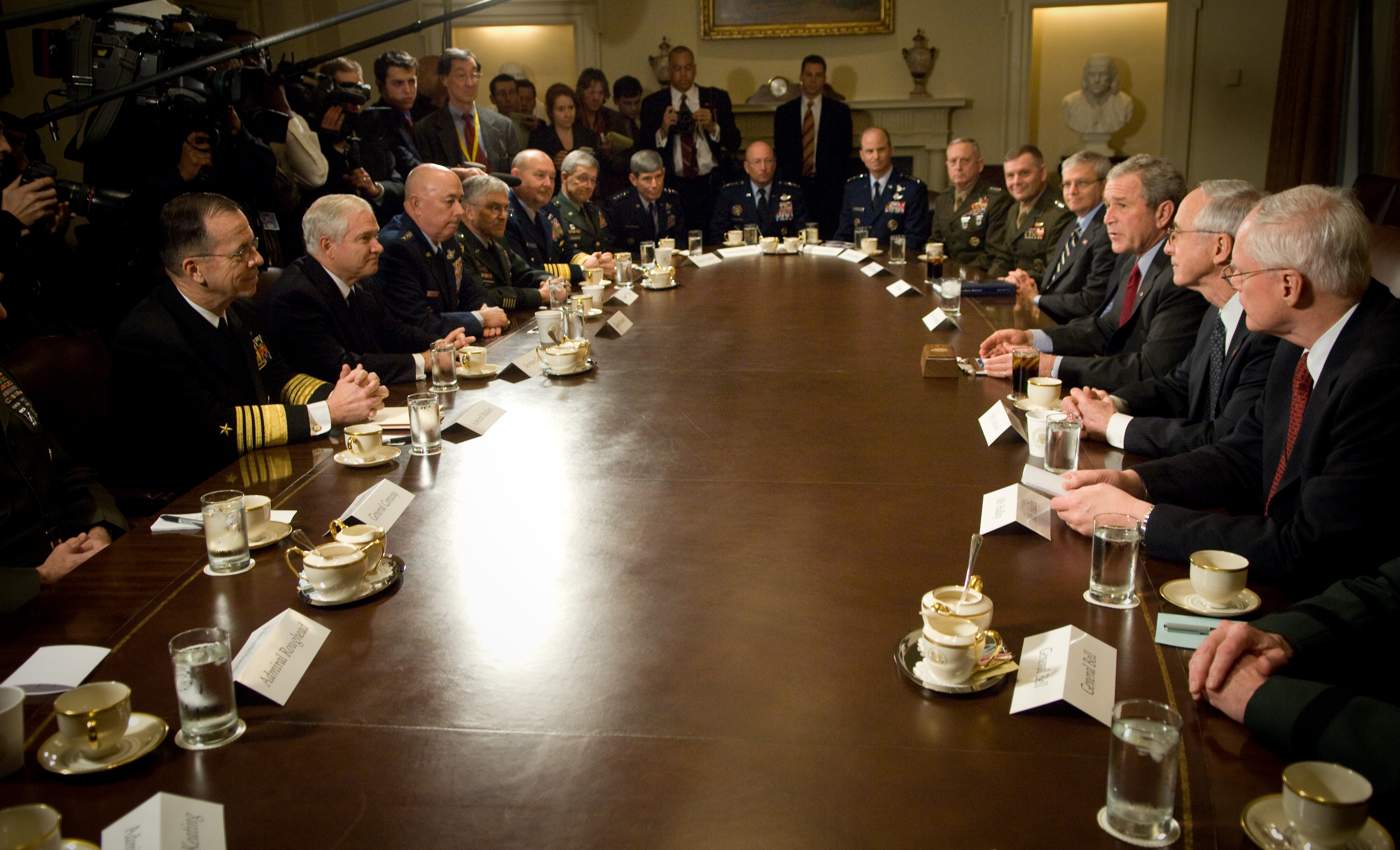
President George W. Bush (sitting third from the right) and Secretary of Defense Robert Gates (sitting second from the left) meeting with the joint chiefs and combatant commanders

The current system of unified commands in the U.S. military emerged during World War II with the establishment of geographic theaters of operation composed of forces from multiple service branches that reported to a single commander who was supported by a joint staff. A unified command structure also existed to coordinate British and U.S. military forces operating under the Combined Chiefs of Staff, which was composed of the British Chiefs of Staff Committee and the U.S. Joint Chiefs of Staff.

=== World War II and afterwards ===
In mainland Europe, Allied forces fell under the command of the Supreme Headquarters Allied Expeditionary Force (SHAEF). There was a separate command for the Mediterranean area. After SHAEF was dissolved at the end of the war, American forces were unified under a single command, the US Forces, European Territory (USFET), commanded by General of the Army Dwight D. Eisenhower. In the Pacific, the split in the location of base areas (the Philippines and then Australia, versus Hawaii and the U.S. West Coast), General Douglas MacArthur's towering ego, and Army-Navy rivalries meant that two separate commands were created.

The Joint Chiefs of Staff continued to advocate for permanent unified commands, and President Harry S. Truman approved the first plan on 14 December 1946. Known as the "Outline Command Plan", it would become the first in a series of Unified Command Plans. The original 1946 plan established seven unified commands: Far East Command, Pacific Command, Alaskan Command, Northeast Command, the U.S. Atlantic Fleet, United States Caribbean Command, and European Command. However, on 5 August 1947, the CNO recommended instead that CINCLANTFLT be established as a fully unified commander under the broader title of Commander in Chief, Atlantic (CINCLANT). The Army and Air Force objected, and CINCLANTFLT was activated as a unified command on 1 November 1947. A few days later, the CNO renewed his suggestion for the establishment of a unified Atlantic Command. This time, his colleagues withdrew their objections, and on 1 December 1947, the U.S. Atlantic Command (LANTCOM) was created under the Commander in Chief, Atlantic (CINCLANT).

Under the original plan, each of the unified commands operated with one of the service chiefs (the Chief of Staff of the Army or Air Force, or the Chief of Naval Operations) serving as an executive agent representing the Joint Chiefs of Staff. This arrangement was formalized on 21 April 1948, as part of a policy paper titled the "Function of the Armed Forces and the Joint Chiefs of Staff" (informally known as the "Key West Agreement"). The responsibilities of the unified commands were further expanded on 7 September 1948, when the commanders' authority was extended to include the coordination of the administrative and logistical functions in addition to their combat responsibilities.

=== Cold War era ===
Far East Command and U.S. Northeast Command were disestablished under the Unified Command Plan of 1956–1957. A 1958 "reorganization in National Command Authority relations with the joint commands" with a "direct channel" to unified commands such as Continental Air Defense Command (CONAD) was effected after President Dwight Eisenhower expressed concern about nuclear command and control. CONAD itself was disestablished in 1975.

United States Central Command was established in 1983, an upgrading of the three-star Rapid Deployment Joint Task Force.

Although not part of the original plan, the Joint Chiefs of Staff also created specified commands that had broad and continuing missions but were composed of forces from only one service. Examples include the U.S. Naval Forces, Eastern Atlantic and Mediterranean, and the U.S. Air Force's Strategic Air Command. Like the unified commands, the specified commands reported directly to the JCS instead of their respective service chiefs. These commands have not existed since the Strategic Air Command was disestablished in 1992. The relevant section of federal law, however, remains unchanged, and the President retains the power to establish a new specified command.

The Goldwater–Nichols Defense Reorganization Act of 1986 clarified and codified responsibilities that commanders-in-chief (CINCs) undertook, and which were first given legal status in 1947. After that act, CINCs reported directly to the United States Secretary of Defense, and through him to the President of the United States.

=== Post Soviet era ===
Then-Secretary of Defense Dick Cheney announced in 1993 that the command system should continue to evolve toward a joint global structure. Atlantic Command became the Joint Forces Command in the 1990s after the Soviet threat to the North Atlantic had disappeared and the need rose for an integrating and experimentation command for forces in the continental United States.

In 1997, the former Soviet Central Asian republics were assigned to CENTCOM. In January 2002 the area of the Russian Federation remained unassigned. The following month, the Secretary approved General Myers' recommendation that assigned Russia to EUCOM with PACOM in support of the Russian Far East. By mid-2002, for the first time, the entire surface of the earth was divided among the geographic commands. Rumsfeld assigned the last unassigned region—Antarctica—to PACOM, which stretched from Pole to Pole and covered half of the globe.

On 24 October 2002, Secretary of Defense Donald H. Rumsfeld announced that in accordance with Title 10 of the United States Code, the title of "Commander-in-Chief" would thereafter be reserved for the President, consistent with the terms of Article II of the United States Constitution. Thereafter, the military CINCs would be known as "combatant commanders", as heads of the unified combatant commands. A sixth geographical unified command, United States Africa Command (USAFRICOM), was approved and established in 2007 for Africa. It operated under U.S. European Command as a sub-unified command during its first year, and transitioned to independent Unified Command Status in October 2008. In 2009, it focused on synchronizing hundreds of activities inherited from three regional commands that previously coordinated U.S. military relations in Africa. Joint Forces Command was disbanded on 3 August 2011, and its components were placed under the Joint Staff and other combatant commands.

President Donald Trump announced on 18 August 2017, that the United States Cyber Command (USCYBERCOM) would be elevated to the status of a unified combatant command from a sub-unified command. It was also announced that the separation of the command from the NSA would be considered. USCYBERCOM was elevated on 4 May 2018.

Vice President Mike Pence announced on 18 December 2018, that President Donald Trump had issued a memorandum ordering the stand-up of a United States Space Command (USSPACECOM). A previous unified combatant command for unified space operations was decommissioned in 2002. The new USSPACECOM will include "(1) all the general responsibilities of a Unified Combatant Command; (2) the space-related responsibilities previously assigned to the Commander, United States Strategic Command; and (3) the responsibilities of Joint Force Provider and Joint Force Trainer for Space Operations Forces". USSPACECOM was re-established on 29 August 2019.

In a September 30, 2026 address at Marine Corps Base Quantico, Virginia, Secretary of Defense Pete Hegseth announced the creation of the Autonomous Warfare Command command, intended to lead the employment of unmanned and autonomous weapons, robots, and artificial intelligence systems of the United States Armed Forces. The new command is slated to have "service-like authorities", and be established as a four-star functional combatant command by October 1, 2027. The Direct Reporting Portfolio Manager for Unmanned Systems (DRPM-UxS) is leading the transitional organization under the new name Project Agincourt.

== Combatant commanders ==
Each combatant command (CCMD) is headed by a four-star general or admiral (the CCDR) recommended by the secretary of defense, nominated for appointment by the president of the United States, confirmed by the Senate, and commissioned, at the president's order, by the secretary of defense. The Goldwater–Nichols Act and its subsequent implementation legislation also resulted in specific Joint Professional Military Education (JPME) requirements for officers before they could attain flag or general officer rank, thereby preparing them for duty in Joint assignments such as UCC staff or Joint Chiefs of Staff assignments, which are strictly controlled tour length rotations of duty. However, in the decades following the enactment of Goldwater–Nichols, these JPME requirements have yet to come to fruition. This is particularly true in the case of senior naval officers, where sea duty/shore duty rotations and the culture of the naval service have often discounted PME and JPME as a measure of professional development for success. Although slowly changing, the JPME requirement continues to be frequently waived in the case of senior admirals nominated for these positions.

The operational chain of command runs from the president to the Secretary of Defense to the combatant commanders of the combatant commands. The chairman of the Joint Chiefs of Staff may transmit communications to the commanders of the combatant commands from the president and secretary of defense and advises both on potential courses of action, but the Chairman does not exercise military command over any combatant forces. Under Goldwater–Nichols, the service chiefs (also four stars in rank) are charged with the responsibility of the strategic direction; unified operation of combatant commands; and the integration of all land, naval, and air forces in an efficient "unified combatant command" force. Furthermore, the secretaries of the military departments (i.e., secretary of the Army, secretary of the Navy, and the secretary of the Air Force) are legally responsible to "organize, train and equip" combatant forces and, as directed by the secretary of defense, assign their forces for use by the combatant commands. The secretaries of the Military Departments thus exercise administrative control (ADCON) rather than operational control (OPCON—the prerogative of the combatant commander) over their forces.

=== Sub-unified commands ===
A sub-unified command, or subordinate unified command, may be established by combatant commanders when authorized to do so by the Secretary of Defense or the president. They are created to conduct a portion of the mission or tasking of their parent geographic or functional command. Sub-unified commands may be either functional or geographic, and the commanders of sub-unified commands exercise authority similar to that of combatant commanders. Examples of former and present sub-unified commands are the Alaskan Command (ALCOM) under USNORTHCOM, the United States Forces Korea (USFK) and United States Forces Japan (USFJ) under USINDOPACOM, and United States Forces—Afghanistan (USFA) under USCENTCOM.

== See also ==
- United States Air Force
- United States Army
- United States Coast Guard
- United States Marine Corps
- United States Navy state
- United States Space Force
