= Gregg F. Martin =

US Army general

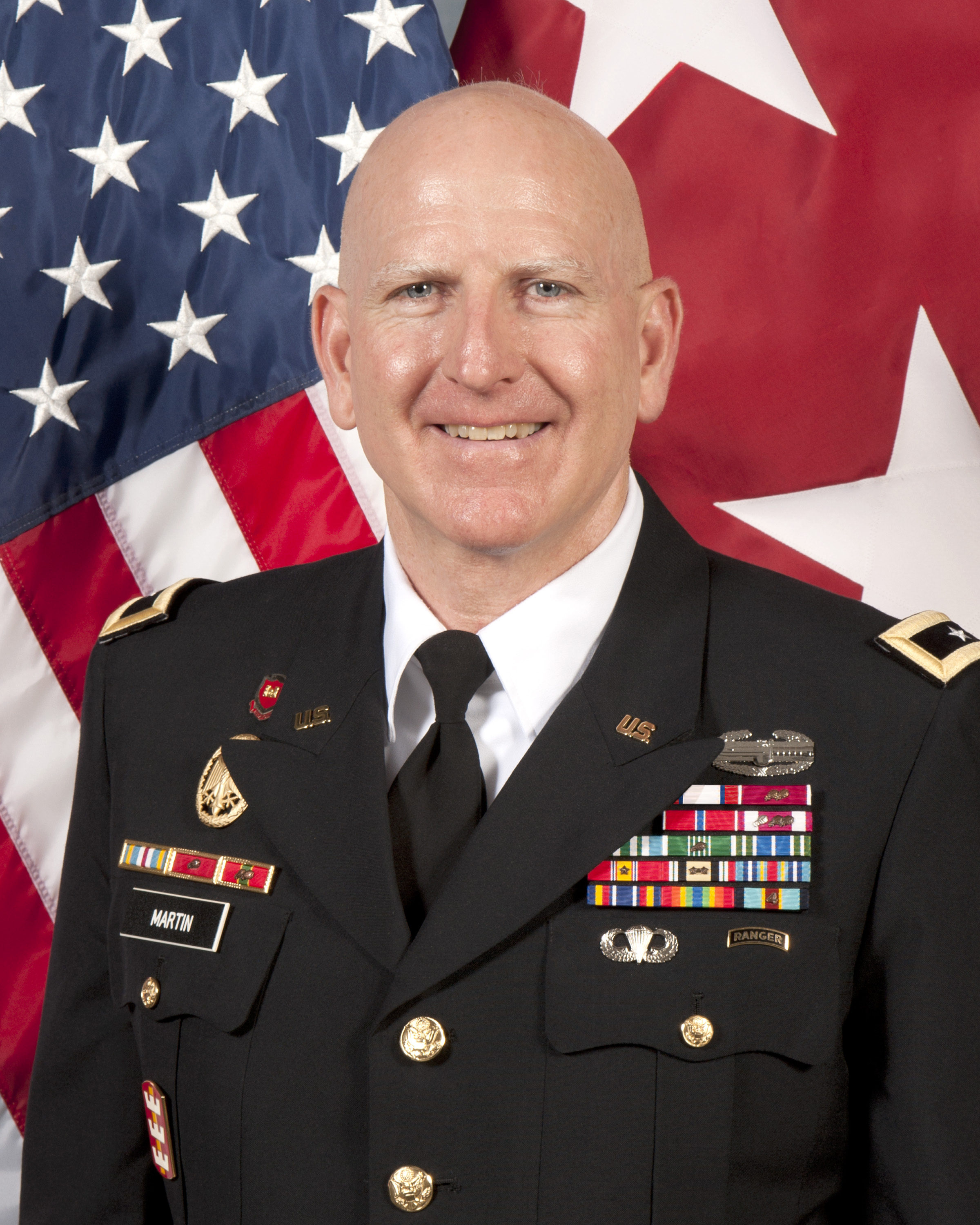
- Portrait of MG Martin, 2012
- Born: Gregg Forrest Martin; July 16, 1956 (age 70)
- Allegiance: United States
- Branch: United States Army
- Service years: 1979–2014
- Rank: Major general
- Education: U.S. Military Academy (BS); Massachusetts Institute of Technology (MS, PhD)
- Spouse: Maggie Ryan
- Children: 3

Gregg Forrest Martin (born July 16, 1956) is a United States Army two-star general who retired as the special assistant to the chief of engineers in 2014. From July 2012 to July 2014 he was the president of the National Defense University at Fort McNair Army Base in Washington, D.C., and from July 2010 to July 2012 he served as the commandant of the U.S. Army War College in Carlisle, Pennsylvania. He served as second in command for 3rd Army/US Army Central in the Central Command Area of Responsibility, including support operations in Iraq and Afghanistan, and across the CENTCOM region from January 2010 to April 2010. He led a complex enterprise of four major schools that educated, trained and developed thousands of soldiers, marines, airmen, sailors and civilians for leadership roles in global operations as the Commanding General at the Maneuver Support Center of Excellence in Fort Leonard Wood, Missouri from October 2008 to January 2010.

After retiring from the military, Martin revealed that he is a survivor of bipolar disorder, in an effort to reduce the stigma of that condition.

== Early life ==
The son of a World War II sailor and native New Englander, Martin graduated from Holbrook High School in Holbrook, Massachusetts in 1974, and was an Army ROTC walk-on at the University of Maine. He graduated from West Point in 1979 and was commissioned as an Army engineer.

He married Maggie Ryan and has a family of three sons: Philip, Conor, and Pat.

== Education ==
Martin graduated from the West Point, U.S. Military Academy (USMA), in 1979. He earned a Master of Science in Civil Engineering and Technology Policy from Massachusetts Institute of Technology in 1988, and a Doctor of Philosophy in Engineering and Public Policy in 1992.

== Service career ==
As a career engineer officer of 20 years in the US Army, Martin served at Fort Belvoir, Fort Benning, Germany, Fort Lewis, Honduras, and Fort Leonard Wood, as a combat and construction engineer.

He first attended the Engineer Officer basic and advanced courses at Fort Belvoir, continued his training at Ranger and Airborne School in Fort Benning, and began his career serving on the front lines of the Cold War in 1979 as platoon leader, company commander, and project engineer in Germany, defending the free world from the Soviet Union. After his six-year tour in Germany, Martin continued his service at Fort Lewis as an engineer staff officer with I Corps and the 864th Engineer Battalion. This was followed by a year of service in Honduras as the engineer staff officer for the Joint Task Force Bravo, and a two-year tour as a commander of the 5th Engineer Battalion at Fort Leonard Wood, Missouri.

From January 1995 to June 1997, Martin served as the instructor and course director of the Department of Social Sciences at West Point, where he taught and developed courses on American politics, international relations, and the politics of defense policy. From June 2000 to June 2002, he was the instructor and course director of Senior Leadership and Command Instruction at the US Army War College in Carlisle, Pennsylvania.

From 2002 to June 2004, Martin served as the commander of the 130th Engineer Brigade. He trained and deployed a three-battalion, 1700-soldier brigade from Germany to Kuwait, where the force joined the attack of Iraq, as an essential element of the initial assault on Baghdad. The brigade received American and Allied units from around the world, and expanded to more than 20 battalions and 13,000 troops, conducting full-spectrum engineer operations across the breadth and depth of Iraq from 2003 to 2004.

Martin continued his service as the deputy G3/5/7 of US Army Europe and 7th Army coordinating operations, planning, training, and international activities for US Army forces in Europe, Africa, and the Middle East (deployed force into Iraq and Afghanistan). From July 2005 to October 2007, he served as the U.S. Army Corps of Engineers, as Northwestern Division commander and division engineer of a $2 billion program encompassing military construction, civil works, and environmental and disaster preparedness over a 14-state region.

Martin was a presidential appointee on the Mississippi River Commission, and also took part in support efforts for Hurricane Katrina.

He led a complex enterprise of four major schools that educated, trained and developed thousands of soldiers, marines, airmen, sailors and civilians for leadership roles in global operations as the commanding general at the Maneuver Support Center of Excellence in Fort Leonard Wood, Missouri from October 2008 to January 2010. He served as second in command for 3rd Army/US Army Central in the Central Command Area of Responsibility, including support operations in Iraq and Afghanistan, and across the CENTCOM region, from January 2010 to April 2010.

From July 2010 to June 2012, Martin presided as the commandant of the US Army War College in Carlisle, Pennsylvania. He was the president of the National Defense University from July 2012 to July 2014. He retired as the special assistant to the chief of engineers (major general, US Army Corps of Engineers) working towards the Corps' 2025 Future Posture, emphasizing national infrastructure development, optimizing value for Federal engineering and facilities construction.

== Mental health advocacy ==
Martin has become a prominent advocate for mental health awareness, drawing on his personal experiences with bipolar disorder to shed light on the challenges faced by individuals with the condition. After a distinguished 36-year career in the United States Army, his journey with undiagnosed mental illness culminated in a public battle that he has since turned into a platform for advocacy and education.

His book, Bipolar General: My Forever War with Mental Illness, provides an unvarnished account of his experiences, offering insights into the intersection of mental health and military service. The memoir shares Martin's story of resilience and perseverance, detailing his life as a combat engineer and two-star general while coping with and overcoming the challenges of bipolar disorder. His efforts have been noted in various articles and interviews, in which he openly discusses the impact of mental illness on his life and career.

In a 2022 Florida Today article, Martin recalls the day he was asked to resign from his post prior to his bipolar diagnosis, a moment that highlights the often unseen struggles of mental health in high-pressure environments. His story continues to be a testament to the complexities of mental health in the armed forces. The AUSA event focused on his book and his experiences, providing a platform for dialogue and understanding about mental health issues in the military community. Through his public discourse, he aims to inspire change, understanding, and provide support to others facing similar battles.

Martin's advocacy transcends his military accolades, positioning him as a pivotal figure in the conversation on mental health. His contributions to raising awareness and supporting others with bipolar disorder underscore his commitment to service, both in uniform and beyond.

Military offices
Preceded by Robert M. Williams	Commandant of the Army War College; 2010–2012	Succeeded by Tony Cucolo
Preceded by Ann E. Rondeau	President of the National Defense University; 2012–2014	Succeeded by Frederick M. Padilla
