= College of Information and Cyberspace =

U.S. Department of Defense graduate school

NDU College of Information & Cyberspace
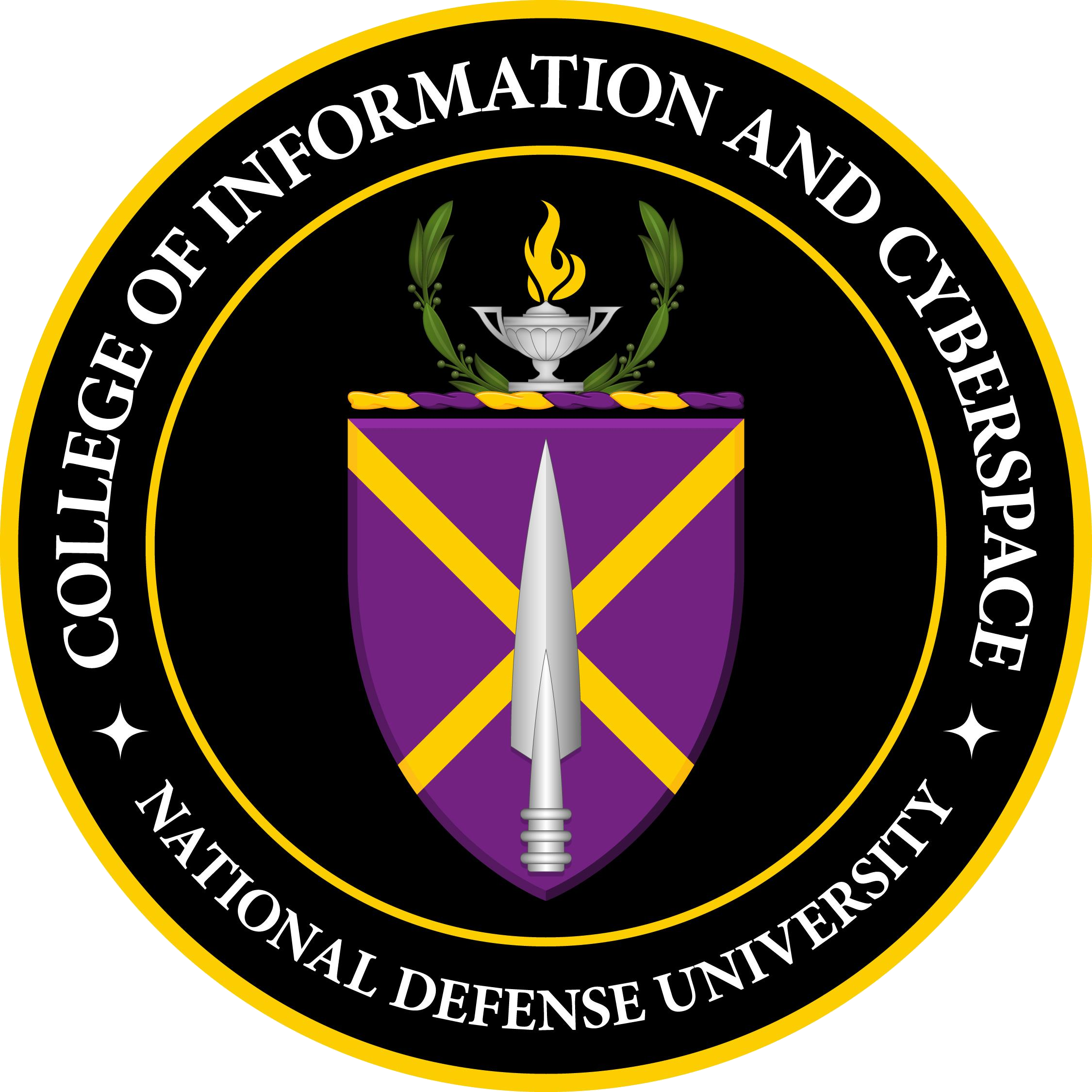
- Type: Government institution
- Established: 1964 (originally the DoD Computer Institute)
- Chancellor: Ms. Elizabeth M. Phu
- Faculty: 27
- Postgraduates: ~1900
- Location: Washington, D.C.
- Campus: Fort Lesley J. McNair
- Colors: █ Purple █ Gold █ Black
- Website: http://cic.ndu.edu/

The National Defense University College of Information and Cyberspace (CIC) (formerly the Information Resources Management College (IRMC) or NDU iCollege, and the DoD Computer Institute) is a U.S. Department of Defense graduate school that provides information and cyberspace focused education for national security leaders of the United States and beyond. A component of the National Defense University (NDU), it is located at Fort McNair, Washington, D.C. NDU CIC is recognized for its excellent graduate-level programs, faculty, and services that provide a strategic advantage for today’s military and civilian leaders in the Department of Defense and across government. The NDU CIC's chancellor provides strategic direction and vision for all faculty, staff, and students.

== History ==
In 1976, the Industrial College of the Armed Forces and the National War College were brought into one joint educational institution when the National Defense University became a historic pooling of the defense community's intellectual resources. They were joined in 1981 by the Joint Forces Staff College (JFSC) and in 1982 by the Department of Defense Computer Institute (DODCI). DODCI was established originally in 1964. In 1988, DODCI was re-established and changed to the Information Resources Management College (IRMC) and then was rebranded as the iCollege in 2008. Over the last 25+ years, the NDU CIC has expanded its programs and offerings for all of government and has developed robust online and in-person academic programs. The 2017 renaming to the current College of Information and Cyberspace (CIC) reflects the evolving understanding and employment of information as a Joint warfighting function and cyberspace as its own warfighting domain.

Notable people associated with CIC include Admiral Grace Hopper (who served as an instructor and advocate of the school), the current Acting DoD CISO Mr. Mark Hakun (a graduate of the CIC's CISO program), and former Deputy Assistant Secretary of Defense (DASD) for Cyber Policy Thomas Wingfield (who served as a Dean and Acting Chancellor of CIC).
