= College of International Security Affairs =

College at the National Defense University

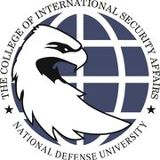
- Type: Government institution
- Established: 2002 (as the School for National Security Executive Education)
- Chancellor: Greta C. Holtz
- Location: Washington, D.C.
- Campus: Fort Lesley J. McNair
- Website: https://cisa.ndu.edu/

The College of International Security Affairs (CISA), formerly known as the School for National Security Executive Education (SNSEE), is one of five colleges at the National Defense University. It is considered the flagship U.S. Department of Defense institution for education in combating terrorism and irregular warfare at the strategic level. According to a Joint Chief of Staff document, the mission of CISA is to "educate joint warfighters and national security leaders in creative and critical thinking for the strategic challenges of winning strategies for the contemporary security environment".

CISA offers a Master of Arts in Strategic Security Studies and two certificate programs. It also offers a Joint Special Operations Master of Arts Program at Fort Bragg in partnership with the U.S. Army John F. Kennedy Special Warfare Center and School.

== History ==
In 2003, the School for National Security Executive Education (SNSEE) began offering an International Counterterrorism Fellowship certificate. That same year, SNSEE was designated as the flagship of the U.S. government's Combating Terrorism Fellowship Program (CTFP), receiving 10 students in its inaugural class. The program was later expanded into a Master of Arts in Strategic Security Studies.

CISA figures from the 2022–2023 academic year showed that out of the 69 students on its main Fort McNair campus, 58% were overseas fellows.

In 2010, CISA established an additional location at Fort Bragg, North Carolina, and developed the Joint Special Operations Master of Arts Program in partnership with the U.S. Army. The first graduating class at Ft. Bragg consisted of 20 special operators.

On June 25, 2014, the Joint Staff Joint Force Development J-7 granted the College of International Security Affairs authority to award Joint Professional Military Education (JPME II) credit.
