= Goldwater–Nichols Act =

1986 U.S. law strengthening civilian authority in the Department of Defense

Goldwater–Nichols Department of Defense Reorganization Act of 1986
- Long title: An Act To reorganize the Department of Defense and strengthen civilian authority in the Department of Defense, to improve the military advice provided to the President, the National Security Council, and the Secretary of Defense, to place clear responsibility on the commanders of the unified and specified combatant commands for the accomplishment of missions assigned to those commands and ensure that the authority of those commanders is fully commensurate with that responsibility, to increase attention to the formulation of strategy and to contingency planning, to provide for more efficient use of defense resources, to improve joint officer management policies, otherwise to enhance the effectiveness of military operations and improve the management and administration of the Department of Defense, and for other purposes.
- Enacted by: the 99th United States Congress

Citations
- Public law: 99-433
- Statutes at Large: 100 Stat. 992

Legislative history
- Introduced in the House as H.R. 3622 by Bill Nichols (D–AL) on October 24, 1985; Committee consideration by United States House Committee on Armed Services; Passed the House on November 20, 1985 (383–27); Passed the Senate on May 5, 1986 (95–0); Signed into law by President Ronald Reagan on October 1, 1986

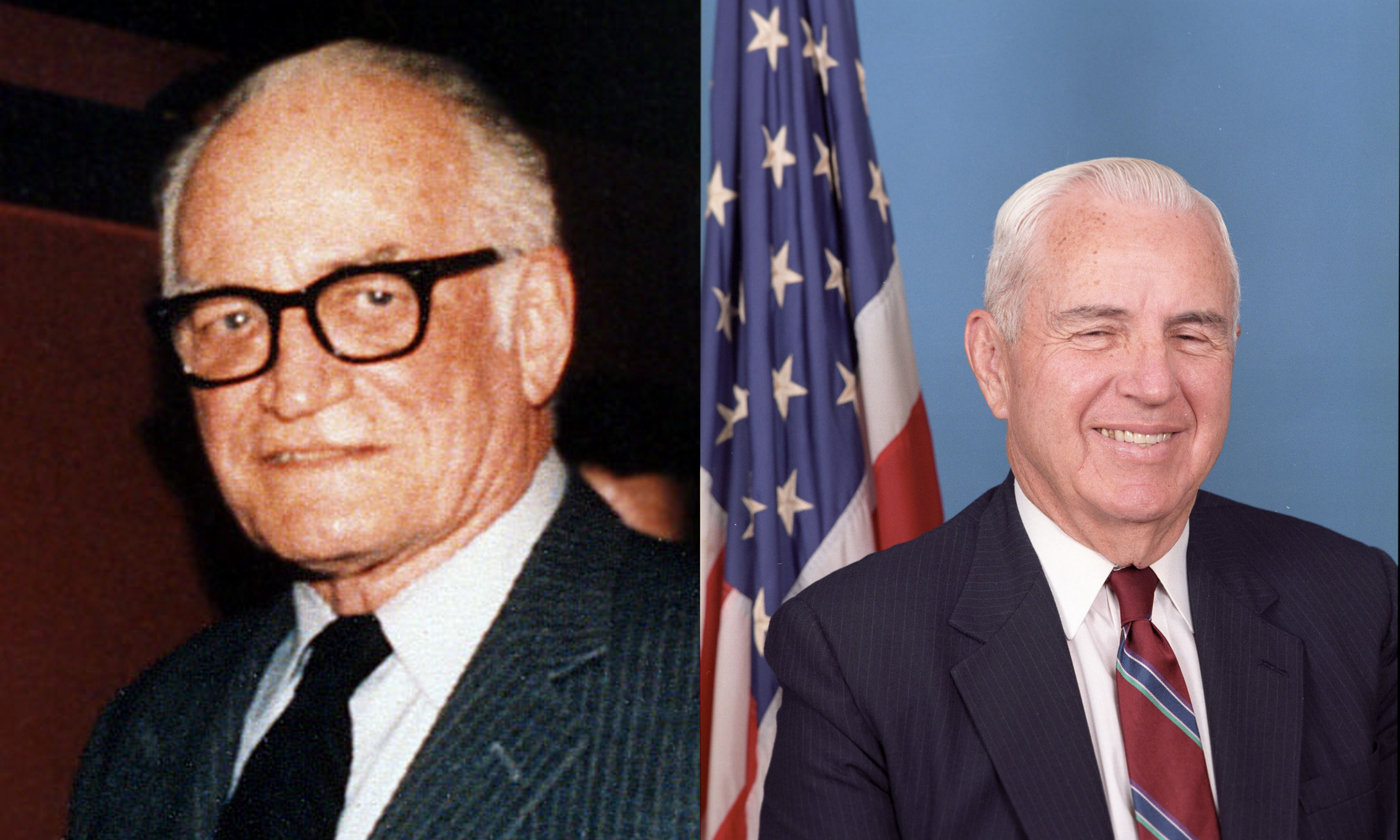
Sen. Barry Goldwater (R—AZ) and Rep. Bill Nichols (D—AL-4), the co-sponsors of the Goldwater–Nichols Act of 1986

The Goldwater–Nichols Department of Defense Reorganization Act of October 4, 1986 (Pub. L. 99–433; signed by President Ronald Reagan) made the most sweeping changes to the United States Department of Defense since the department was established in the National Security Act of 1947 by reworking the command structure of the U.S. military. It increased the powers of the chairman of the Joint Chiefs of Staff and implemented some of the suggestions from the Packard Commission, commissioned by President Reagan in 1985. Among other changes, Goldwater–Nichols streamlined the military chain of command, which now runs from the president through the secretary of defense directly to combatant commanders (CCDRs, all four-star generals or admirals), bypassing the service chiefs. The service chiefs were assigned to an advisory role to the president and the secretary of defense, and given the responsibility for training and equipping personnel for the unified combatant commands.

Named after Senator Barry Goldwater (R-Arizona) and Representative Bill Nichols (D-Alabama), the bill passed the House of Representatives, 383–27, and the Senate, 95–0. It was signed into law by President Reagan on October 1, 1986. Admiral William J. Crowe was the first chairman to serve under this new legislation.

== History ==
The Goldwater–Nichols Act was an attempt to fix problems caused by inter-service rivalry, which had emerged during the Vietnam War, contributed to the catastrophic failure of the Iranian hostage rescue mission in 1980, and which were still evident in the invasion of Grenada in 1983.

Such problems existed as well in World War II, during which two independent lines of command flowed from the president, one through the secretary of the Navy to naval forces, and the other through the secretary of war to land and air forces. In 1947, the military restructuring placed all military forces, including the newly independent Air Force, under a single civilian secretary of defense.

However, the United States military was still organized along the lines of command that reported to their respective service chiefs (Commandant of the Marine Corps, Chiefs of Staff of the Army and Air Force, and Chief of Naval Operations). These service chiefs in turn made up the Joint Chiefs of Staff. The Joint Chiefs of Staff elected a chairman to communicate with the civilian government. The chairman of the Joint Chiefs in turn reported to the secretary of defense, the civilian head of the military. Both the chairman of the Joint Chiefs and the secretary of defense reported to the president of the United States who holds the position of Commander-in-Chief (CINC) of all U.S. Armed Forces.

This system led to counter-productive inter-service rivalry. Peacetime activities (such as procurement and creation of doctrine, etc.) were tailored for each service in isolation. Additionally, wartime activities of each service were largely planned, executed, and evaluated independently. These practices resulted in division of effort and an inability to profit from economies of scale, and inhibited the development of modern warfare doctrine.

The formulation of the AirLand Battle doctrine in the late 1970s and early 1980s laid bare the difficulty of coordinating efforts among various service branches. AirLand Battle attempted to synthesize all of the capabilities of the service arms of the military into a single doctrine. The system envisioned ground, naval, air, and space based systems acting in concert to attack and defeat an opponent in depth. The structure of the armed forces effectively blocked realization of this ideal. The U.S. invasion of Grenada in 1983 further exposed the problems with the military command structure. Although the United States forces easily prevailed, its leaders expressed major concerns over different service branches' inability to coordinate and communicate with each other and the consequences of a lack of coordination if faced with a more threatening foe.

== Effects ==
The Goldwater–Nichols Act brought sweeping changes to the way the U.S. military forces were organized. The first successful test of Goldwater–Nichols was the 1989 United States invasion of Panama (code-named Operation Just Cause), where it functioned exactly as planned, allowing the U.S. commander, Army General Maxwell Reid Thurman, to exercise full control over Marine Corps, Army, Air Force and Navy assets without having to negotiate with the individual services.

=== Chain of command and military advice ===
Under the Goldwater–Nichols Act, military advice was centralized in the chairman of the Joint Chiefs of Staff as opposed to the service chiefs. The chairman was designated as the principal military adviser to the president of the United States, National Security Council and Secretary of Defense. The act also established the position of vice chairman of the Joint Chiefs of Staff and simplified the chain of command. Additionally, the act states that the chairman and vice chairman of the Joint Chiefs of Staff cannot be representatives from the same service branch. It increased the ability of the chairman to direct overall strategy, but provided greater command authority to "unified" and "specified" field commanders. According to the act, the chairman may not exercise military command over the Joint Chiefs of Staff or any of the armed forces.

Section 162(b) of the act prescribes that "unless otherwise directed by the president, the chain of command to a unified or specified combatant command runs—

1. "from the president to the secretary of defense," and
2. "from the secretary of defense to the commander of the combatant command".

=== Interaction of services ===
Goldwater–Nichols changed the way the services interact. The services themselves "organize, train and equip" forces for use by the combatant commanders (CCDRs), and the service chiefs no longer exercise any operational control over their forces. Rather than reporting to a service chief operationally, the service component forces support the commander responsible for a specific function (special operations, strategic, transportation, cyber) or a geographic region of the globe (Northern, Central, European, Pacific, Southern, Africa Commands), and Space. The combatant commanders then field a force capable of employing AirLand Battle doctrine (or its successors) using all assets available to the integrated unified action plan, including the military, interagency organizations of the US Government such as USAID and the Department of State, and intelligence agencies. The restructuring afforded a combination of effort, integrated planning, shared procurement, and a reduction or elimination of inter-service rivalry. It also provided unity of command, conforming with leading military science. Individual services changed from relatively autonomous war-fighting entities into organizational and training units, responsible for acquisition, modernization, force-development, and readiness as a component of the integrated force. Thus USCENTCOM (U.S. Central Command), for example, would be assigned air, ground, naval, Marine, space, and special operations assets to achieve its objectives, not the previously less efficient method of individual services planning, supporting, and fighting the same war. This was successfully demonstrated during Operation Desert Storm in 1991.

=== Personnel management of officers ===
Another major effect of the Act is the way it has dramatically changed the personnel management of military officers. Many officers are assigned to joint duty positions (occasionally more than once), and are educated in Department of Defense Joint Professional Military Education (JPME) schools as part of their career development and progression. For example, in order to be competitive for promotion to general or flag officer (admiral) (pay grade O-7 or above/NATO OF-6), active component colonels (pay grade O-6/NATO OF-5) (Army, Marine Corps, and Air Force) or Navy captains must have completed at least one joint duty assignment, as well as having completed (or currently be enrolled in) a JPME school that grants JPME Level II credit.

=== Shared procurement ===
Shared procurement allowed the various branches to share technological advances such as stealth and smart weapons quickly, and provided other ancillary benefits (such as improved interoperability of radios and communications between units and members of different services). Joint implementation of new technology allowed for joint development of supporting doctrine. The Goldwater–Nichols Act could be seen as the initial step of the currently ongoing Revolution in Military Affairs (RMA) with its concept of Network Centric Warfare (NCW).

== Changes since 1986 ==
On October 24, 2002, Secretary of Defense Donald Rumsfeld ordered that the functional and regional commanders be referred to not as "CINCs" but as "combatant commanders" when applied to "unified" regional organizations (e.g., USCENTCOM), or "commander" when talking about "specified" units such as the U.S. Strategic Command (USSTRATCOM). Rumsfeld said the term "CINC" was inappropriate, notwithstanding its employment for many decades, because under the United States Constitution, the president is the Nation's only Commander-in-Chief. His decision was described as intending to clarify and strengthen the military's subordination to civilian government.

On November 10, 2015, Senator John McCain announced at a hearing of the Senate Armed Services Committee, the beginning of a new effort to "reconsider, and possibly update" Goldwater–Nichols.

On January 4, 2016, the deputy secretary of defense issued a memorandum directing an internal review with the objective "to make recommendations for updates or adjustments to organizational relationships and authorities" based on 30 years of experience under Goldwater–Nichols.

On April 5, 2016, Defense Secretary Ash Carter outlined reforms in a speech at the Center for Strategic and International Studies.

== See also ==
- National Security Strategy (United States)
