= Dwight D. Eisenhower School for National Security and Resource Strategy =

U.S. military college for national security and resource strategy

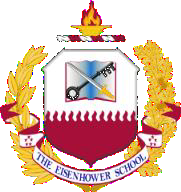
- Active: 1924–1941 (inactive for part of WWII); 1943–present
- Country: United States
- Branch: Multi-service
- Role: Senior-level Staff College
- Part of: National Defense University
- Garrison/HQ: Fort Lesley J. McNair
- Colors: Blue and White
- Mascot: "Claws-o-Witz"
- Website: es.ndu.edu

Commanders
- Commandant: Major General William H. Seely III, USMC

The Dwight D. Eisenhower School for National Security and Resource Strategy (Eisenhower School), formerly known as the Industrial College of the Armed Forces (ICAF), is a part of the National Defense University. It was renamed on September 6, 2012, in honor of Dwight D. Eisenhower who graduated from this school when it was previously known as the Army Industrial College.

The Eisenhower School is a United States military educational institution tasked with preparing selected military officers and civilians for senior national security leadership positions dealing with the resource component of national power. The college conducts postgraduate, executive-level courses of study, and associated research, awarding a Master of Science degree in national resource strategy to its graduates. Special emphasis is placed on materiel acquisition, joint logistics, and their integration into national security strategy.

== History ==
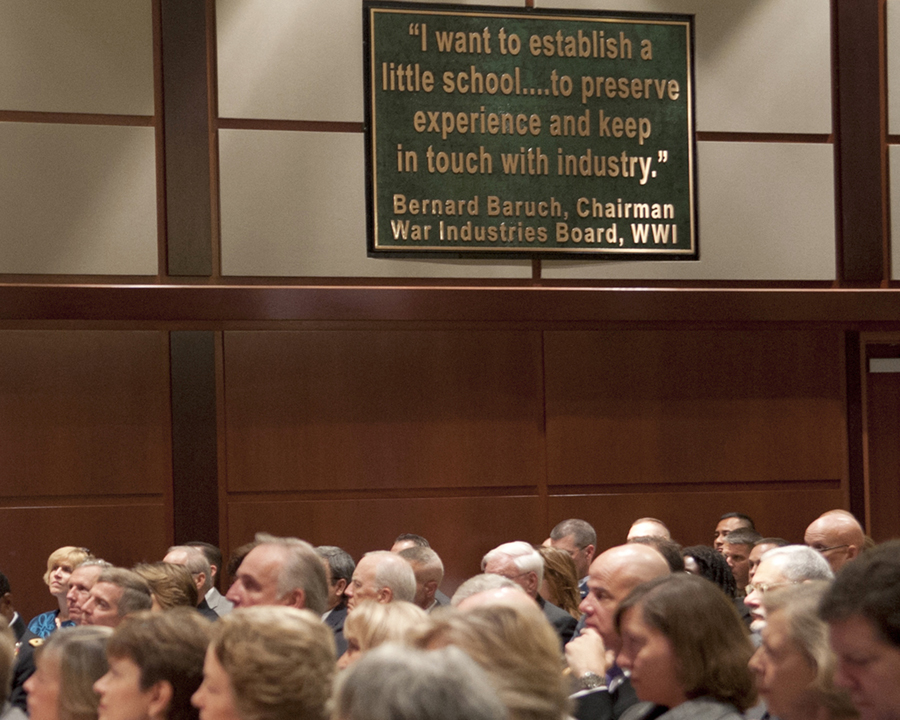
Bernard Baruch's quote in the auditorium of the school

The United States suffered severe mobilization difficulties during World War I. To minimize a recurrence, the Army Industrial College was established in 1924 to focus on wartime procurement and mobilization procedures. Bernard M. Baruch, a prominent Wall Street speculator and Chairman of the War Industries Board, is regarded as one of the founding fathers.

The first class at the Army Industrial College had only nine students, but by the early 1930s, the college was graduating 40 to 50 students in each class. During the first three years, the college provided a five-month course of study. In 1927, the program was expanded to ten-months with one graduating class each year. From 1930 to 1934, William A. McCain, a 1924 graduate, served as the college's director. Major Dwight D. Eisenhower graduated from the college in 1933 and later served on the faculty. In 1940, the colleges expanded to two classes and then graduated four classes in 1941. The college was closed in December 1941 after Japan's attack on Pearl Harbor to make officers available to support World War II. By that time approximately 1,000 officers had been trained at the college.

The college re-opened in December 1943. Before war's end senior Army officers, including General Eisenhower (who was then the Allied Supreme Commander of the European Theatre), supported the concept of a joint war college to study mobilization planning and military logistics. From 1944 to 1946, Donald Armstrong was commandant of the Army Industrial College. In 1946, the school's name was changed to the Industrial College of the Armed Forces. ICAF moved to Fort McNair, near the newly founded National War College. The Industrial College offered a ten-month academic program for selected high potential officers. In 1948, Secretary of Defense James V. Forrestal removed the college from the Army's jurisdiction and reconstituted it "as a joint educational institution under the direction of the Joint Chiefs of Staff."

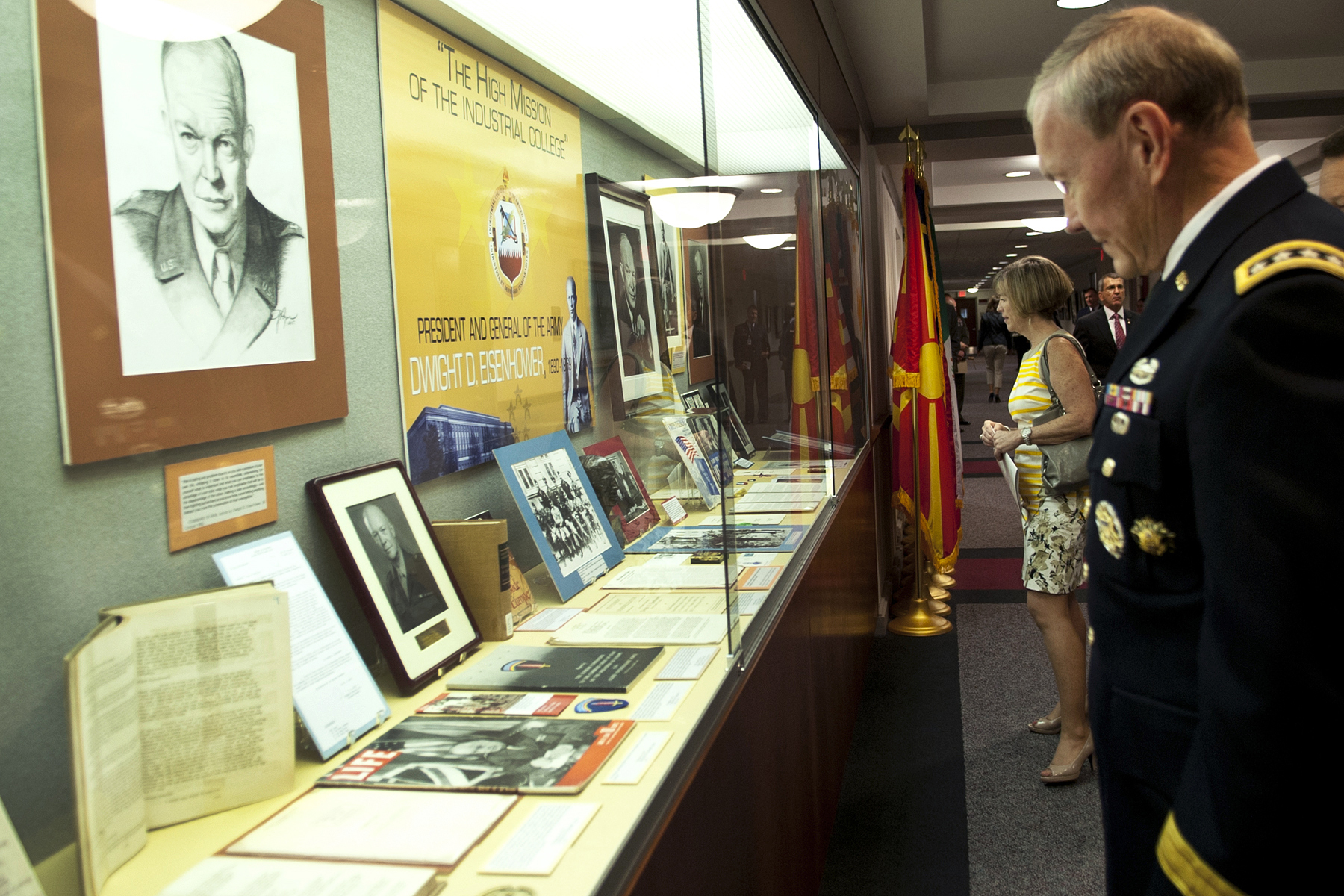
Display dedicated to alumnus Dwight D. Eisenhower

ICAF moved into a newly constructed facility, Eisenhower Hall, in 1960. During the next several years, the character of ICAF changed dramatically. As the United States found itself increasingly involved in the Vietnam War, ICAF shifted from focusing on national industrial mobilization to educating leaders to manage logistical resources in such conflicts. Student demographics changed, with the first woman and African American students graduated in 1973.

In 1976, ICAF became part of the newly established National Defense University. The Goldwater–Nichols Act called for substantially increased attention to joint military education. In response, the college expanded its curriculum, adding a joint operations module and a mandatory acquisition course. In 1991, the chairman of the Joint Chiefs of Staff gave ICAF responsibility for conducting a senior acquisition program military and civilian personnel from all the Services and Department of Defense agencies. The new senior acquisition program was offered in conjunction with the Defense Acquisition University.

In 1993, Congress passed legislation authorizing the Industrial College to award master's degree in national resource strategy. The graduating of the class of 1994 was the first to be awarded a master's degree.

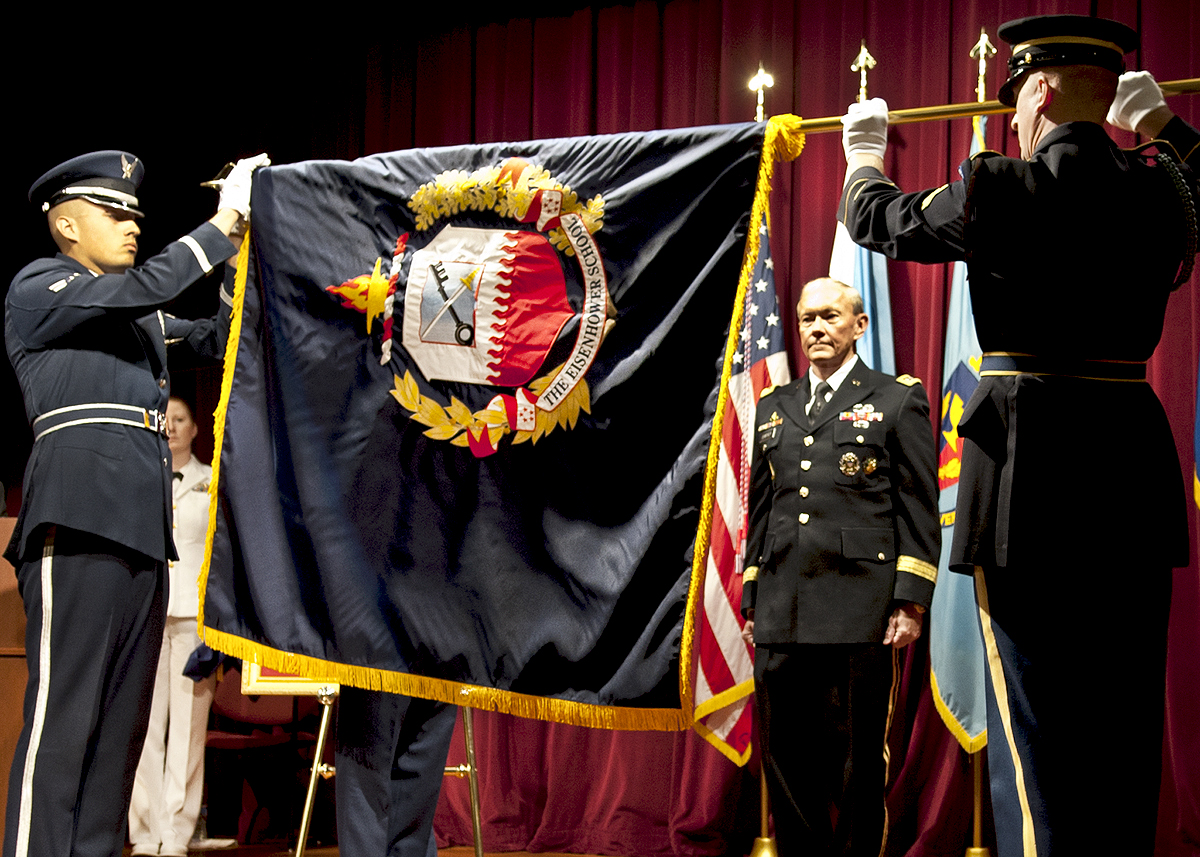
Unfurling of the new Eisenhower School flag in September 2012

In 2012, the college was renamed The Dwight D. Eisenhower School for National Security and Resource Strategy. It is now commonly known as The Eisenhower School. Today, the official mission of the college is to: "Prepare selected military officers and civilians for strategic leadership and success in developing our national security strategy and in evaluating, marshalling, and managing resources in the execution of that strategy."

== Faculty ==
The faculty is composed of civilian academics and highly qualified military officers from all the military Services. The military faculty members are normally Army and Air Force colonels along with Navy captains. Both the civilian and military faculty members are experts in the specific fields they teach. Civilian faculty members normally hold doctorate degrees (or equivalent professional degrees). The faculty includes representatives from the United States Department of State and other federal agencies. The faculty are grouped into four academic departments.

The college's academic departments are:

- Defense Strategy and Resourcing
- National Security and Economic Policy
- National Security and Industrial Base
- Strategic Leadership

== Students ==
The Eisenhower School educates 330 students on campus each academic year. The joint, interagency and international student body is composed of:

- Senior military officers from all services – 56 percent
- Departments of Defense and State and 10 other federal agencies – 34 percent
- International military officers – 8 percent
- Private sector – 2 percent

Students generally have approximately 20 years of experience in the military or civilian agencies and have proven themselves as very high-level performers at the operational level. In addition, The Eisenhower School has a number of International Fellows, and it is the only Senior Joint Professional Military Education (JPME) school with Industry Fellows (private sector).

== Curriculum ==
The college's curriculum focuses on the resource components of national security. Its academic program includes courses in national security studies, defense strategy, joint operations, leadership and communications, economics, military acquisition, and industry studies. The college's core curriculum is supplemented by elective courses, focuses research opportunities, and an industry studies program. The college is accredited by the Middle States Commission on Higher Education.

The curriculum includes an industry studies program that looks at the economic health of selected industrial sectors, both within the United States and globally. Students study and analyze how specific industries can be used to support national security during peacetime and war. The program includes field research. This is conducted during field trips to industry center across the United States and internationally. During these visits faculty and students meet with government officials, corporate executives, and labor leaders. Each industry seminar prepares a comprehensive report on its focus area. The reports are published at the end of the academic year.

The senior acquisition program is the capstone course for procurement professionals within the Department of Defense. This course of study prepares selected military officers and civilians for senior level positions in the department's acquisition organizations. The program consists of the college's normal ten-month curriculum plus two in-depth elective courses that address acquisition policy and issues. Students completing the program receive a diploma from Defense Acquisition University along with their master's degree.

== Alumni ==
For notable alumni, see: Category:Dwight D. Eisenhower School for National Security and Resource Strategy alumni
