= National Defense University (United States) =

Military university in Washington, D.C.

- Arms of the National Defense University
- Type: Federal staff college
- Established: 1976
- Parent institution: U.S. Department of Defense
- Academic affiliations: CUWMA
- President: VADM Peter Garvin
- Provost: James Lepse
- Location: Fort Lesley J. McNair, Washington, D.C., United States; 38°51′58″N 77°00′54″W
- Website: www.ndu.edu

The National Defense University (NDU) is an institution of higher education in Fort Lesley McNair, Washington, D.C., United States. It is funded by the United States Department of Defense aimed at facilitating high-level education, training, and professional development of national security leaders. As a chairman's Controlled Activity, NDU operates under the guidance of the chairman of the Joint Chiefs of Staff (CJCS), with Vice Admiral Peter Garvin, USN, as president. It is located near the White House and the US Congress.

== Components ==
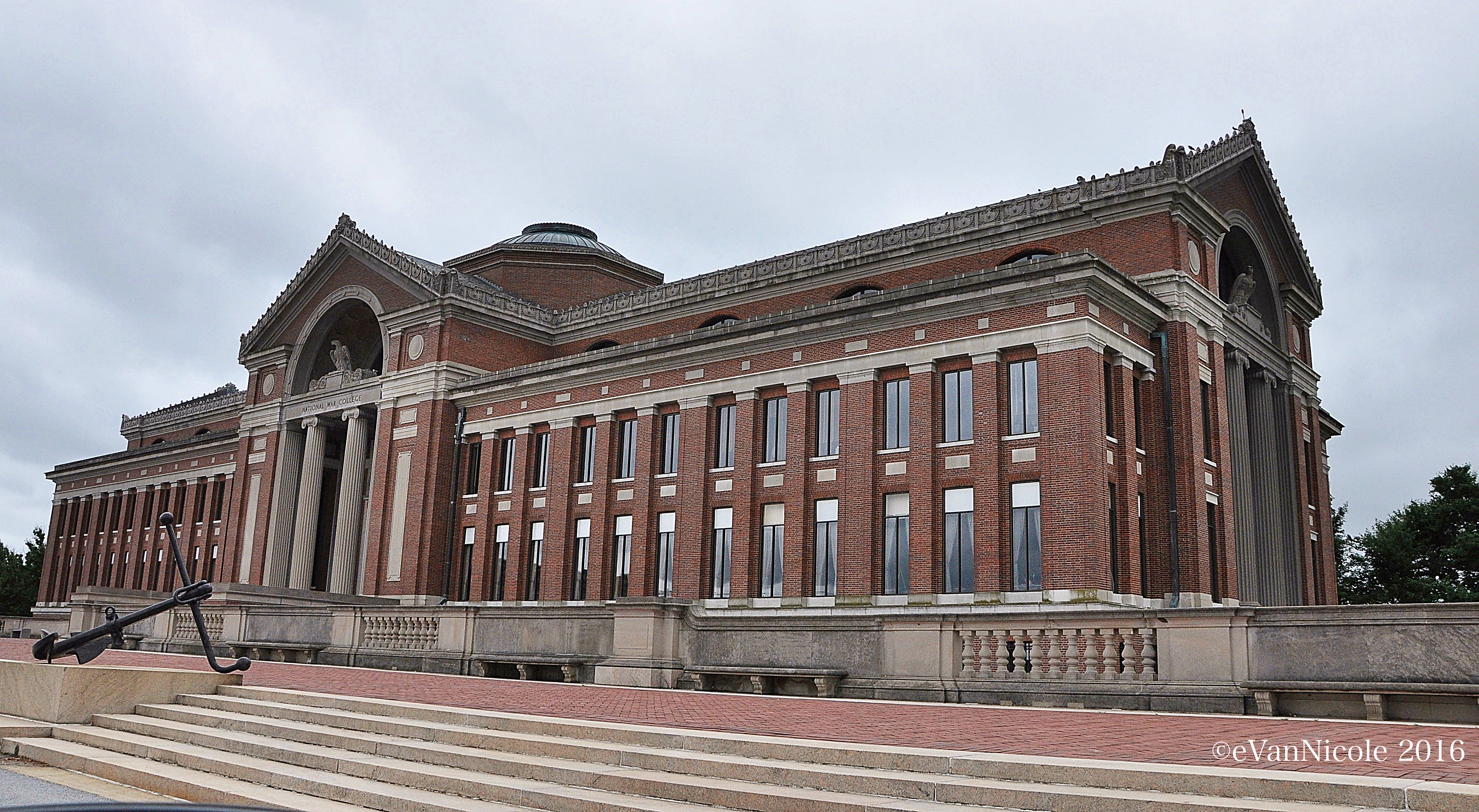
National War College, taken 2014

The National Defense University includes:

- Colleges and schools
  - National Intelligence University
  - College of International Security Affairs
  - Dwight D. Eisenhower School for National Security and Resource Strategy (The Eisenhower School), formerly the Industrial College of the Armed Forces
  - College of Information and Cyberspace (formerly Information Resources Management College or "iCollege")
  - Joint Forces Staff College
  - National War College
- Programs
  - CAPSTONE
  - KEYSTONE
  - PINNACLE
- Research centers
  - Institute for National Strategic Studies
    - Center for the Study of Chinese Military Affairs
    - Center for the Study of Weapons of Mass Destruction
    - NDU Press
  - Center for Applied Strategic Learning
- NDU Libraries

=== Acceptance rate and admissions ===
Acceptance rate	65%
Admissions requirements	Yes, based on entrance examinations and students' past academic records and grades
Academic calendar	Semesters
Enrollment	1,500
Full-time employees	75
Student:staff ratio	20:1

=== Research institutes and centers ===
- Institute for National Strategic Studies
- Center for Strategic Studies
- Center for the Study of Military Affairs of China
- Center for the Study of Weapons of Mass Destruction
- National Defense University Press
- Center for Applied Strategic Training
- Center for Joint and Strategic Logistics
- The university has a scientific and reference library, the resources of which are open to all students and teachers.

=== Associated organizations ===
- NDU Board of Visitors
- National Defense University Foundation
- United States Institute of Peace
- Consortium of Universities of the Washington Metropolitan Area

== Publications ==
The NDU Press supports education, research, and outreach as the university's cross-component, professional military, and academic publishing house. Publications include the journals Joint Force Quarterly (JFQ) and PRISM: The Journal of Complex Operations, books such as Strategic Assessment 2020, case studies, policy briefs, and strategic monographs.

== List of presidents ==
No.	President		Term			Service branch
No.	Portrait	Name	Took office	Left office	Term length	Service branch
1	Marmaduke G. Bayne	Vice Admiral; Marmaduke G. Bayne (1920–2005)	1976	1977	~1 year, 0 days	U.S. Navy
2	Robert G. Gard Jr.	Lieutenant General; Robert G. Gard Jr. (1928–2026)	1977	July 1981	~4 years, 181 days	U.S. Army
3	John S. Pustay	Lieutenant General; John S. Pustay (born 1931)	July 1981	October 1983	~2 years, 92 days	U.S. Air Force
4	Richard D. Lawrence	Lieutenant General; Richard D. Lawrence (1930–2016)	October 1983	September 1986	~2 years, 335 days	U.S. Army
5	Bradley C. Hosmer	Lieutenant General; Bradley C. Hosmer (born 1937)	September 1986	September 1989	~3 years, 0 days	U.S. Air Force
6	John A. Baldwin Jr.	Vice Admiral; John A. Baldwin Jr. (born 1933)	September 1989	August 14, 1992	~2 years, 348 days	U.S. Navy
7	Paul G. Cerjan	Lieutenant General; Paul G. Cerjan (1938–2011)	August 14, 1992	September 1994	~2 years, 18 days	U.S. Army
8	Ervin J. Rokke	Lieutenant General; Ervin J. Rokke (born 1939)	September 1994	1997	~2 years, 122 days	U.S. Air Force
9	Richard A. Chilcoat	Lieutenant General; Richard A. Chilcoat (1938–2010)	1997	2000	~3 years, 0 days	U.S. Army
10	Paul G. Gaffney II	Vice Admiral; Paul G. Gaffney II (born 1946)	July 7, 2000	July 2, 2003	2 years, 360 days	U.S. Navy
11	Michael M. Dunn	Lieutenant General; Michael M. Dunn (born 1950)	July 2, 2003	July 14, 2006	3 years, 12 days	U.S. Air Force
12	Frances C. Wilson	Lieutenant General; Frances C. Wilson (born 1948)	July 14, 2006	July 10, 2009	2 years, 361 days	U.S. Marine Corps
13	Ann E. Rondeau	Vice Admiral; Ann E. Rondeau (born 1951)	July 10, 2009	April 13, 2012	2 years, 278 days	U.S. Navy
-	Nancy McEldowney	Nancy McEldowney (born 1958); Acting	April 13, 2012	July 11, 2012	89 days	Senior Executive; Service
14	Gregg F. Martin	Major General; Gregg F. Martin (born 1956)	July 11, 2012	July 21, 2014	2 years, 10 days	U.S. Army
-	Wanda Nesbitt	Wanda Nesbitt (born 1956); Acting	July 21, 2014	November 18, 2014	120 days	Senior Executive; Service
15	Frederick M. Padilla	Major General; Frederick M. Padilla (born 1959)	November 18, 2014	September 25, 2017	2 years, 311 days	U.S. Marine Corps
16	Fritz Roegge	Vice Admiral; Fritz Roegge (born 1958)	September 25, 2017	February 3, 2021	3 years, 131 days	U.S. Navy
17	Michael T. Plehn	Lieutenant General; Michael T. Plehn (born 1964)	February 3, 2021	October 11, 2024	3 years, 251 days	U.S. Air Force
18	Peter Garvin	Vice Admiral; Peter Garvin (born c. 1967)	October 11, 2024	Incumbent	2 years, 4 days	U.S. Navy

== See also ==
- Air University (United States Air Force), Alabama
- Defense Acquisition University, Fort Belvoir, Virginia
- National Intelligence University, Washington, D.C.
- NATO Defense College, Rome, Italy
- Naval Postgraduate School, Monterey, California
- Naval War College, Newport, Rhode Island
- U.S. Army War College, Carlisle, Pennsylvania
