= July 4 =

July 4 this year in various calendars
- Saturday, 4 July 2026
Akan	Fomemene
Armenian	19 Hrotich 1475
Aztec	Tepeilhuitl 15, 7 Calli
Babylonian	18 Simanu, 2337 SE
Balinese pawukon	Menga, Pasah, Sri, Paing, Tungleh, Saniscara of Langkir, Sri, Urungan, Dewa
Bengali	20 Asharh, BS 1433
Chinese	Yin Earth Rabbit・Girl Mansion; Fire Horse Year, Month 5, Day 20 (Xiazhi, 3 days until Xiaoshu)
Common Era	4 July 2026 CE
Coptic	27 Paoni, AM 1742
Egyptian	19 Athyr, 2775 NE
Ethiopian	27 Sanē, 2018 Amätä Məhrät
French Republican	Décade II, Sextidi de Messidor de l'Année 234 de la République
Gregorian	4 July, AD 2026
Hebrew	19 Tamuz, AM 5786
Hindu	Dhaniṣṭhā・Prīti; Solar: 20 Āṣāḍha, 1948 SE; Lunisolar: Caturthī, Kṛishna pakṣa of Jyeṣṭha, 2083 VE; Rāudra・5127 KY・1,872,760
Icelandic	Laugardagur, 13 Sólmánuður 2026
Islamic	18 Muharram, AH 1448 (using tabular method)
ISO week date	2026-W27-6
Japanese	20 Satsuki, Reiwa 8 (Geshi, 3 days until Shōsho)
Julian	21 June, AD 2026 (AM 7534)
Julian day	2461226
Korean	20 Maldal, 4359 DE
Maya	13.0.13.13.3; 16 Tzec, 7 Akbal
Roman	ante diem XI Kalendas Iulias, MMDCCLXXIX AUC
Solar Hijri	13 Tir, SH 1405
Tibetan	19 snron, me pho rta 2153 or 1772 or 1000

<<	July					>>
Su	Mo	Tu	We	Th	Fr	Sa
			1	2	3	4
5	6	7	8	9	10	11
12	13	14	15	16	17	18
19	20	21	22	23	24	25
26	27	28	29	30	31
2026

July 4 in recent years
2026 (Saturday)
2025 (Friday)
2024 (Thursday)
2023 (Tuesday)
2022 (Monday)
2021 (Sunday)
2020 (Saturday)
2019 (Thursday)
2018 (Wednesday)
2017 (Tuesday)

July 4 is the 185th day of the year (186th in leap years) in the Gregorian calendar; 180 days remain until the end of the year.

== Events ==
=== Pre-1600 ===
- 362 BC – Battle of Mantinea: The Thebans, led by Epaminondas, defeat the Spartans.
- 26 BC – Marcus Licinius Crassus is granted a triumph for his victory in Thrace.
- 414 – Aelia Pulcheria takes a vow of chastity and is proclaimed Augusta, thus becoming the regent of the Byzantine Empire for her 13-year-old brother Theodosius II after the death of the previous regent, praefect Anthemius.
- 638 – Heraclonas and David, sons of Byzantine Emperor Heraclius, are proclaimed augustus and caesar respectively, possibly due to the bad health of their elder brother Heraclius Constantine.
- 836 – Pactum Sicardi, a peace treaty between the Principality of Benevento and the Duchy of Naples, is signed.
- 993 – Ulrich of Augsburg is canonized as a saint.
- 1054 – A supernova, called SN 1054, is seen by Chinese Song dynasty, Arab, and possibly indigenous American observers near the star Zeta Tauri. For several months it remains bright enough to be seen during the day. Its remnants form the Crab Nebula.
- 1120 – Jordan II of Capua is anointed as prince after his infant nephew's death.
- 1187 – The Crusades: Battle of Hattin: Saladin defeats Guy of Lusignan, King of Jerusalem.
- 1253 – Battle of West-Capelle: John I of Avesnes defeats Guy of Dampierre.
- 1333 – Genkō War: Forces loyal to Emperor Go-Daigo seize Tōshō-ji during the Siege of Kamakura. Hōjō Takatoki and other members of the Hōjō clan commit suicide, ending the rule of the Kamakura shogunate.
- 1359 – Francesco II Ordelaffi of Forlì surrenders to the Papal commander Gil de Albornoz.
- 1456 – Ottoman–Hungarian wars: The Siege of Nándorfehérvár (Belgrade) begins.
- 1534 – Christian III is elected King of Denmark and Norway in the town of Rye.
- 1584 – Philip Amadas and Arthur Barlowe arrive at Roanoke Island.

=== 1601–1900 ===
- 1610 – The Battle of Klushino is fought between forces of the Polish–Lithuanian Commonwealth and Russia during the Polish–Russian War, after which Polish troops entered Moscow.
- 1634 – The city of Trois-Rivières is founded in New France (now Quebec, Canada).
- 1744 – The Treaty of Lancaster, in which the Iroquois cede lands between the Allegheny Mountains and the Ohio River to the British colonies, is signed in Lancaster, Pennsylvania.
- 1774 – Orangetown Resolutions are adopted in the Province of New York, one of many protests against the British Parliament's Coercive Acts.
- 1776 – American Revolution: The United States Declaration of Independence is adopted by the Second Continental Congress, formally announcing and explaining separation from the Kingdom of Great Britain and the creation of the United States.
- 1778 – American Revolutionary War: U.S. forces under George Clark capture Kaskaskia during the Illinois campaign.
- 1802 – The United States Military Academy opens at West Point, New York.
- 1803 – The Louisiana Purchase is announced to the public.
- 1817 – In Rome, New York, construction on the Erie Canal begins.
- 1818 – U.S. Flag Act of 1818 goes into effect creating a 13-stripe flag with a star for each state. New stars are to be added on the July 4 following the admission of each new state to the Union.
- 1827 – Slavery is abolished in the State of New York.
- 1831 – Samuel Francis Smith writes "My Country, 'Tis of Thee" for the Boston, Massachusetts July 4 festivities.
- 1832 – John Neal delivers the first public lecture in the U.S. to advocate the rights of women.
- 1832 – Durham University established by Act of Parliament; the first recognized university to be founded in England since Cambridge over 600 years earlier.
- 1837 – Grand Junction Railway, the world's first long-distance railway, opens between Birmingham and Liverpool.
- 1838 – The Iowa Territory is organized.
- 1845 – Henry David Thoreau moves into a small cabin on Walden Pond in Concord, Massachusetts. Thoreau's account of his two years there, Walden, will become a touchstone of the environmental movement.
- 1855 – The first edition of Walt Whitman's book of poems, Leaves of Grass, is published in Brooklyn.
- 1862 – Lewis Carroll tells Alice Liddell a story that would grow into Alice's Adventures in Wonderland and its sequels.
- 1863 – American Civil War: Siege of Vicksburg: The Confederate army in Vicksburg, Mississippi surrenders to Union forces under Ulysses S. Grant after 47 days of siege, contributing to the Union capture of the Mississippi River.
- 1863 – American Civil War: Union forces repulse a Confederate army at the Battle of Helena in Arkansas. The battle thwarts a Rebel attempt to relieve pressure on the besieged city of Vicksburg, and paves the way for the Union capture of Little Rock.
- 1863 – American Civil War: Retreat from Gettysburg: The Confederate Army of Northern Virginia under Robert E. Lee withdraws from the battlefield after losing the Battle of Gettysburg, signaling an end to his last invasion of the North.
- 1879 – Anglo-Zulu War: The Zululand capital of Ulundi is captured by British troops and burned to the ground, ending the war and forcing King Cetshwayo to flee.
- 1881 – In Alabama, the Tuskegee Institute opens.
- 1886 – The Canadian Pacific Railway's first scheduled train from Montreal arrives in Port Moody on the Pacific coast, after six days of travel.
- 1887 – The founder of Pakistan, Quaid-i-Azam Muhammad Ali Jinnah, joins Sindh-Madrasa-tul-Islam, Karachi.
- 1892 – Western Samoa changes the International Date Line, causing Monday (July 4) to occur twice, resulting in a leap year with 367 days.
- 1894 – The short-lived Republic of Hawaii is proclaimed by Sanford B. Dole.
- 1898 – En route from New York to Le Havre, the SS La Bourgogne collides with another ship and sinks with the loss of 549 lives, one of the worst maritime disasters in history.

=== 1901–present ===
- 1901 – William Howard Taft becomes American governor of the Philippines.
- 1903 – The Philippine–American War is officially concluded.
- 1910 – The Johnson–Jeffries riots occur after African-American boxer Jack Johnson knocks out white boxer Jim Jeffries in the 15th round. Between 11 and 26 people are killed and hundreds more injured.
- 1911 – A massive heat wave strikes the northeastern United States, killing 380 people in eleven days and breaking temperature records in several cities.
- 1913 – President Woodrow Wilson addresses American Civil War veterans at the Great Reunion of 1913.
- 1914 – The funeral of Archduke Franz Ferdinand and his wife Sophie takes place in Vienna, six days after their assassinations in Sarajevo.
- 1918 – Mehmed V died at the age of 73 and Ottoman sultan Mehmed VI ascends to the throne.
- 1918 – World War I: The Battle of Hamel, a successful attack by the Australian Corps against German positions near the town of Le Hamel on the Western Front.
- 1927 – First flight of the Lockheed Vega.
- 1939 – Lou Gehrig, recently diagnosed with Amyotrophic lateral sclerosis, informs a crowd at Yankee Stadium that he considers himself "The luckiest man on the face of the earth", then announces his retirement from major league baseball.
- 1941 – Nazi crimes against the Polish nation: Nazi troops massacre Polish scientists and writers in the captured Ukrainian city of Lviv.
- 1941 – World War II: The Burning of the Riga synagogues: The Great Choral Synagogue in German-occupied Riga is burnt with 300 Jews locked in the basement.
- 1942 – World War II: The 250-day Siege of Sevastopol in the Crimea ends when the city falls to Axis forces.
- 1943 – World War II: The Battle of Kursk, the largest full-scale battle in history and the world's largest tank battle, begins in the village of Prokhorovka.
- 1943 – World War II: In Gibraltar, a Royal Air Force B-24 Liberator bomber crashes into the sea in an apparent accident moments after takeoff, killing sixteen passengers on board, including general Władysław Sikorski, the commander-in-chief of the Polish Army and the Prime Minister of the Polish government-in-exile; only the pilot survives.
- 1946 – The Kielce pogrom against Jewish Holocaust survivors in Poland.
- 1946 – After 381 years of near-continuous colonial rule by various powers, the Philippines attains full independence from the United States.
- 1947 – The "Indian Independence Bill" is presented before the British House of Commons, proposing the independence of the Provinces of British India into two sovereign countries: India and Pakistan.
- 1950 – Cold War: Radio Free Europe first broadcasts.
- 1951 – Cold War: A court in Czechoslovakia sentences American journalist William N. Oatis to ten years in prison on charges of espionage.
- 1951 – William Shockley announces the invention of the junction transistor.
- 1954 – Food rationing in Great Britain ends, with the lifting of restrictions on sale and purchase of meat, 14 years after it began early in World War II, and nearly a decade after the war's end.
- 1960 – The 50-star flag of the United States debuts in Philadelphia following the admission of Hawaii as the 50th U.S. state over ten months prior (August 21, 1959), in accordance with the Flag Acts.
- 1961 – On its maiden voyage, the Soviet nuclear-powered submarine K-19 suffers a complete loss of coolant to its reactor. The crew are able to effect repairs, but 22 of them die of radiation poisoning over the following two years.
- 1966 – U.S. President Lyndon B. Johnson signs the Freedom of Information Act into United States law. The act went into effect the next year.
- 1973 – Barbados, Guyana, Jamaica, and Trinidad and Tobago sign the Treaty of Chaguaramas in Chaguaramas, Trinidad and Tobago establishing the Caribbean Community (CARICOM). It replaces the Caribbean Free Trade Association as another step towards Caribbean regional integration.
- 1976 – Israeli commandos raid Entebbe airport in Uganda, rescuing all but four of the passengers and crew of an Air France jetliner seized by Palestinian terrorists.
- 1977 – The George Jackson Brigade plants a bomb at the main power substation for the Washington state capitol in Olympia, in solidarity with a prison strike at the Walla Walla State Penitentiary Intensive Security Unit.
- 1982 – Three Iranian diplomats and a journalist are kidnapped in Lebanon by Phalange forces, and their fate remains unknown.
- 1982 – Space Shuttle program: Columbia lands at Edwards Air Force Base at the end of the program's final test flight, STS-4. President Ronald Reagan declares the Space Shuttle to be operational.
- 1994 – Rwandan genocide: Kigali, the Rwandan capital, is captured by the Rwandan Patriotic Front, ending the genocide in the city.
- 1997 – NASA's Pathfinder space probe lands on the surface of Mars.
- 1998 – Japan launches the Nozomi probe to Mars, joining the United States and Russia as a space exploring nation.
- 2001 – Vladivostok Air Flight 352 crashes on approach to Irkutsk Airport, killing all 145 people on board.
- 2002 – A Boeing 707 crashes near Bangui M'Poko International Airport in Bangui, Central African Republic, killing 28.
- 2004 – The cornerstone of the Freedom Tower is laid on the World Trade Center site in New York City.
- 2004 – Greece beats Portugal in the UEFA Euro 2004 Final and becomes European Champion for first time in its history.
- 2005 – The Deep Impact collider hits the comet Tempel 1.
- 2006 – Space Shuttle program: Discovery launches STS-121 to the International Space Station. The event gained wide media attention as it was the only shuttle launch in the program's history to occur on the United States' Independence Day.
- 2008 – A bomb explodes at a concert in Minsk's Independence Square, injuring 50 people.
- 2009 – The Statue of Liberty's crown reopens to the public after eight years of closure due to security concerns following the September 11 attacks.
- 2009 – The first of four days of bombings begins on the southern Philippine island group of Mindanao.
- 2012 – The discovery of particles consistent with the Higgs boson at the Large Hadron Collider is announced at CERN.
- 2015 – Chile claims its first title in international football by defeating Argentina in the 2015 Copa América final.
- 2024 – The Labour Party, led by Keir Starmer, wins a landslide majority in the 2024 United Kingdom general election, ending 14 years of Conservative government.
- 2025 – A devastating flood strikes the Texas Hill Country, killing at least 108 people.
- 2025 – The Oasis Live '25 tour begins in Principality Stadium, Cardiff, ending a 16-year hiatus.

== Births ==
=== Pre-1600 ===
- 68 – Salonia Matidia, Roman daughter of Ulpia Marciana (died 119)
- 1095 – Usama ibn Munqidh, Muslim poet, author and faris (Knight) (died 1188)
- 1330 – Ashikaga Yoshiakira, Japanese shōgun (died 1367)
- 1477 – Johannes Aventinus, Bavarian historian and philologist (died 1534)
- 1546 – Murad III, Ottoman sultan (died 1595)

=== 1601–1900 ===
- 1656 – John Leake, Royal Navy admiral (died 1720)
- 1694 – Louis-Claude Daquin, French organist and composer (died 1772)
- 1715 – Christian Fürchtegott Gellert, German poet and academic (died 1769)
- 1719 – Michel-Jean Sedaine, French playwright (died 1797)
- 1729 – George Leonard, American lawyer, jurist and politician (died 1819)
- 1753 – Jean-Pierre Blanchard, French inventor, best known as a pioneer in balloon flight (died 1809)
- 1790 – George Everest, Welsh geographer and surveyor (died 1866)
- 1799 – Oscar I of Sweden (died 1859)
- 1803 – John Adams II , son of President John Quincy Adams and grandson of President John Adams (died 1834)
- 1804 – Nathaniel Hawthorne, American novelist and short story writer (died 1864)
- 1807 – Giuseppe Garibaldi, Italian general and politician (died 1882)
- 1816 – Hiram Walker, American businessman, founded Canadian Club whisky (died 1899)
- 1826 – Stephen Foster, American songwriter and composer (died 1864)
- 1842 – Hermann Cohen, German philosopher (died 1918)
- 1845 – Thomas John Barnardo, Irish philanthropist and humanitarian (died 1905)
- 1847 – James Anthony Bailey, American circus ringmaster, co-founded Ringling Bros. and Barnum & Bailey Circus (died 1906)
- 1854 – Victor Babeș, Romanian physician and biologist (died 1926)
- 1868 – Henrietta Swan Leavitt, American astronomer and academic (died 1921)
- 1886 – Tom Longboat, Canadian runner and soldier (died 1949)
- 1871 – Hubert Cecil Booth, English engineer (died 1955)
- 1872 – Calvin Coolidge, American lawyer and politician, 30th President of the United States (died 1933)
- 1874 – John McPhee, Australian journalist and politician, 27th Premier of Tasmania (died 1952)
- 1880 – Victor Kraft, Austrian philosopher from the Vienna Circle (died 1975)
- 1881 – Ulysses S. Grant III, American general (died 1968)
- 1883 – Rube Goldberg, American sculptor, cartoonist, and engineer (died 1970)
- 1887 – Pio Pion, Italian engineer and businessman (died 1965)
- 1888 – Henry Armetta, Italian-American actor and singer (died 1945)
- 1895 – Irving Caesar, American songwriter and composer (died 1996)
- 1896 – Mao Dun, Chinese journalist, author, and critic (died 1981)
- 1897 – Alluri Sitarama Raju, Indian activist (died 1924)
- 1898 – Pilar Barbosa, Puerto Rican-American historian and activist (died 1997)
- 1898 – Gertrude Lawrence, British actress, singer, and dancer (died 1952)
- 1898 – Gulzarilal Nanda, Indian politician (died 1998)
- 1898 – Gertrude Weaver, American supercentenarian (died 2015)
- 1900 – Belinda Dann, Indigenous Australian who was one of the Stolen Generation, reunited with family aged 107 (died 2007)
- 1900 – Nellie Mae Rowe, American folk artist (died 1982)

=== 1901–present ===
- 1902 – Meyer Lansky, American gangster (died 1983)
- 1902 – George Murphy, American actor and politician (died 1992)
- 1903 – Flor Peeters, Belgian organist, composer, and educator (died 1986)
- 1904 – Angela Baddeley, English actress (died 1976)
- 1905 – Irving Johnson, American sailor and author (died 1991)
- 1905 – Robert Hankey, 2nd Baron Hankey, British diplomat and public servant (died 1996)
- 1905 – Lionel Trilling, American critic, essayist, short story writer, and educator (died 1975)
- 1906 – Vincent Schaefer, American chemist and meteorologist (died 1993)
- 1907 – John Anderson, American discus thrower (died 1948)
- 1907 – Howard Taubman, American author and critic (died 1996)
- 1909 – Alec Templeton, Welsh composer, pianist and satirist (died 1963)
- 1910 – Champion Jack Dupree, American boxer, blues and boogie-woogie pianist, singer-songwriter (died 1992)
- 1910 – Robert K. Merton, American sociologist and scholar (died 2003)
- 1910 – Gloria Stuart, American actress (died 2010)
- 1911 – Bruce Hamilton, Australian public servant (died 1989)
- 1911 – Mitch Miller, American singer and producer (died 2010)
- 1911 – Elizabeth Peratrovich, Alaskan-American civil rights activist (died 1958)
- 1914 – Nuccio Bertone, Italian automobile designer (died 1997)
- 1915 – Timmie Rogers, American actor and singer-songwriter (died 2006)
- 1916 – Iva Toguri D'Aquino, American typist and broadcaster (inappropriately known as 'Tokyo Rose') (died 2006)
- 1918 – Eppie Lederer, American journalist (Ann Landers) and radio host (died 2002)
- 1918 – Johnnie Parsons, American race car driver (died 1984)
- 1918 – King Taufa'ahau Tupou IV of Tonga, (died 2006)
- 1918 – Alec Bedser, English cricketer (died 2010)
- 1918 – Eric Bedser, English cricketer (died 2006)
- 1918 – Pauline Phillips, American journalist and radio host, created Dear Abby (died 2013)
- 1920 – Norm Drucker, American basketball player and referee (died 2015)
- 1920 – Leona Helmsley, American businesswoman (died 2007)
- 1920 – Fritz Wilde, German footballer and manager (died 1977)
- 1920 – Paul Bannai, American politician (died 2019)
- 1921 – Gérard Debreu, French economist and mathematician, Nobel Prize laureate (died 2004)
- 1921 – Nasser Sharifi, Iranian sports shooter
- 1921 – Metropolitan Mikhail of Asyut (died 2014)
- 1921 – Philip Rose, American actor, playwright, and producer (died 2011)
- 1921 – Tibor Varga, Hungarian violinist and conductor (died 2003)
- 1922 – R. James Harvey, American politician (died 2019)
- 1923 – Rudolf Friedrich, Swiss lawyer and politician (died 2013)
- 1924 – Eva Marie Saint, American actress (died 2026)
- 1924 – Delia Fiallo, Cuban author and screenwriter (died 2021)
- 1924 – Harry Stewart Jr., American military officer and fighter pilot (died 2025)
- 1925 – Ciril Zlobec, Slovene poet, writer, translator, journalist and politician (died 2018)
- 1925 – Dorothy Head Knode, American tennis player (died 2015)
- 1926 – Alfredo Di Stéfano, Argentinian-Spanish footballer and coach (died 2014)
- 1926 – Lake Underwood, American race car driver and businessman (died 2008)
- 1927 – Gina Lollobrigida, Italian actress and photographer (died 2023)
- 1927 – Neil Simon, American playwright and screenwriter (died 2018)
- 1928 – Giampiero Boniperti, Italian footballer and politician (died 2021)
- 1928 – Teofisto Guingona Jr., Filipino politician; 11th Vice President of the Philippines
- 1928 – Jassem Alwan, Syrian Army Officer (died 2018)
- 1928 – Shan Ratnam, Sri Lankan physician and academic (died 2001)
- 1928 – Chuck Tanner, American baseball player and manager (died 2011)
- 1929 – Al Davis, American football player, coach, and manager (died 2011)
- 1929 – Bill Tuttle, American baseball player (died 1998)
- 1930 – George Steinbrenner, American businessman (died 2010)
- 1931 – Stephen Boyd, Northern Ireland-born American actor (died 1977)
- 1931 – Rick Casares, American football player and soldier (died 2013)
- 1931 – Sébastien Japrisot, French author, director, and screenwriter (died 2003)
- 1931 – Peter Richardson, English cricketer (died 2017)
- 1932 – Aurèle Vandendriessche, Belgian runner (died 2023)
- 1934 – Yvonne B. Miller, American academic and politician (died 2012)
- 1934 – Colin Welland, English actor and screenwriter (died 2015)
- 1935 – Paul Scoon, Grenadian politician, 2nd Governor-General of Grenada (died 2013)
- 1936 – Zdzisława Donat, Polish soprano and actress
- 1936 – Dick Hyde, American trombonist and session musician (died 2019)
- 1937 – Thomas Nagel, American philosopher and academic
- 1937 – Queen Sonja of Norway
- 1937 – Richard Rhodes, American journalist and historian
- 1937 – Eric Walters, Australian journalist (died 2010)
- 1938 – Mike Mainieri, American jazz and session vibraphonist
- 1938 – Steven Rose, English biologist and academic (died 2025)
- 1938 – Bill Withers, American singer-songwriter and producer (died 2020)
- 1940 – Pat Stapleton, Canadian ice hockey player (died 2020)
- 1941 – Sam Farr, American politician
- 1941 – Tomaž Šalamun, Croatian-Slovenian poet and academic (died 2014)
- 1941 – Pavel Sedláček, Czech singer-songwriter and guitarist
- 1941 – Brian Willson, American soldier, lawyer, and activist
- 1942 – Hal Lanier, American baseball player, coach, and manager
- 1942 – Floyd Little, American football player and coach (died 2021)
- 1942 – Stefan Meller, French-Polish academic and politician, Polish Minister of Foreign Affairs (died 2008)
- 1942 – Prince Michael of Kent
- 1942 – Peter Rowan, American singer-songwriter and guitarist
- 1943 – Conny Bauer, German trombonist
- 1943 – Emerson Boozer, American football player and sportscaster
- 1943 – Adam Hart-Davis, English historian, author, and photographer
- 1943 – Geraldo Rivera, American lawyer, journalist, and author
- 1943 – Fred Wesley, American jazz and funk trombonist
- 1943 – Alan Wilson, American singer-songwriter and guitarist (died 1970)
- 1945 – Andre Spitzer, Romanian-Israeli fencer and coach (died 1972)
- 1946 – Ron Kovic, American author and activist
- 1946 – Michael Milken, American businessman and philanthropist
- 1947 – Lembit Ulfsak, Estonian actor and director (died 2017)
- 1948 – René Arnoux, French race car driver
- 1948 – Tommy Körberg, Swedish singer and actor
- 1948 – Jeremy Spencer, English singer-songwriter and guitarist
- 1950 – Philip Craven, English basketball player and swimmer
- 1950 – David Jensen, Canadian-English radio and television host
- 1951 – John Alexander, Australian tennis player and politician
- 1951 – Ralph Johnson, American R&B drummer and percussionist
- 1951 – Vladimir Tismăneanu, Romanian-American political scientist, sociologist, and academic
- 1951 – Kathleen Kennedy Townsend, American lawyer and politician, 6th Lieutenant Governor of Maryland
- 1952 – Álvaro Uribe, Colombian lawyer and politician, 39th President of Colombia
- 1952 – Carol MacReady, English actress
- 1952 – John Waite, English singer-songwriter and guitarist
- 1952 – Paul Rogat Loeb, American author and activist
- 1953 – Francis Maude, English lawyer and politician, Minister for the Cabinet Office
- 1954 – Jim Beattie, American baseball player, coach, and manager
- 1954 – Morganna, American model, actress, and dancer
- 1954 – Devendra Kumar Joshi, 21st Chief of Naval Staff of the Indian Navy
- 1955 – Eero Heinäluoma, Finnish politician
- 1955 – Kevin Nichols, Australian cyclist
- 1956 – Robert Sinclair MacKay, British academic and educator
- 1957 – Rein Lang, Estonian politician and diplomat, 25th Estonian Minister of Foreign Affairs
- 1958 – Vera Leth, Greenlandic Ombudsman
- 1958 – Kirk Pengilly, Australian guitarist, saxophonist, and songwriter
- 1958 – Carl Valentine, Canadian soccer player, coach, and manager
- 1959 – Victoria Abril, Spanish actress and singer
- 1960 – Roland Ratzenberger, Austrian race car driver (died 1994)
- 1961 – Richard Garriott, English-American video game designer, created the Ultima series
- 1962 – Pam Shriver, American tennis player and sportscaster
- 1963 – Henri Leconte, French tennis player and sportscaster
- 1963 – Laureano Márquez, Spanish-Venezuelan political scientist and journalist
- 1963 – José Oquendo, Puerto Rican-American baseball player and coach
- 1963 – Sonia Pierre, Haitian-Dominican human rights activist (died 2011)
- 1963 – Michael Sweet, American singer and guitarist, lead singer of the Christian rock band Stryper
- 1964 – Cle Kooiman, American soccer player and manager
- 1964 – Elie Saab, Lebanese fashion designer
- 1964 – Edi Rama, Albanian politician
- 1964 – Mark Slaughter, American singer-songwriter and producer
- 1964 – Mark Whiting, American actor, director, and screenwriter
- 1965 – Harvey Grant, American basketball player and coach
- 1965 – Horace Grant, American basketball player and coach
- 1965 – Kiriakos Karataidis, Greek footballer and manager
- 1965 – Gérard Watkins, English actor and playwright
- 1966 – Ronni Ancona, Scottish actress and screenwriter
- 1966 – Minas Hantzidis, German-Greek footballer
- 1966 – Lee Reherman, American actor (died 2016)
- 1967 – Vinny Castilla, Mexican baseball player and manager
- 1967 – Sébastien Deleigne, French athlete
- 1969 – Al Golden, American football player and coach
- 1969 – Todd Marinovich, American football player and coach
- 1969 – Wilfred Mugeyi, Zimbabwean footballer and coach
- 1972 – Stephen Giles, Canadian canoe racer and engineer
- 1972 – Mike Knuble, Canadian-American ice hockey player and coach
- 1973 – Keiko Ihara, Japanese race car driver
- 1973 – Gackt, Japanese musician, singer, songwriter, record producer and actor
- 1973 – Michael Johnson, English-Jamaican footballer and manager
- 1973 – Anjelika Krylova, Russian ice dancer and coach
- 1973 – Jan Magnussen, Danish race car driver
- 1973 – Tony Popovic, Australian footballer and manager
- 1974 – Jill Craybas, American tennis player
- 1974 – La'Roi Glover, American football player and sportscaster
- 1974 – Adrian Griffin, American basketball player and coach
- 1976 – Daijiro Kato, Japanese motorcycle racer (died 2003)
- 1976 – Yevgeniya Medvedeva, Russian skier
- 1978 – Marcos Daniel, Brazilian tennis player
- 1978 – Émile Mpenza, Belgian footballer
- 1979 – Siim Kabrits, Estonian politician
- 1979 – Josh McCown, American football player
- 1979 – Renny Vega, Venezuelan footballer
- 1980 – Kwame Steede, Bermudan footballer
- 1981 – Dedé, Angolan footballer
- 1981 – Brock Berlin, American football player
- 1981 – Christoph Preuß, German footballer
- 1981 – Francisco Cruceta, Dominican baseball player
- 1981 – Will Smith, American football player (died 2016)
- 1982 – Vladimir Boisa, Georgian basketball player
- 1982 – Vladimir Gusev, Russian cyclist
- 1982 – Jeff Lima, New Zealand rugby league player
- 1982 – Michael "The Situation" Sorrentino, American model, author and television personality
- 1983 – Melanie Fiona, Canadian singer-songwriter
- 1983 – Amantle Montsho, Botswanan sprinter
- 1983 – Miguel Pinto, Chilean footballer
- 1983 – Amol Rajan, Indian-English journalist
- 1983 – Mattia Serafini, Italian footballer
- 1984 – Jin Akanishi, Japanese singer-songwriter
- 1985 – Kane Tenace, Australian footballer
- 1985 – Dimitrios Mavroeidis, Greek basketball player
- 1985 – Wason Rentería, Colombian footballer
- 1986 – Ömer Aşık, Turkish basketball player
- 1986 – Nguyen Ngoc Duy, Vietnamese footballer
- 1986 – Rafael Arévalo, Salvadoran tennis player
- 1986 – Willem Janssen, Dutch footballer
- 1986 – Terrance Knighton, American football player
- 1986 – Marte Elden, Norwegian skier
- 1987 – Wude Ayalew, Ethiopian runner
- 1987 – Guram Kashia, Georgian footballer
- 1988 – Angelique Boyer, French-Mexican actress
- 1989 – Benjamin Büchel, Liechtensteiner footballer
- 1990 – Jake Gardiner, American ice hockey player
- 1990 – Richard Mpong, Ghanaian footballer
- 1990 – Naoki Yamada, Japanese footballer
- 1990 – Ihar Yasinski, Belarusian footballer
- 1992 – Ángel Romero, Paraguayan footballer
- 1992 – Óscar Romero, Paraguayan footballer
- 1993 – Tom Barkhuizen, English footballer
- 1995 – Post Malone, American rapper, singer, songwriter and record producer
- 1999 – Moa Kikuchi, Japanese musician
- 2003 – Polina Bogusevich, Russian singer

== Deaths ==
=== Pre-1600 ===
- 673 – Ecgberht, king of Kent
- 907 – Luitpold, margrave of Bavaria
- 907 – Dietmar I, archbishop of Salzburg
- 910 – Luo Shaowei, Chinese warlord (born 877)
- 940 – Wang Jianli, Chinese general (born 871)
- 943 – Taejo of Goryeo, Korean king (born 877)
- 945 – Zhuo Yanming, Chinese Buddhist monk and emperor
- 965 – Benedict V, pope of the Catholic Church
- 973 – Ulrich of Augsburg, German bishop and saint (born 890)
- 975 – Gwangjong of Goryeo, Korean king (born 925)
- 1187 – Raynald of Châtillon, French knight (born 1125)
- 1307 – Rudolf I of Bohemia (born 1281)
- 1336 – Saint Elizabeth of Portugal (born 1271)
- 1429 – Carlo I Tocco, ruler of Epirus (born 1372)
- 1533 – John Frith, English priest, writer, and martyr (born 1503)
- 1541 – Pedro de Alvarado, Spanish general and explorer (born 1495)
- 1546 – Hayreddin Barbarossa, Ottoman admiral (born 1478)
- 1551 – Gregory Cromwell, 1st Baron Cromwell, English politician (born 1514)

=== 1601–1900 ===
- 1603 – Philippe de Monte, Flemish composer and educator (born 1521)
- 1623 – William Byrd, English composer (born c. 1540)
- 1644 – Brian Twyne, English academic, antiquarian and archivist (born 1581)
- 1648 – Antoine Daniel, French missionary and saint, one of the eight Canadian Martyrs (born 1601)
- 1742 – Luigi Guido Grandi, Italian monk, mathematician, and engineer (born 1671)
- 1754 – Philippe Néricault Destouches, French playwright and author (born 1680)
- 1761 – Samuel Richardson, English author and painter (born 1689)
- 1780 – Prince Charles Alexander of Lorraine (born 1712)
- 1787 – Charles, Prince of Soubise, Marshal of France (born 1715)
- 1821 – Richard Cosway, English painter and academic (born 1742)
- 1826 – John Adams, American lawyer and politician, 2nd President of the United States (born 1735)
- 1826 – Thomas Jefferson, American architect, lawyer, and politician, 3rd President of the United States (born 1743)
- 1831 – James Monroe, American soldier, lawyer, and politician, 5th President of the United States (born 1758)
- 1848 – François-René de Chateaubriand, French historian and politician (born 1768)
- 1850 – William Kirby, English entomologist and author (born 1759)
- 1854 – Karl Friedrich Eichhorn, German academic and jurist (born 1781)
- 1857 – William L. Marcy, American lawyer, judge, and politician, 21st United States Secretary of State (born 1786)
- 1881 – Johan Vilhelm Snellman, Finnish philosopher and politician (born 1806)
- 1882 – Joseph Brackett, American composer and author (born 1797)
- 1886 – Poundmaker, Canadian tribal chief (born 1797)
- 1891 – Hannibal Hamlin, American lawyer and politician, 15th Vice President of the United States (born 1809)

=== 1901–present ===
- 1901 – Johannes Schmidt, German linguist and academic (born 1843)
- 1902 – Swami Vivekananda, Indian monk and saint (born 1863)
- 1905 – Élisée Reclus, French geographer and author (born 1830)
- 1910 – Melville Fuller, American lawyer and jurist, Chief Justice of the United States (born 1833)
- 1910 – Kabua the Great, Marshallese iroijlaplap (born c. 1820)
- 1910 – Giovanni Schiaparelli, Italian astronomer and historian (born 1835)
- 1916 – Alan Seeger, American soldier and poet (born 1888)
- 1922 – Lothar von Richthofen, German lieutenant and pilot (born 1894)
- 1926 – Pier Giorgio Frassati, Italian activist and saint (born 1901)
- 1934 – Marie Curie, French-Polish physicist and chemist, Nobel Prize laureate (born 1867)
- 1935 – Anna Paaske, Norwegian opera singer and music teacher (born 1856)
- 1938 – Otto Bauer, Austrian philosopher and politician, Austrian Minister of Foreign Affairs (born 1881)
- 1938 – Suzanne Lenglen, French tennis player (born 1899)
- 1941 – Antoni Łomnicki, Polish mathematician and academic (born 1881)
- 1943 – Władysław Sikorski, Polish general and politician, 9th Prime Minister of the Second Republic of Poland (born 1881)
- 1946 – Taffy O'Callaghan, Welsh footballer and coach (born 1906)
- 1948 – Monteiro Lobato, Brazilian journalist and author (born 1882)
- 1949 – François Brandt, Dutch rower and engineer (born 1874)
- 1963 – Bernard Freyberg, 1st Baron Freyberg, New Zealand general and politician, 7th Governor-General of New Zealand (born 1889)
- 1963 – Clyde Kennard, American activist and martyr (born 1927)
- 1963 – Pingali Venkayya, Indian activist, designed the Flag of India (born 1876)
- 1964 – Gaby Morlay, French actress and singer (born 1893)
- 1969 – Henri Decoin, French director and screenwriter (born 1890)
- 1970 – Barnett Newman, American painter and illustrator (born 1905)
- 1970 – Harold Stirling Vanderbilt, American sailor and businessman (born 1884)
- 1971 – August Derleth, American anthologist and author (born 1909)
- 1971 – Thomas C. Hart, American admiral and politician (born 1877)
- 1974 – Georgette Heyer, English author (born 1902)
- 1974 – André Randall, French actor (born 1892)
- 1976 – Yonatan Netanyahu, Israeli colonel (born 1946)
- 1976 – Antoni Słonimski, Polish poet and playwright (born 1895)
- 1977 – Gersh Budker, Ukrainian physicist and academic (born 1918)
- 1979 – Lee Wai Tong, Chinese footballer and manager (born 1905)
- 1980 – Maurice Grevisse, Belgian linguist and author (born 1895)
- 1984 – Jimmie Spheeris, American singer-songwriter (born 1949)
- 1986 – Paul-Gilbert Langevin, French musicologist, critique musical and physicist (born 1933)
- 1986 – Flor Peeters, Belgian organist and composer (born 1903)
- 1986 – Oscar Zariski, Belarusian-American mathematician and academic (born 1899)
- 1988 – Adrian Adonis, American wrestler (born 1954)
- 1990 – Olive Ann Burns, American journalist and author (born 1924)
- 1991 – Victor Chang, Chinese-Australian surgeon and physician (born 1936)
- 1991 – Art Sansom, American cartoonist (born 1920)
- 1992 – Astor Piazzolla, Argentinian bandoneon player and composer (born 1921)
- 1993 – Yvette Amice, French mathematician (born 1936)
- 1993 – Bona Arsenault, Canadian historian, genealogist, and politician (born 1903)
- 1994 – Joey Marella, American wrestling referee (born 1964)
- 1995 – Eva Gabor, Hungarian-American actress and singer (born 1919)
- 1995 – Bob Ross, American painter and television host (born 1942)
- 1997 – Charles Kuralt, American journalist (born 1934)
- 1997 – John Zachary Young, English zoologist and neurophysiologist (born 1907)
- 1999 – Leo Garel, American illustrator and educator (born 1917)
- 2000 – Gustaw Herling-Grudziński, Polish journalist and author (born 1919)
- 2002 – Gerald Bales, Canadian organist and composer (born 1919)
- 2002 – Benjamin O. Davis, Jr., American general (born 1912)
- 2003 – Larry Burkett, American author and radio host (born 1939)
- 2003 – André Claveau, French singer (born 1915)
- 2003 – Barry White, American singer-songwriter, pianist, and producer (born 1944)
- 2004 – Jean-Marie Auberson, Swiss violinist and conductor (born 1920)
- 2005 – Cliff Goupille, Canadian ice hockey player (born 1915)
- 2005 – Hank Stram, American football player and coach (born 1923)
- 2007 – Bill Pinkney, American singer (born 1925)
- 2008 – Thomas M. Disch, American author and poet (born 1940)
- 2008 – Jesse Helms, American politician (born 1921)
- 2008 – Evelyn Keyes, American actress (born 1916)
- 2008 – Terrence Kiel, American football player (born 1980)
- 2008 – Charles Wheeler, German-English soldier and journalist (born 1923)
- 2009 – Brenda Joyce, American actress (born 1917)
- 2009 – Allen Klein, American businessman and talent agent, founded ABKCO Records (born 1931)
- 2009 – Drake Levin, American guitarist (born 1946)
- 2009 – Steve McNair, American football player (born 1973)
- 2009 – Lasse Strömstedt, Swedish author and actor (born 1935)
- 2009 – Jean-Baptiste Tati Loutard, Congolese poet and politician (born 1938)
- 2010 – Robert Neil Butler, American physician and author (born 1927)
- 2012 – Hiren Bhattacharyya, Indian poet and author (born 1932)
- 2012 – Jimmy Bivins, American boxer (born 1919)
- 2012 – Jeong Min-hyeong, South Korean footballer (born 1987)
- 2012 – Eric Sykes, English actor, director, and screenwriter (born 1923)
- 2013 – Onllwyn Brace, Welsh rugby player and sportscaster (born 1932)
- 2013 – Jack Crompton, English footballer and manager (born 1921)
- 2013 – James Fulton, American dermatologist and academic (born 1940)
- 2013 – Charles A. Hines, American general (born 1935)
- 2013 – Bernie Nolan, Irish singer (born 1960)
- 2014 – Giorgio Faletti, Italian author, screenwriter, and actor (born 1950)
- 2014 – C. J. Henderson, American author and critic (born 1951)
- 2014 – Earl Robinson, American baseball player (born 1936)
- 2014 – Richard Mellon Scaife, American businessman (born 1932)
- 2015 – Nedelcho Beronov, Bulgarian judge and politician (born 1928)
- 2015 – William Conrad Gibbons, American historian, author, and academic (born 1926)
- 2016 – Abbas Kiarostami, Iranian film director, screenwriter, poet, and photographer (born 1940)
- 2017 – John Blackwell, American R&B, funk, and jazz drummer (born 1973)
- 2017 – Daniil Granin, Soviet and Russian author (born 1919)
- 2017 – Gene Conley, American MLB player and NBA player (born 1930)
- 2018 – Henri Dirickx, Belgian footballer (born 1927)
- 2018 – Robby Müller, Dutch cinematographer (born 1940)
- 2021 – Harmoko, Indonesian politician, former parliament speaker and government minister (born 1939)
- 2021 – Matīss Kivlenieks, Latvian ice hockey goaltender (born 1996)
- 2022 – Cláudio Hummes, Brazilian prelate of the Catholic Church (born 1934)
- 2022 – Kazuki Takahashi, Japanese manga artist (born 1961)
- 2025 – Lyndon Byers, Canadian ice hockey player and radio host (born 1964)
- 2025 – Richard Greenberg, American playwright and television writer (born 1958)
- 2025 – Bobby Jenks, American baseball player (born 1981)
- 2025 – Peter Russell-Clarke, Australian chef, author and illustrator (born 1935)
- 2025 – Mark Snow, American composer for film and television (born 1946)

== Holidays and observances ==
- Christian feast day:
  - Antoine Daniel
  - Andrew of Crete
  - Bertha of Artois
  - Blessed Catherine Jarrige
  - Blessed Józef Kowalski
  - Pier Giorgio Frassati
  - Elizabeth of Aragon (or of Portugal)
  - Oda of Canterbury
  - Ulrich of Augsburg
  - July 4 (Eastern Orthodox liturgics)
- CARICOM Day
- The first evening of Dree Festival, celebrated until July 7 (Apatani people, Arunachal Pradesh, India)
- Independence Day (United States)
- Liberation Day (Northern Mariana Islands)
- Liberation Day (Rwanda)
- Republic Day (Philippines)
