= May 15 =

May 15 this year in various calendars
- Friday, 15 May 2026
Akan	Kwafie
Armenian	29 Mareri 1475
Aztec	Ochpaniztli 5, 9 Ācatl
Babylonian	27 Nisanu, 2337 SE
Balinese pawukon	Luang, Pepet, Beteng, Sri, Paing, Was, Sukra of Gumbreg, Sri, Jangur, Manuh
Bengali	1 Joishtho, BS 1433
Chinese	Yin Earth Ox・Bond Mansion; Fire Horse Year, Month 3, Day 29 (Lixia, 6 days until Xiaoman)
Common Era	15 May 2026 CE
Coptic	7 Pashons, AM 1742
Egyptian	29 Thoth, 2775 NE
Ethiopian	7 Genbot, 2018 Amätä Məhrät
French Republican	Décade III, Sextidi de Floréal de l'Année 234 de la République
Gregorian	15 May, AD 2026
Hebrew	28 Iyar, AM 5786; Omer 43
Hindu	Aśvinī・Ayuṣmān; Solar: 1 Jyeṣṭha, 1948 SE; Lunisolar: Trayodaśī, Kṛishna pakṣa of Vaiśākha, 2083 VE; Rāudra・5127 KY・1,872,710
Icelandic	Föstudagur, 23 Harpa 2026
Islamic	28 Dhu al-Qi'dah, AH 1447 (using tabular method)
ISO week date	2026-W20-5
Japanese	29 Yayoi, Reiwa 8 (Rikka, 6 days until Shōman)
Julian	2 May, AD 2026 (AM 7534)
Julian day	2461176
Korean	29 Yongdal, 4359 DE
Maya	13.0.13.10.13; 6 Zip, 9 Ben
Roman	ante diem VI Nonas Maias, MMDCCLXXIX AUC
Solar Hijri	25 Ordibehesht, SH 1405
Tibetan	28 nag pa, me pho rta 2153 or 1772 or 1000

<<	May					>>
Su	Mo	Tu	We	Th	Fr	Sa
					1	2
3	4	5	6	7	8	9
10	11	12	13	14	15	16
17	18	19	20	21	22	23
24	25	26	27	28	29	30
31
2026

May 15 in recent years
2026 (Friday)
2025 (Thursday)
2024 (Wednesday)
2023 (Monday)
2022 (Sunday)
2021 (Saturday)
2020 (Friday)
2019 (Wednesday)
2018 (Tuesday)
2017 (Monday)

May 15 is the 135th day of the year (136th in leap years) in the Gregorian calendar; 230 days remain until the end of the year.

== Events ==
=== Pre-1600 ===
- 221 – Liu Bei, Chinese warlord, proclaims himself emperor of Shu Han, the successor of the Han dynasty.
- 392 – Emperor Valentinian II is assassinated while advancing into Gaul against the Frankish usurper Arbogast. He is found hanging in his residence at Vienne.
- 589 – King Authari marries Theodelinda, daughter of the Bavarian duke Garibald I. A Catholic, she has great influence among the Lombard nobility.
- 756 – Abd al-Rahman I, the founder of the Arab dynasty that ruled the greater part of Iberia for nearly three centuries, becomes emir of Cordova, Spain.
- 908 – Constantine VII is crowned Byzantine co-emperor.
- 1194 – Michael the Syrian reconsecrates the Mor Bar Sauma Monastery, which he reconstructed after its destruction by a fire. The monastery stays a center of the Syriac Orthodox Church until the end of the thirteenth century.
- 1252 – Pope Innocent IV issues the papal bull ad extirpanda, which authorizes, but also limits, the torture of heretics in the Medieval Inquisition.
- 1525 – Insurgent peasants led by Anabaptist pastor Thomas Müntzer are defeated at the Battle of Frankenhausen, ending the German Peasants' War in the Holy Roman Empire.
- 1532 – The English church submits to the king of England in passing a convocation in which it surrenders a number of rights, such as to make provincial ecclesiastic laws independently of the king.
- 1536 – Anne Boleyn, Queen of England, stands trial in London on charges of treason, adultery and incest; she is condemned to death by a specially-selected jury.
- 1567 – The wedding of Mary, Queen of Scots, and the Earl of Bothwell, the chief instigator of the murder of her previous husband Lord Darnley, takes place.
- 1571 – Venice, Spain, Naples, the Papal States, and other Italian states establish the Holy League to fight the Ottomans, resulting in the victory at Lepanto later that year.

=== 1601–1900 ===
- 1602 – Cape Cod is sighted by English navigator Bartholomew Gosnold.
- 1648 – The Peace of Münster is ratified, by which Spain acknowledges Dutch sovereignty.
- 1725 – Bach leads the first performance of his cantata Ich bin ein guter Hirt, BWV 85, about Jesus as the Good Shepherd.
- 1791 – French Revolution: Maximilien Robespierre proposes the Self-denying Ordinance.
- 1836 – Francis Baily observes "Baily's beads" during an annular eclipse.
- 1849 – The Sicilian revolution of 1848 is finally extinguished.
- 1850 – The Arana–Southern Treaty is ratified, ending "the existing differences" between Great Britain and Argentina.
- 1851 – The first Australian gold rush is proclaimed, although the discovery had been made three months earlier.
- 1864 – American Civil War: Battle of New Market, Virginia: Students from the Virginia Military Institute fight alongside the Confederate army to force Union General Franz Sigel out of the Shenandoah Valley.
- 1891 – Pope Leo XIII defends workers' rights and property rights in the encyclical Rerum novarum, the beginning of modern Catholic social teaching.

=== 1901–present ===
- 1911 – In Standard Oil Co. of New Jersey v. United States, the United States Supreme Court declares Standard Oil to be an "unreasonable" monopoly under the Sherman Antitrust Act and orders the company to be broken up.
- 1911 – More than 300 Chinese immigrants are killed in the Torreón massacre when the forces of the Mexican Revolution led by Emilio Madero take the city of Torreón from the Federales.
- 1916 – A seventeen-year-old farmworker, Jesse Washington, is lynched in Waco, Texas, USA, after being convicted of rape and murder.
- 1918 – The Finnish Civil War ends when the Whites take over Fort Ino, a Russian coastal artillery base on the Karelian Isthmus, from Russian troops.
- 1919 – The Winnipeg general strike begins. By 11:00, almost the whole working population of Winnipeg had walked off the job.
- 1919 – Greek occupation of Smyrna. During the occupation, the Greek army kills or wounds 350 Turks; those responsible are punished by Greek commander Aristides Stergiades.
- 1929 – A fire at the Cleveland Clinic in Cleveland, Ohio kills 123.
- 1932 – In an attempted coup d'état, the Prime Minister of Japan, Inukai Tsuyoshi, is assassinated.
- 1933 – All military aviation organizations within or under the control of the RLM of Germany are officially merged in a covert manner to form its Wehrmacht military's air arm, the Luftwaffe.
- 1934 – A self coup by prime minister Kārlis Ulmanis succeeds in Latvia, suspending its constitution and dissolving its Saeima.
- 1940 – USS Sailfish is recommissioned. It was originally the USS Squalus.
- 1940 – World War II: The Battle of the Netherlands: After fierce fighting, the poorly trained and equipped Dutch troops surrender to Germany, marking the beginning of five years of occupation.
- 1940 – Richard and Maurice McDonald open the first McDonald's restaurant.
- 1941 – First flight of the Gloster E.28/39, the first British and Allied jet aircraft.
- 1942 – World War II: In the United States, a bill creating the Women's Army Auxiliary Corps (WAAC) is signed into law.
- 1943 – Joseph Stalin dissolves the Comintern (or Third International).
- 1945 – World War II: The Battle of Poljana, the final skirmish in Europe, is fought near Prevalje, Slovenia.
- 1948 – Following the expiration of The British Mandate for Palestine, the Kingdom of Egypt, Transjordan, Lebanon, Syria, Iraq and Saudi Arabia invade Israel, thus starting the 1948 Arab–Israeli War.
- 1957 – At Malden Island in the Pacific Ocean, Britain tests its first hydrogen bomb in Operation Grapple.
- 1963 – Project Mercury: The launch of the final Mercury mission, Mercury-Atlas 9 with astronaut Gordon Cooper on board. He becomes the first American to spend more than a day in space, and the last American to go into space alone.
- 1970 – President Richard Nixon appoints Anna Mae Hays and Elizabeth P. Hoisington as the first female United States Army generals.
- 1972 – The Ryukyu Islands, under U.S. military governance since their conquest in 1945, revert to Japanese control.
- 1974 – Ma'alot massacre: Members of the Democratic Front for the Liberation of Palestine attack and take hostages at an Israeli school; a total of 31 people are killed, including 22 schoolchildren.
- 1976 – Aeroflot Flight 1802 crashes near Viktorivka, Chernihiv Raion, Chernihiv Oblast, killing 52.
- 1988 – Soviet–Afghan War: After more than eight years of fighting, the Soviet Army begins to withdraw 115,000 troops from Afghanistan.
- 1991 – Édith Cresson becomes France's first female Prime Minister.
- 1997 – The United States government acknowledges the existence of the "Secret War" in Laos and dedicates the Laos Memorial in honor of Hmong and other "Secret War" veterans.
- 1997 – The Space Shuttle Atlantis launches on STS-84 to dock with the Russian space station Mir.
- 2001 – A CSX EMD SD40-2 8888 rolls out of a train yard in Walbridge, Ohio, with 47 freight cars, including some tank cars with flammable chemical, after its engineer fails to reboard it after setting a yard switch. It travels south driverless for 66 miles (106 km) until it is brought to a halt near Kenton. The incident became the inspiration for the 2010 film Unstoppable.
- 2004 – Arsenal F.C. go an entire league campaign unbeaten in the English Premier League, joining Preston North End F.C. with the right to claim the title "The Invincibles".
- 2008 – California becomes the second U.S. state after Massachusetts in 2004 to legalize same-sex marriage after the state's own Supreme Court rules a previous ban unconstitutional.
- 2010 – Jessica Watson becomes the youngest person to sail, non-stop and unassisted around the world solo.
- 2013 – An upsurge in violence in Iraq leaves more than 389 people dead over three days.
- 2024 – Prime Minister of Slovakia Robert Fico is shot and critically injured while meeting with supporters at an event in Handlová.

== Births ==
=== Pre-1600 ===
- 1397 – Sejong the Great, Korean king of Joseon (died 1450)
- 1531 – Maria of Austria, Duchess of Jülich-Cleves-Berg (died 1581)
- 1565 – Hendrick de Keyser, Dutch sculptor and architect (died 1621)
- 1567 – Claudio Monteverdi, Italian priest and composer (died 1643)

=== 1601–1900 ===
- 1608 – René Goupil, French-American missionary and saint (died 1642)
- 1645 – George Jeffreys, 1st Baron Jeffreys, British judge (died 1689)
- 1689 – Lady Mary Wortley Montagu, English writer (died 1762)
- 1720 – Maximilian Hell, Hungarian priest and astronomer (died 1792)
- 1749 – Levi Lincoln Sr., American lawyer and politician, 4th United States Attorney General (died 1820)
- 1759 – Maria Theresia von Paradis, Austrian pianist and composer (died 1824)
- 1770 – Ezekiel Hart, Canadian businessman and politician (died 1843)
- 1773 – Klemens von Metternich, German-Austrian politician, 1st State Chancellor of the Austrian Empire (died 1859)
- 1786 – Dimitris Plapoutas, Greek general and politician (died 1864)
- 1803 – Juan Almonte, son of José María Morelos, was a Mexican soldier and diplomat who served as a regent in the Second Mexican Empire (died 1869)
- 1805 – Samuel Carter, English railway solicitor and Member of Parliament (MP) (died 1878)
- 1808 – Michael William Balfe, Irish composer and conductor (died 1870)
- 1817 – Debendranath Tagore, Indian philosopher and author (died 1905)
- 1841 – Clarence Dutton, American commander and geologist (died 1912)
- 1845 – Élie Metchnikoff, Russian zoologist (died 1916)
- 1848 – Viktor Vasnetsov, Russian painter and illustrator (died 1926)
- 1848 – Carl Wernicke, German neuropathologist. (died 1905)
- 1854 – Ioannis Psycharis, Ukrainian-French philologist and author (died 1929)
- 1856 – L. Frank Baum, American novelist (died 1919)
- 1856 – Matthias Zurbriggen, Swiss mountaineer (died 1917)
- 1857 – Williamina Fleming, Scottish-American astronomer and academic (died 1911)
- 1859 – Pierre Curie, French physicist and academic, Nobel Prize laureate (died 1906)
- 1862 – Arthur Schnitzler, Austrian author and playwright (died 1931)
- 1863 – Frank Hornby, English businessman and politician, invented Meccano (died 1936)
- 1869 – Paul Probst, Swiss target shooter (died 1945)
- 1869 – John Storey, Australian politician, 20th Premier of New South Wales (died 1921)
- 1873 – Oskari Tokoi, Finnish socialist and the Chairman of the Senate of Finland (died 1963)
- 1882 – Walter White, Scottish international footballer (died 1950)
- 1890 – Katherine Anne Porter, American short story writer, novelist, and essayist (died 1980)
- 1891 – Mikhail Bulgakov, Russian novelist and playwright (died 1940)
- 1891 – Hjalmar Dahl, Finnish journalist, translator and writer (died 1960)
- 1891 – Fritz Feigl, Austrian-Brazilian chemist and academic (died 1971)
- 1892 – Charles E. Rosendahl, American admiral (died 1977)
- 1892 – Jimmy Wilde, Welsh boxer (died 1969)
- 1893 – José Nepomuceno, Filipino filmmaker, founder of Philippine cinema (died 1959)
- 1894 – Feg Murray, American hurdler and cartoonist (died 1973)
- 1895 – Prescott Bush, American captain, banker, and politician (died 1972)
- 1895 – William D. Byron, American lieutenant and politician (died 1941)
- 1898 – Arletty, French model, actress, and singer (died 1992)
- 1899 – Jean Étienne Valluy, French general (died 1970)
- 1900 – Ida Rhodes, American mathematician, pioneer in computer programming (died 1986)

=== 1901–present ===
- 1901 – Xavier Herbert, Australian author (died 1984)
- 1901 – Luis Monti, Argentinian-Italian footballer and manager (died 1983)
- 1902 – Richard J. Daley, American lawyer and politician, 48th Mayor of Chicago (died 1976)
- 1902 – Sigizmund Levanevsky, Soviet aircraft pilot of Polish origin (died 1937)
- 1903 – Maria Reiche, German mathematician and archaeologist (died 1998)
- 1904 – Clifton Fadiman, American game show host and author (died 1999)
- 1905 – Joseph Cotten, American actor (died 1994)
- 1905 – Albert Dubout, French cartoonist, illustrator, painter, and sculptor (died 1976)
- 1905 – Abraham Zapruder, American businessman and amateur photographer, filmed the Zapruder film (died 1970)
- 1907 – Sukhdev Thapar, Indian activist (died 1931)
- 1909 – James Mason, English actor, producer, and screenwriter (died 1984)
- 1909 – Clara Solovera, Chilean singer-songwriter (died 1992)
- 1910 – Constance Cummings, British-based American actress (died 2005)
- 1911 – Max Frisch, Swiss playwright and novelist (died 1991)
- 1911 – Herta Oberheuser, German physician (died 1978)
- 1912 – Arthur Berger, American composer and educator (died 2003)
- 1914 – Turk Broda, Canadian ice hockey player and coach (died 1972)
- 1914 – Angus MacLean, Canadian farmer and politician, 25th Premier of Prince Edward Island (died 2000)
- 1914 – Norrie Paramor, English composer, producer, and conductor (died 1979)
- 1915 – Hilda Bernstein, English-South African author and activist (died 2006)
- 1915 – Paul Samuelson, American economist and academic, Nobel Prize laureate (died 2009)
- 1915 – Henrik Sandberg, Danish production manager and producer (died 1993)
- 1916 – Vera Gebuhr, Danish actress (died 2014)
- 1918 – Eddy Arnold, American singer-songwriter, guitarist, and actor (died 2008)
- 1918 – Arthur Jackson, American lieutenant and target shooter (died 2015)
- 1918 – Joseph Wiseman, Canadian-American actor (died 2009)
- 1920 – Michel Audiard, French director and screenwriter (died 1985)
- 1921 – Federico Krutwig, Basque writer, member of ETA and translator (died 1998)
- 1922 – Sigurd Ottovich Schmidt, Russian historian and ethnographer (died 2013)
- 1922 – Jakucho Setouchi, Japanese nun and author (died 2021)
- 1923 – Richard Avedon, American sailor and photographer (died 2004)
- 1923 – John Lanchbery, English-Australian composer and conductor (died 2003)
- 1924 – Maria Koepcke, German-Peruvian ornithologist and zoologist (died 1971)
- 1925 – Andrei Eshpai, Russian pianist and composer (died 2015)
- 1925 – Mary F. Lyon, English geneticist and biologist (died 2014)
- 1925 – Carl Sanders, American soldier, pilot, and politician, 74th Governor of Georgia (died 2014)
- 1925 – Roy Stewart, Jamaican-English actor and stuntman (died 2008)
- 1926 – Clermont Pépin, Canadian pianist, composer, and educator (died 2006)
- 1926 – Anthony Shaffer, English author, playwright, and screenwriter (died 2001)
- 1926 – Peter Shaffer, English playwright and screenwriter (died 2016)
- 1930 – Jasper Johns, American painter and sculptor
- 1931 – Ken Venturi, American golfer and sportscaster (died 2013)
- 1931 – James Fitz-Allen Mitchell, Vincentian politician and agronomist, 2nd Prime Minister of Saint Vincent and the Grenadines (died 2021)
- 1935 – Don Bragg, American pole vaulter (died 2019)
- 1935 – Ted Dexter, Italian-English cricketer (died 2021)
- 1935 – Utah Phillips, American singer-songwriter and guitarist (died 2008)
- 1935 – Akihiro Miwa, Japanese singer, actor, director, composer, author and drag queen
- 1936 – Anna Maria Alberghetti, Italian-American actress and singer
- 1936 – Mart Laga, Estonian basketball player (died 1977)
- 1936 – Ralph Steadman, English painter and illustrator
- 1936 – Paul Zindel, American playwright and novelist (died 2003)
- 1937 – Madeleine Albright, Czech-American politician and diplomat, 64th United States Secretary of State (died 2022)
- 1937 – Karin Krog, Norwegian singer
- 1937 – Trini Lopez, American singer, guitarist, and actor (died 2020)
- 1938 – Mireille Darc, French actress, director, and screenwriter (died 2017)
- 1938 – Nancy Garden, American author (died 2014)
- 1938 – Diane Nash, American civil rights movement activist
- 1939 – Dorothy Shirley, English high jumper and educator
- 1940 – Roger Ailes, American businessman (died 2017)
- 1940 – Lainie Kazan, American actress and singer
- 1940 – Don Nelson, American basketball player and coach (died 2026)
- 1941 – Jaxon, American illustrator and publisher, co-founded the Rip Off Press (died 2006)
- 1942 – Lois Johnson, American singer-songwriter (died 2014)
- 1942 – Jusuf Kalla, Indonesian businessman and politician, 10th Vice President of Indonesia
- 1942 – Charles Horman, American journalist and documentary filmmaker (died 1973)
- 1942 – Doug Lowe, Australian politician, 35th Premier of Tasmania
- 1942 – K. T. Oslin, American singer-songwriter and actress (died 2020)
- 1943 – Paul Bégin, Canadian lawyer and politician
- 1943 – Freddie Perren, American songwriter, producer, and conductor (died 2004)
- 1944 – Bill Alter, American police officer and politician
- 1944 – Ulrich Beck, German sociologist and academic (died 2015)
- 1945 – Michael Dexter, English hematologist and academic
- 1945 – Jerry Quarry, American boxer (died 1999)
- 1946 – Thadeus Nguyễn Văn Lý, Vietnamese priest and activist
- 1947 – Graeham Goble, Australian singer-songwriter, guitarist and producer
- 1948 – Yutaka Enatsu, Japanese baseball player
- 1948 – Brian Eno, English singer-songwriter, keyboard player, and producer
- 1948 – Kathleen Sebelius, American politician, 44th Governor of Kansas
- 1949 – Frank L. Culbertson Jr., American captain, pilot, and astronaut
- 1949 – Robert S.J. Sparks, English geologist and academic
- 1950 – Jim Bacon, Australian politician, 41st Premier of Tasmania (died 2004)
- 1950 – Jim Simons, American golfer (died 2005)
- 1951 – Dennis Frederiksen, American singer-songwriter (died 2014)
- 1951 – Chris Ham, English political scientist and academic
- 1951 – Frank Wilczek, American mathematician and physicist, Nobel Prize laureate
- 1952 – Chazz Palminteri, American actor, director, producer, and screenwriter
- 1953 – George Brett, American baseball player and coach
- 1953 – Athene Donald, English physicist and academic
- 1953 – Mike Oldfield, English-Irish singer-songwriter, guitarist, and producer
- 1954 – Diana Liverman, English-American geographer and academic
- 1954 – Caroline Thomson, English journalist and broadcaster
- 1955 – Mohamed Brahmi, Tunisian politician (died 2013)
- 1955 – Lia Vissi, Cypriot singer-songwriter and politician
- 1956 – Andreas Loverdos, Greek lawyer and politician, Greek Minister of Labour
- 1956 – Dan Patrick, American television anchor and sportscaster
- 1956 – Kevin Greenaugh, American nuclear engineer (died 2023)
- 1957 – Meg Gardiner, American-English author and academic
- 1957 – Juan José Ibarretxe, Spanish politician
- 1957 – Kevin Von Erich, American football player and wrestler
- 1958 – Jason Graae, American musical theater actor
- 1958 – Ruth Marcus, American journalist
- 1958 – Ron Simmons, American football player and wrestler
- 1959 – Khaosai Galaxy, Thai boxer and politician
- 1959 – Luis Pérez-Sala, Spanish race car driver
- 1959 – Beverly Jo Scott, American-Belgian singer-songwriter
- 1960 – Rhonda Burchmore, Australian actress, singer, and dancer
- 1960 – Rob Bowman, American director and producer
- 1960 – R. Kuhaneswaran, Sri Lankan politician
- 1960 – Rimas Kurtinaitis, Lithuanian basketball player and coach
- 1961 – Giselle Fernández, Mexican-American television journalist.
- 1962 – Lisa Curry, Australian swimmer
- 1963 – Gavin Nebbeling, South African footballer
- 1964 – Lars Løkke Rasmussen, Danish lawyer and politician, 40th Prime Minister of Denmark
- 1965 – André Abujamra, Brazilian singer-songwriter and guitarist
- 1965 – Scott Tronc, Australian rugby league player
- 1966 – Jiří Němec, Czech footballer
- 1967 – Simen Agdestein, Norwegian chess grandmaster and football player
- 1967 – Laura Hillenbrand, American journalist and author
- 1967 – John Smoltz, American baseball player and sportscaster
- 1967 – Madhuri Dixit, Indian actress
- 1968 – Cecilia Malmström, Swedish academic and politician, 15th European Commissioner for Trade
- 1968 – Sophie Raworth, English journalist and broadcaster
- 1969 – Hideki Irabu, Japanese-American baseball player (died 2011)
- 1969 – Kari Baadstrand Sandnes, Norwegian politician
- 1969 – Emmitt Smith, American football player and sportscaster
- 1970 – Frank de Boer, Dutch footballer and manager
- 1970 – Ronald de Boer, Dutch footballer and manager
- 1970 – Desmond Howard, American football player and sportscaster
- 1970 – Alison Jackson, English photographer, director, and screenwriter
- 1970 – Rod Smith, American football player
- 1970 – Ben Wallace, English captain and politician
- 1971 – Karin Lušnic, Slovenian tennis player
- 1972 – Danny Alexander, Scottish politician, Secretary of State for Scotland
- 1972 – David Charvet, French actor and singer
- 1973 – Giles Perry, British keyboardist
- 1974 – Vasilis Kikilias, Greek basketball player and politician
- 1974 – Matthew Sadler, English chess player and author
- 1974 – Marko Tredup, German footballer and manager
- 1974 – Ahmet Zappa, American musician and writer
- 1975 – Ray Lewis, American football player and sportscaster
- 1975 – Ales Michalevic, Belarusian lawyer and politician
- 1975 – Janne Seurujärvi, Finnish Sami politician, first Sami ever to be elected to the Finnish Parliament
- 1976 – Torraye Braggs, American basketball player
- 1976 – Mark Kennedy, Irish footballer
- 1976 – Jacek Krzynówek, Polish footballer
- 1976 – Ryan Leaf, American football player and coach
- 1976 – Anže Logar, Slovenian politician
- 1976 – Tyler Walker, American baseball player
- 1978 – Amy Chow, American gymnast and pediatrician
- 1978 – Dwayne De Rosario, Canadian soccer player
- 1978 – Edu, Brazilian footballer
- 1978 – David Krumholtz, American actor
- 1979 – Adolfo Bautista, Mexican footballer
- 1979 – Daniel Caines, English sprinter
- 1979 – Chris Masoe, New Zealand rugby player
- 1979 – Ryan Max Riley, American skier
- 1979 – Robert Royal, American football player
- 1979 – Dominic Scott, Irish guitarist
- 1980 – Josh Beckett, American baseball player
- 1981 – Patrice Evra, French footballer
- 1981 – Paul Konchesky, English international footballer
- 1981 – Justin Morneau, Canadian baseball player
- 1981 – Zara Phillips, English equestrian
- 1981 – Jamie-Lynn Sigler, American actress and singer
- 1982 – Veronica Campbell-Brown, Jamaican sprinter
- 1982 – Segundo Castillo, Ecuadorian footballer
- 1982 – Rafael Pérez, Dominican baseball player
- 1982 – Layal Abboud, Lebanese singer
- 1984 – Jeff Deslauriers, Canadian ice hockey player
- 1984 – Sérgio Jimenez, Brazilian race car driver
- 1984 – Samantha Noble, Australian actress
- 1984 – Beau Scott, Australian rugby league player
- 1984 – Mr Probz, Dutch singer, songwriter, rapper, actor and record producer
- 1985 – Cristiane, Brazilian footballer
- 1985 – Tania Cagnotto, Italian diver
- 1985 – Laura Harvey, English football coach
- 1985 – Tathagata Mukherjee, Indian actor
- 1985 – Denis Onyango, Ugandan football goalkeeper
- 1985 – Justine Robbeson, South African javelin thrower
- 1986 – Thomas Brown, American football player
- 1986 – Matías Fernández, Chilean footballer
- 1986 – Adam Moffat, Scottish footballer
- 1987 – David Adams, American baseball player
- 1987 – Michael Brantley, American baseball player
- 1987 – Brian Dozier, American baseball player
- 1987 – Mark Fayne, American ice hockey player
- 1987 – Ersan İlyasova, Turkish basketball player
- 1987 – Leonardo Mayer, Argentinian tennis player
- 1987 – Andy Murray, Scottish tennis player
- 1988 – Indrek Kajupank, Estonian basketball player
- 1988 – Scott Laird, English footballer
- 1989 – Susan Soonkyu Lee, Korean-American singer and entertainer
- 1989 – Mapou Yanga-Mbiwa, French footballer
- 1990 – Jordan Eberle, Canadian ice hockey player
- 1990 – Lee Jong-hyun, Korean guitarist
- 1990 – Stella Maxwell, New Zealand model
- 1993 – Jeremy Hawkins, New Zealand rugby league player
- 1993 – Tomáš Kalas, Czech international footballer
- 1996 – Birdy, English singer-songwriter
- 1997 – Ousmane Dembélé, French footballer
- 1997 – Scott Drinkwater, Australian rugby league player
- 1998 – Lucrezia Stefanini, Italian tennis player
- 1999 – Anastasia Gasanova, Russian tennis player
- 2000 – Dayana Yastremska, Ukrainian tennis player
- 2002 – Chase Hudson, American internet celebrity, singer, actor
- 2006 – Haerin, Korean singer

== Deaths ==
=== Pre-1600 ===
- 392 – Valentinian II, Roman emperor (born 371)
- 558 – Hilary of Galeata, Christian monk (born 476)
- 884 – Marinus I, pope of the Catholic Church (born 830)
- 913 – Hatto I, German archbishop (born 850)
- 926 – Zhuang Zong, Chinese emperor (born 885)
- 973 – Byrhthelm, bishop of Wells
- 1036 – Go-Ichijō, emperor of Japan (born 1008)
- 1157 – Yuri Dolgorukiy, Grand Prince of Kiev (born 1099)
- 1175 – Mleh, prince of Armenia
- 1174 – Nur ad-Din, Seljuk emir of Syria (born 1118)
- 1268 – Peter II, count of Savoy (born 1203)
- 1461 – Domenico Veneziano, Italian painter (born c. 1410)
- 1464 – Henry Beaufort, 3rd Duke of Somerset (born 1436)
- 1470 – Charles VIII, king of Sweden (born 1409)
- 1585 – Niwa Nagahide, Japanese samurai (born 1535)

=== 1601–1900 ===
- 1609 – Giovanni Croce, Italian composer and educator (born 1557)
- 1615 – Henry Bromley, English politician (born 1560)
- 1634 – Hendrick Avercamp, Dutch painter (born 1585)
- 1698 – Marie Champmeslé, French actress (born 1642)
- 1699 – Sir Edward Petre, 3rd Baronet, English politician (born 1631)
- 1700 – John Hale, American minister (born 1636)
- 1740 – Ephraim Chambers, English publisher (born 1680)
- 1773 – Alban Butler, English priest and hagiographer (born 1710)
- 1845 – Braulio Carrillo Colina, Costa Rican lawyer and politician, Head of State of Costa Rica (born 1800)
- 1879 – Gottfried Semper, German architect and educator, designed the Semper Opera House (born 1803)
- 1886 – Emily Dickinson, American poet and author (born 1830)

=== 1901–present ===
- 1914 – Ida Freund, Austrian-born chemist and educator (born 1863)
- 1919 – Hasan Tahsin, Turkish journalist (born 1888)
- 1924 – Paul-Henri-Benjamin d'Estournelles de Constant, French diplomat and politician, Nobel Prize laureate (born 1852)
- 1926 – Joseph James Fletcher, Australian biologist (born 1850)
- 1928 – Umegatani Tōtarō I, Japanese sumo wrestler, the 15th Yokozuna (born 1845)
- 1935 – Kazimir Malevich, Ukrainian-Russian painter and theoretician (born 1878)
- 1937 – Philip Snowden, 1st Viscount Snowden, English politician, Chancellor of the Exchequer (born 1864)
- 1945 – Kenneth J. Alford, English soldier, bandmaster, and composer (born 1881)
- 1945 – Charles Williams, English author, poet, and critic (born 1886)
- 1948 – Edward J. Flanagan, Irish-American priest, founded Boys Town (born 1886)
- 1954 – William March, American soldier and author (born 1893)
- 1955 – Harry J. Capehart, American lawyer, politician, and businessperson (born 1881)
- 1956 – Austin Osman Spare, English painter and magician (born 1886)
- 1957 – Keith Andrews, American race car driver (born 1920)
- 1957 – Dick Irvin, Canadian ice hockey player and coach (born 1892)
- 1963 – John Aglionby, English-born Bishop of Accra and soldier (born 1884)
- 1964 – Vladko Maček, Croatian lawyer and politician (born 1879)
- 1965 – Pio Pion, Italian businessman (born 1887)
- 1967 – Edward Hopper, American painter (born 1882)
- 1967 – Italo Mus, Italian painter (born 1892)
- 1969 – Joe Malone, Canadian ice hockey player (born 1890)
- 1971 – Tyrone Guthrie, English director, producer, and playwright (born 1900)
- 1978 – Robert Menzies, Australian lawyer and politician, 12th Prime Minister of Australia (born 1894)
- 1980 – Gordon Prange, American historian and author (born 1910)
- 1982 – Gordon Smiley, American race car driver (born 1946)
- 1984 – Francis Schaeffer, American pastor, theologian, and philosopher (born 1912)
- 1985 – Jackie Curtis, American actress and writer (born 1947)
- 1986 – Elio de Angelis, Italian race car driver (born 1958)
- 1986 – Theodore H. White, American historian, journalist, and author (born 1915)
- 1989 – Johnny Green, American composer and conductor (born 1908)
- 1989 – Luc Lacourcière, Canadian ethnographer and author (born 1910)
- 1991 – Andreas Floer, German mathematician and academic (born 1956)
- 1991 – Amadou Hampâté Bâ, Malian ethnologist and author (born 1901)
- 1991 – Fritz Riess, German race car driver (born 1922)
- 1993 – Salah Ahmed Ibrahim, Sudanese poet and diplomat (born 1933)
- 1994 – Gilbert Roland, American actor (born 1905)
- 1995 – Eric Porter, English actor (born 1928)
- 1996 – Charles B. Fulton, American lawyer and judge (born 1910)
- 1998 – Earl Manigault, American basketball player (born 1944)
- 1998 – Naim Talu, Turkish economist, banker, politician, 15th Prime Minister of Turkey (born 1919)
- 2003 – June Carter Cash, American singer-songwriter, guitarist, and actress (born 1929)
- 2006 – Nizar Abdul Zahra, Iraqi footballer (born 1961)
- 2007 – Jerry Falwell, American pastor, founded Liberty University (born 1933)
- 2008 – Tommy Burns, Scottish footballer and manager (born 1956)
- 2008 – Alexander Courage, American composer and conductor (born 1919)
- 2008 – Will Elder, American illustrator (born 1921)
- 2009 – Bud Tingwell, Australian actor, director, and producer (born 1923)
- 2009 – Wayman Tisdale, American basketball player and bass player (born 1964)
- 2010 – Besian Idrizaj, Austrian footballer (born 1987)
- 2010 – Loris Kessel, Swiss race car driver (born 1950)
- 2012 – Carlos Fuentes, Mexican novelist and essayist (born 1928)
- 2012 – Arno Lustiger, German historian and author (born 1924)
- 2012 – Zakaria Mohieddin, Egyptian soldier and politician, 33rd Prime Minister of Egypt (born 1918)
- 2013 – Henrique Rosa, Bissau-Guinean politician, President of Guinea-Bissau (born 1946)
- 2014 – Jean-Luc Dehaene, French-Belgian politician, 63rd Prime Minister of Belgium (born 1940)
- 2014 – Noribumi Suzuki, Japanese director and screenwriter (born 1933)
- 2015 – Elisabeth Bing, German-American physical therapist and author (born 1914)
- 2015 – Jackie Brookner, American sculptor and educator (born 1945)
- 2015 – Flora MacNeil, Scottish Gaelic singer (born 1928)
- 2015 – Garo Yepremian, Cypriot-American football player (born 1944)
- 2016 – Jelesko Grancharoff, Bulgarian-Australian resistance fighter and anarchist (born 1925)
- 2017 – Herbert R. Axelrod American tropical fish expert, publisher of pet books, and entrepreneur (born 1927)
- 2020 – Fred Willard, American actor, comedian, and writer (born 1933)
- 2021 – Oliver Gillie, British journalist and scientist (born 1937)
- 2022 – Frank Curry, Australian rugby league player and coach (born 1950)
- 2022 – Kay Mellor, English actress (born 1951)
- 2024 – Kamla Beniwal, Indian politician (born 1927)
- 2025 – Robert Walls, Australian footballer, coach, and sportscaster (born 1950)

== Holidays and observances ==
- Aoi Matsuri (Kyoto)
- Army Day (Slovenia)
- Christian feast day:
  - Achillius of Larissa
  - Athanasius of Alexandria (Coptic Church)
  - Hallvard Vebjørnsson (Roman Catholic Church)
  - Hilary of Galeata
  - Isidore the Laborer, celebrated with festivals in various countries, the beginning of bullfighting season in Madrid.
  - Jean-Baptiste de La Salle (Roman Catholic Church)
  - Kaleb of Axum
  - Peter, Andrew, Paul, and Denise (Roman Catholic Church)
  - Reticius (Roman Catholic Church)
  - Sophia of Rome (Roman Catholic church)
  - May 15 (Eastern Orthodox liturgical calendar)
- Constituent Assembly Day (Lithuania)
- Independence Day (Paraguay), celebrates the independence of Paraguay from Spain in 1811. Celebrations for the anniversary of the independence begin on Flag Day, May 14.
- International Conscientious Objectors Day
- International Day of Families (International)
- La Corsa dei Ceri begins on the eve of the feast day of Saint Ubaldo. (Gubbio)
- Mother's Day (Paraguay)
- Nakba Day (Palestinian communities)
- Peace Officers Memorial Day (United States)
- Republic Day (Lithuania)
- Teachers' Day (Colombia, Mexico, and South Korea)
