= Vera Leth =

Greenlandic civil servant

2nd County Council Ombudsman for the Parliament of Greenland
- In office 1 February 1997 – 31 July 2023
- Prime Minister: Lars-Emil Johansen
- Preceded by: Emil Abelsen
- Succeeded by: Gedion Jeremiassen

Personal details
- Born: Vera Amatsiak Jensen; July 4, 1958 (age 68) Qutdligssat, Greenland
- Spouse: Henrik Leth
- Education: University of Copenhagen

Vera Leth (born 4 July 1958) is a Greenlandic civil servant who was the County Council Ombudsman for the Parliament of Greenland between 1997 and 2023.

== Career ==
Vera Amatsiak Leth (née Jensen) was born on 4 July 1958 in Qutdligssat, Greenland. She attended the University of Copenhagen, where she earned a law degree in 1988. Leth then spent the following two and a half years working at a law firm, before working on business legislation. In 1996, Otto Steenholdt proposed Leth as the successor to Emil Abelsen as the Ombudsman of the Parliament. The Parliament voted unanimously for Leth to undertake the position, becoming the second person to hold the post. In 2001, Leth was critical of the appointment of Jens-Kristian Kleist as the priest for Greenlanders in Denmark. This was regarding the way in which the Directorate for Culture, Education, Research and Church had dealt with Kleist, regarding the lack of housing for him in Denmark.

At an extraordinary meeting held on 8 April 2013, her tenure as Ombudsman was extended by the Parliament or a further four years. Later that year, she investigated the hiring of Carsten Frank Hansen as head of the Ministry of Finance and Home Affairs, following the revaltion of his firing from his two previous positions in Denmark and his relationship with former Prime Minister of Greenland, Lars-Emil Johansen.

Leth was reelected for several further periods. However, after having upheld the position for more than a quarter of a century, on 1 August 2023, she was succeeded by Gedion Jeremiassen.
