= Elizabeth P. Hoisington =

20th-century United States Armed Forces officer

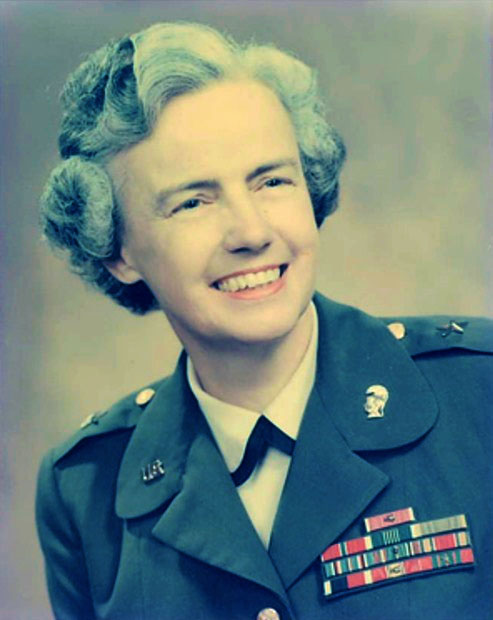
- Brigadier General Hoisington as Director of the Women's Army Corps, circa 1970
- Born: November 3, 1918; Newton, Kansas
- Died: August 21, 2007 (aged 88); Springfield, Virginia
- Burial place: Arlington National Cemetery
- Relatives: Colonel Perry M. Hoisington (grandfather); Colonel Gregory Hoisington (father); Major General Perry M. Hoisington II (brother)
- Military career
- Allegiance: United States
- Branch: United States Army
- Service years: 1942–1971
- Rank: Brigadier general
- Commands: Women's Army Corps
- Conflicts: World War II
- Awards: Army Distinguished Service Medal; Legion of Merit (2); Bronze Star Medal

Elizabeth Paschel Hoisington (November 3, 1918 – August 21, 2007) was a United States Army officer who was one of the first two women to attain the rank of brigadier general.

== Early life ==
Born in Newton, Kansas, on November 3, 1918, Elizabeth Hoisington was a 1940 graduate of the College of Notre Dame of Maryland.

== Military career ==
During World War II the United States Army expanded opportunities for women beyond nursing by creating the Women's Army Auxiliary Corps (WAAC). Hoisington enlisted in the WAACs in November 1942 and completed her basic training at Fort Des Moines, Iowa. At the time, women were required to serve in units before they could apply to Officer Candidate School (OCS), so Private Hoisington went to a WAAC aircraft early warning unit in Bangor, Maine. The company commander recognized her talents and made her the first sergeant soon after her arrival. She later said that she then sought out the most grizzled male first sergeant she could find and asked him to teach her what she needed to know. She said that he did such a good job that when she reached OCS she never had to open a book.

Hoisington was commissioned in May 1943 as a WAAC third officer. When the auxiliary became the Women's Army Corps (WAC) a month later, its officers changed to standard army ranks, and Hoisington became a second lieutenant. She deployed to Europe, serving in France after D-Day. Hoisington continued her career after World War II and advanced through the ranks to colonel as she commanded WAC units in Japan, Germany, and France and served in staff assignments in San Francisco and at the Pentagon.

Hoisington was appointed the seventh director of the Women's Army Corps on August 1, 1965, and served from 1966 to 1971. As director during the Vietnam War she visited WACs serving in Saigon and Long Binh in September, 1967. According to some sources, Hoisington discouraged sending army women to Vietnam because she believed the controversy would deter progress in expanding the overall role of women in the army.

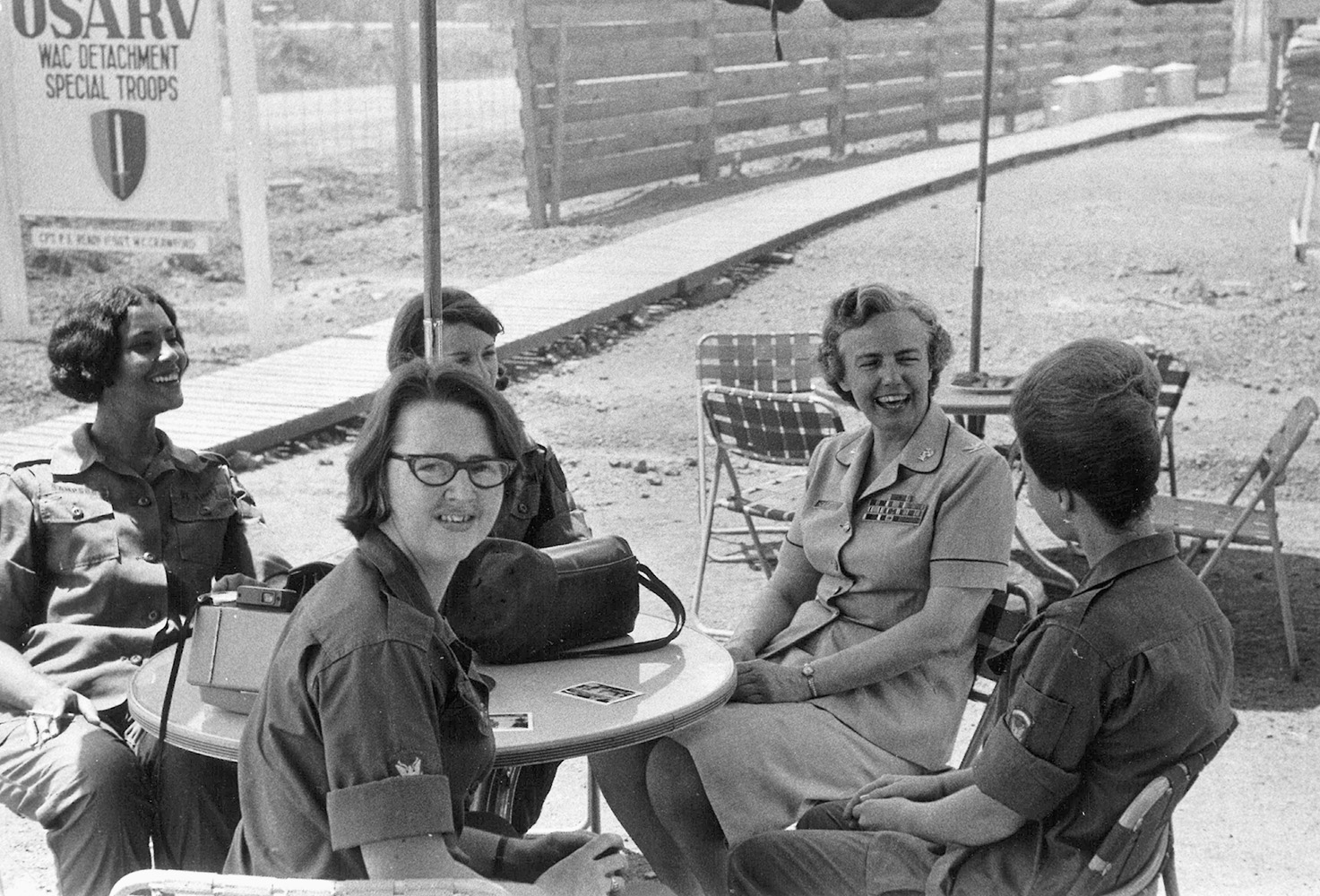
Col. Elizabeth P. Hoisington visits with members of the WAC Detachment, Vietnam, in the unit's courtyard at Long Binh, October 1967.

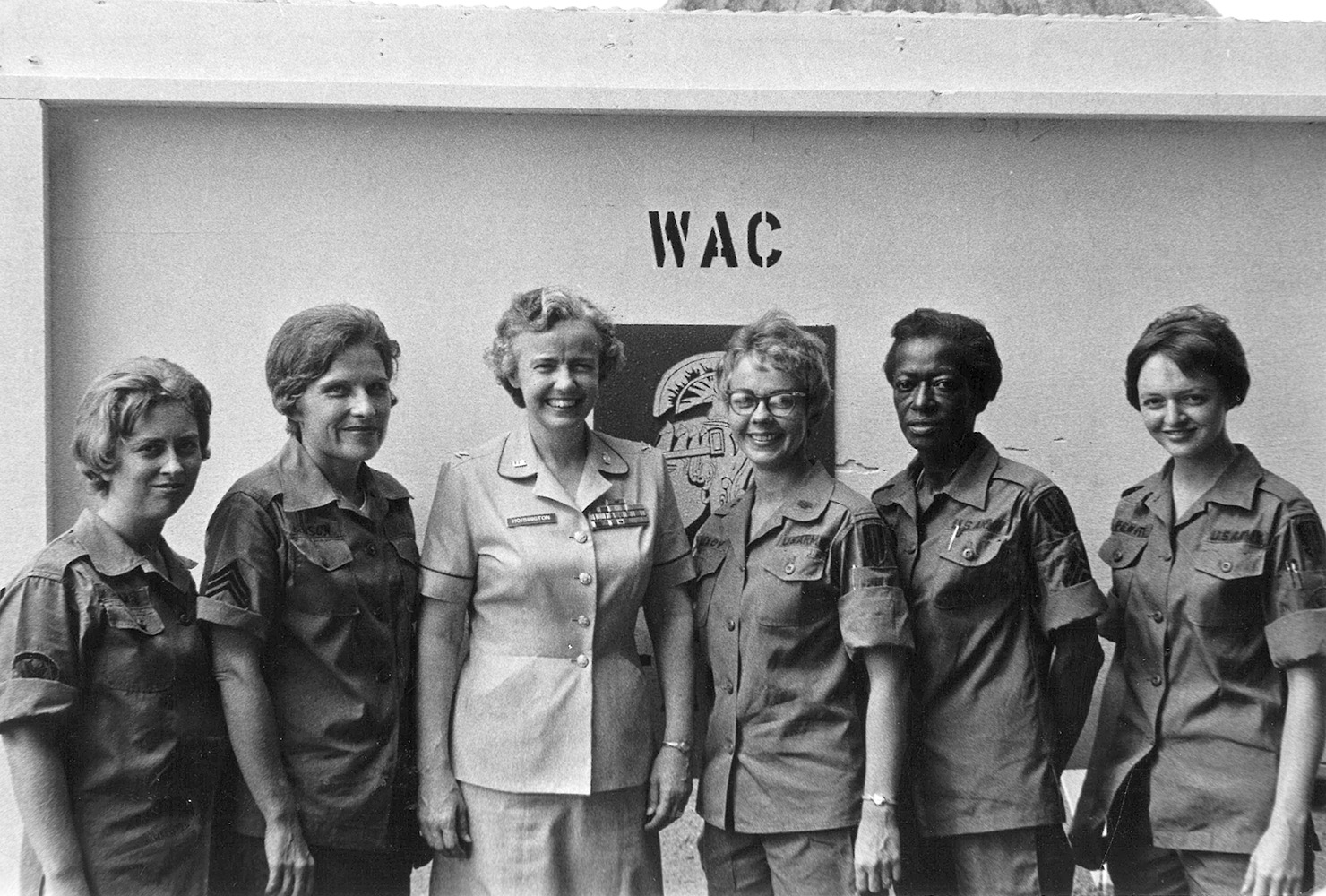
Col. Hoisington meets cadre members of the WAC Detachment, Vietnam, October 1967. Left to right: Sp4c. Rhynell M. Stoabs, Sgt. 1st Cl. Betty J. Benson, Col. Hoisington, Capt. Peggy E. Ready, SSgt. Edith L. Efferson, and Pfc. Patricia C. Pewitt.

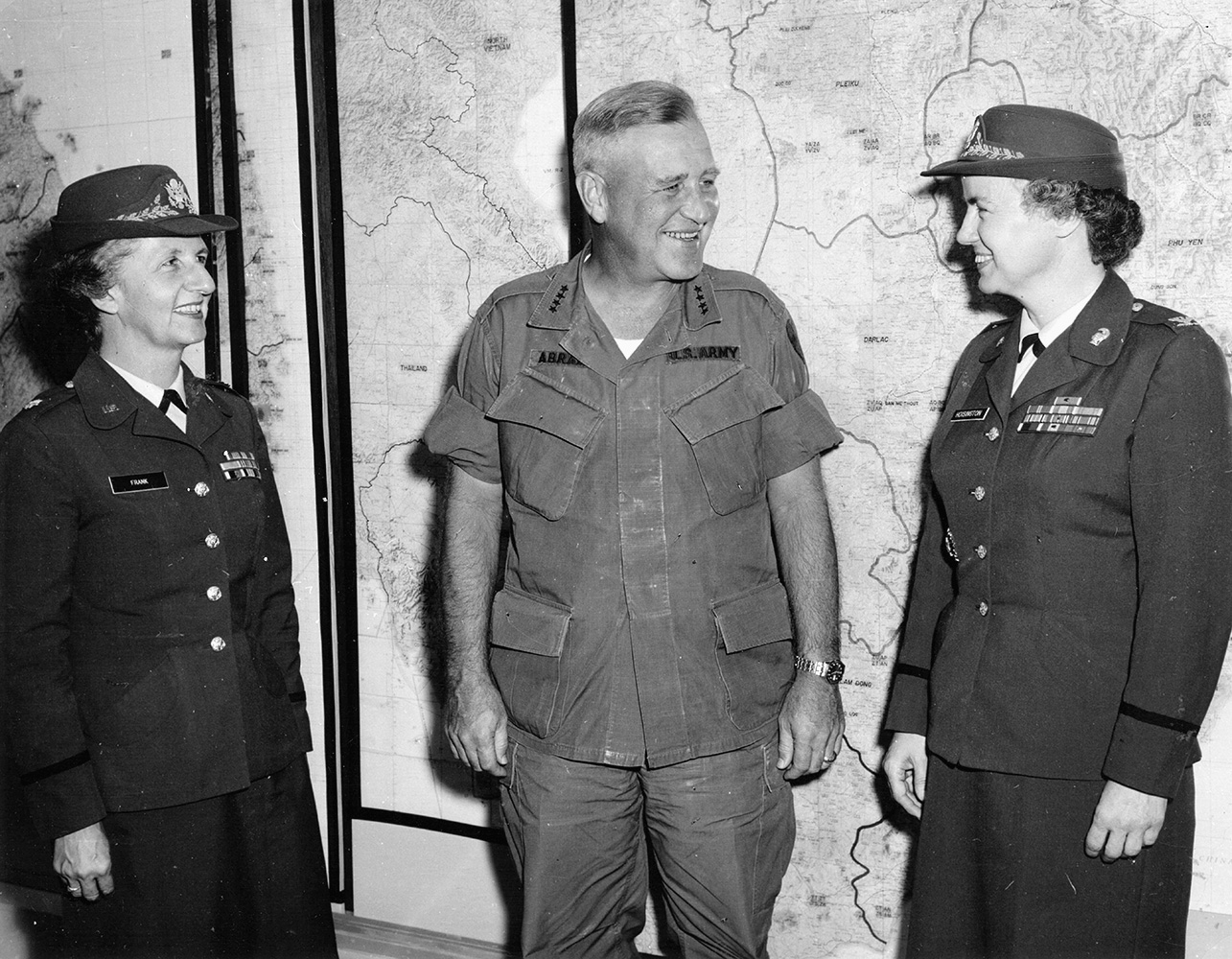
Upon arriving in Vietnam to inspect WAC units and personnel, Col. Hoisington and her escort, Lt. Col. Leta M. Frank, WAC Staff Adviser, U.S. Army, Pacific, are welcomed by Gen. Creighton W. Abrams, Deputy Commander, MACV, 21 September 1967.

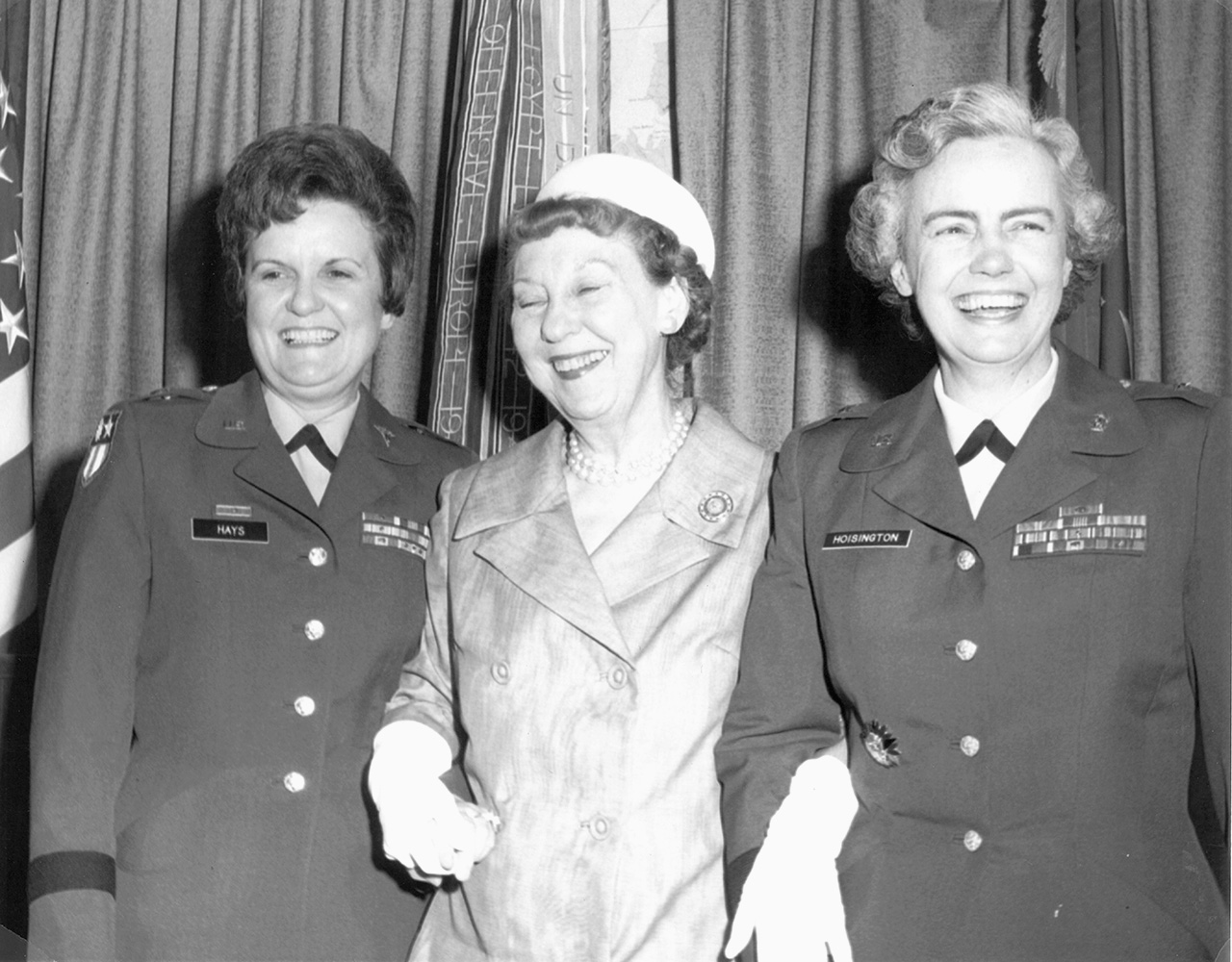
The first two military women to achieve general officer rank, Brig. Gen. Anna Mae Hays, Chief of the Army Nurse Corps (left), and Brig. Gen. Elizabeth P. Hoisington, Director, WAC (right), with Mamie Eisenhower on their promotion day, 11 June 1970.

On May 15, 1970, President Nixon announced the first women selected for promotion to brigadier general: Anna Mae Hays, Chief of the Army Nurse Corps, and Hoisington. The two women were promoted on June 11. Hays and Hoisington were promoted within minutes of each other. Because they were promoted in alphabetical order, Hays was the first woman in the United States Armed Forces to wear the insignia of a brigadier general. The Hoisington and Hays promotions resulted in positive public relations for the army, including appearances on the Dick Cavett, David Frost and Today shows. Hoisington, who was noted for her quick smile and ebullient personality, also appeared as a mystery guest on the popular game show What's My Line?

Hoisington retired from the army on August 1, 1971.

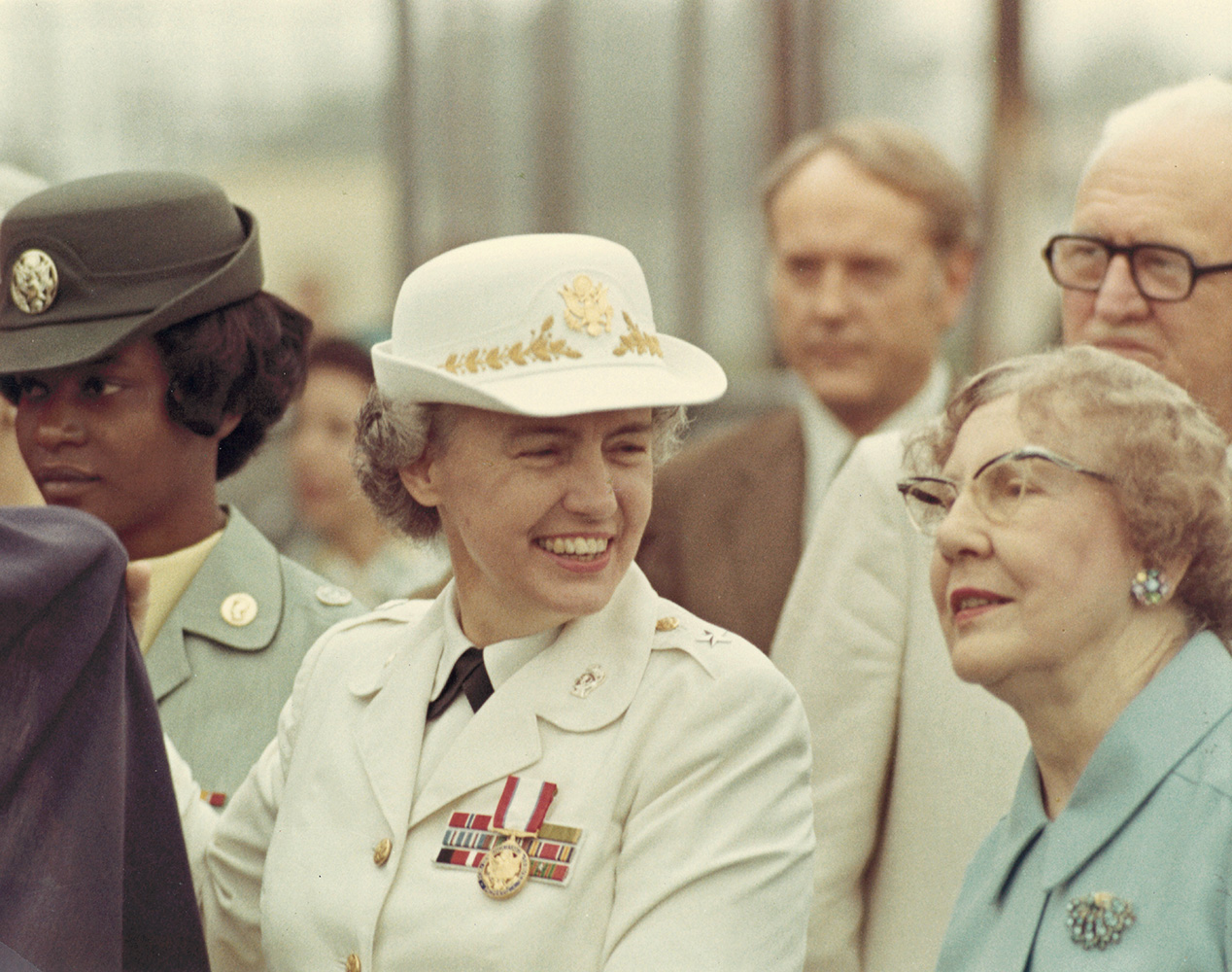
Hoisington shares a moment with her mother at her retirement review, 30 July 1971

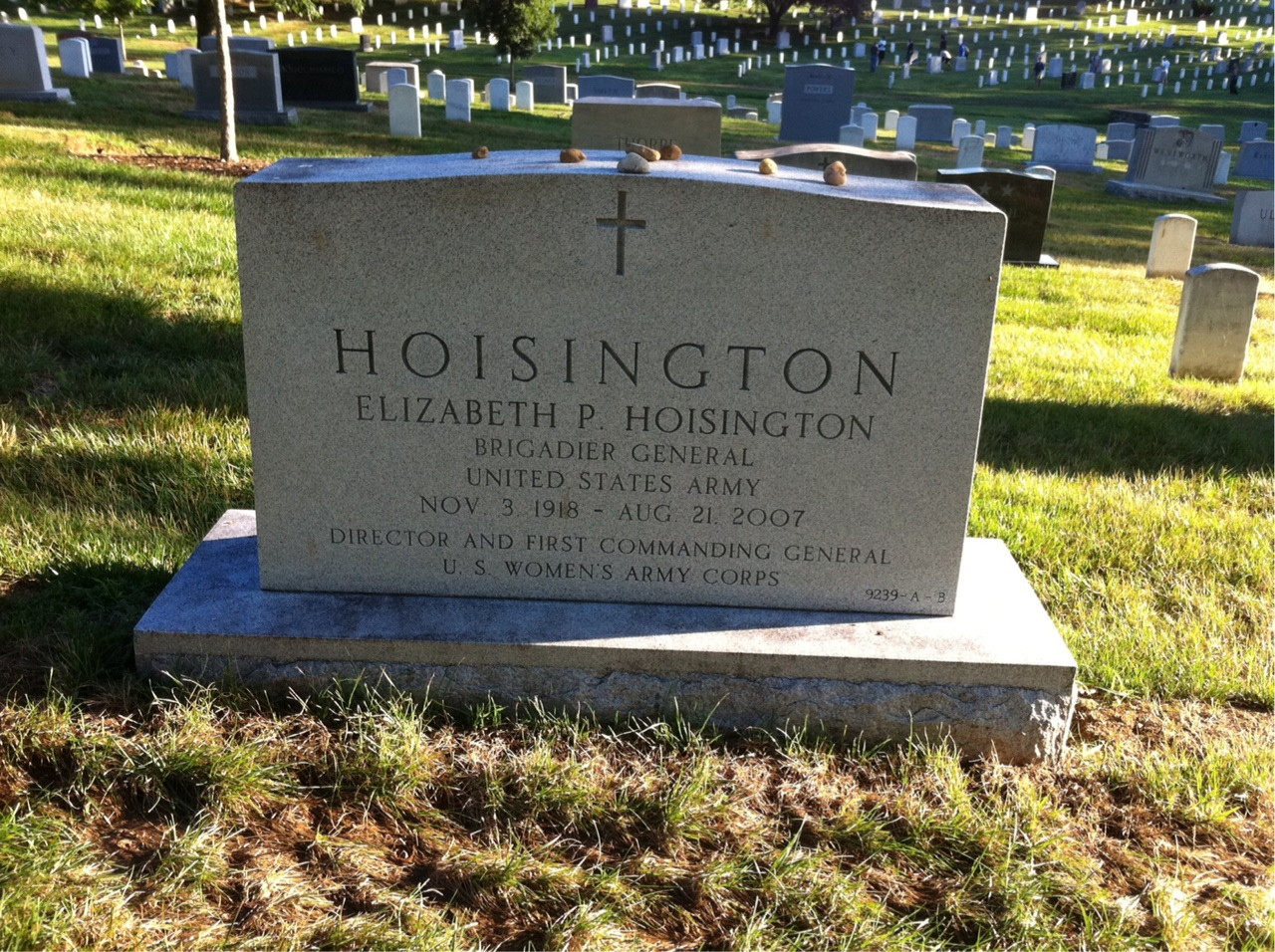
Grave at Arlington National Cemetery

== Family ==
Hoisington's grandfather, Colonel Perry Milo Hoisington I, helped to organize the Kansas National Guard. Her father, Gregory Hoisington, was a graduate of West Point and a colonel in the army. He was a direct descendant of Ebenezer Hoisington, a founder of the state of Vermont and a soldier in the American Revolution.

Hoisington's brother, Perry Hoisington II, was a United States Air Force general. Elizabeth Hoisington's 1970 promotion made them the first brother and sister generals in the United States military.

== Death and burial ==
Hoisington died in Springfield, Virginia, on August 21, 2007, at the age of 88. She is buried at Arlington National Cemetery. She was survived by a younger brother, Robert (d. 2020), and a sister, Nancy (d. 2012).

== Decorations ==

1st Row	Army Distinguished Service Medal		Legion of Merit w/ Oak Leaf Cluster
2nd Row	Bronze Star Medal	Army Commendation Medal	Women's Army Corps Service Medal
3rd Row	American Campaign Medal	European-African-Middle Eastern Campaign Medal w/ one service star	World War II Victory Medal
4th Row	Army of Occupation Medal	National Defense Service Medal w/ Oak Leaf Cluster	Croix de guerre 1939–1945 (France) w/ Star

== See also ==
- List of female United States military generals and flag officers
