= Fritz Wilde =

German footballer and manager

Personal information
- Date of birth: 4 July 1920
- Place of birth: German Reich
- Date of death: 25 August 1976 (aged 56)
- Place of death: West Germany
- Position: Forward

Senior career*
Years	Team	Apps	(Gls)
1937–1945	SCC Berlin		
1945–1946	SpVgg Fürth		
1946	FC St. Pauli		
1947–1950	1. FC 1901 Bamberg		
1950–1957	Tennis Borussia Berlin		

Managerial career
- 1962–1964: Tennis Borussia Berlin
- * Club domestic league appearances and goals

Fritz Wilde (4 July 1920 – 25 August 1977) was a German football player and manager, who played as a forward.
