= Viktorivka, Chernihiv Raion, Chernihiv Oblast =

Coordinates: 51°17′40″N 31°24′18″E

- Interactive map of Viktorivka, Chernihiv Raion, Chernihiv Oblast
- Postal code: 15564
- Area code: +380 462

Viktorovka (Ukrainian: Ві́кторівка) is a village located in Chernihiv Raion, Chernihiv Oblast, Ukraine. It belongs to Ivanivka rural hromada, one of the hromadas of Ukraine. The population is 112 people.

KOATUU code: 7425588302.

== Power ==
Local Government - Slobodsky Village Council. Mailing address: 15564, Chernigov region, Chernigov district, p. Sloboda, st. Friendship, 76.
