= Anna Mae Hays =

20th-century United States Armed Forces officer

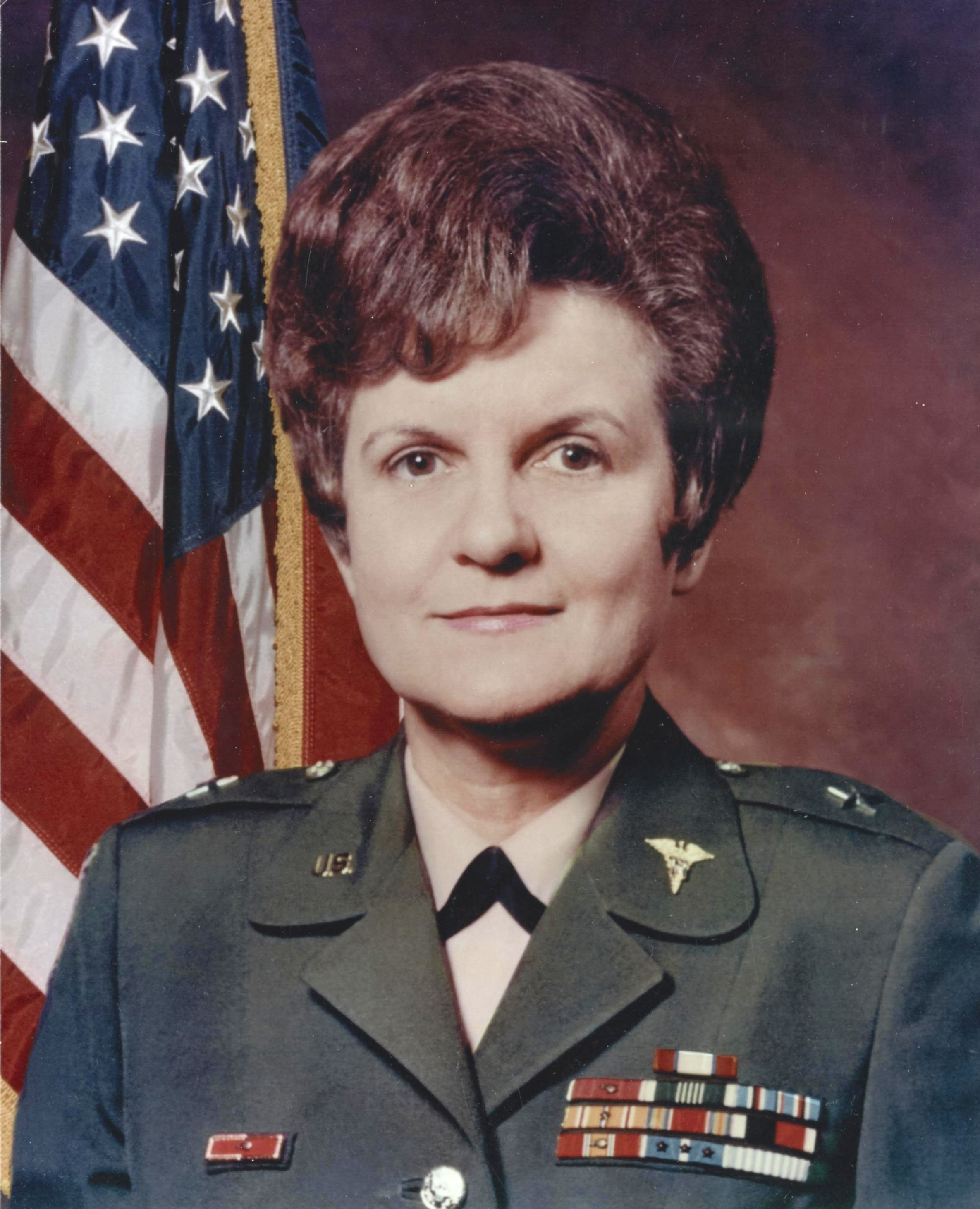
- Hays in the 1970s
- Born: Anna Mae Violet McCabe; February 16, 1920; Buffalo, New York, U.S.
- Died: January 7, 2018 (aged 97); Washington, D.C., U.S.
- Burial place: Grandview Cemetery
- Spouse: William Hays (until 1962; his death)
- Military career
- Allegiance: United States
- Branch: United States Army
- Service years: 1942–1971
- Rank: Brigadier general
- Commands: United States Army Nurse Corps
- Conflicts: World War II; Korean War
- Awards: Army Distinguished Service Medal; Legion of Merit (2); Army Commendation Medal

Anna Mae Violet Hays (née McCabe; February 16, 1920 – January 7, 2018) was an American military officer who served as the 13th chief of the United States Army Nurse Corps. She was the first woman in the United States Armed Forces to be promoted to a general officer rank; in 1970, she was promoted to brigadier general. Hays paved the way for equal treatment of women, countered occupational sexism, and made a number of recommendations which were accepted into military policy.

== Early life and education ==
McCabe was born on February 16, 1920, in Buffalo, New York, the middle of three children. Her father was Daniel Joseph McCabe (1881–1939), and her mother was the former Matie Florence Humphrey (1885–1961), who was of Welsh descent; both her parents were officers of The Salvation Army. Her elder brother was Daniel Joseph II, and her younger sister was Catherine Evangeline.

During her childhood, the McCabe family moved several times in Western New York and the Lehigh Valley region of eastern Pennsylvania, ultimately settling in Allentown, Pennsylvania in 1932 when she was about 12 years old. Hays attended Allentown High School, now William Allen High School, graduating with honors in 1938. Hays had a love of music, playing the piano, the organ, and the French horn and wanted to attend Juilliard School to study music, but due to a lack of funds for tuition she decided to pursue nursing instead. Hays enrolled at the Allentown General Hospital School of Nursing in 1939, graduating in 1941 with a diploma in nursing.

Later in her career, she earned a bachelor's degree in nursing education in 1958 from Columbia University in New York City and a Master of Science in Nursing degree in 1968 from Catholic University of America in Washington, D.C.

== Career ==
=== India ===
In May 1942, she joined the Army Nurse Corps, and was sent to India in January 1943 during World War II. She served with the 20th Field Hospital in Ledo in the northeastern region of Assam.

The hospital was stationed at the entrance to Ledo Road, which cut through jungles into Burma. The living and working conditions were primitive; buildings were made of bamboo, and dysentery, leeches and snakes were common, particularly during monsoon seasons. Just over two years later, in April 1945, she was promoted to first lieutenant.

After serving two and a half years in India, Hays was on leave in the United States when World War II ended. Remaining with the Corps, she served as an operating room nurse and later as a head nurse at Tilton General Hospital at Fort Dix, New Jersey; as obstetrics supervisor at Valley Forge General Hospital in Phoenixville, Pennsylvania, and as a head nurse at Fort Myer in Virginia.

=== Korea ===
In August 1950, she was deployed to Inchon to serve in the Korean War. She was posted to the 4th Field Hospital for seven months, and later described the conditions in the hospital there as worse than those in India in World War II, due to the cold temperatures in the operating room and a lack of supplies.

During the next fourteen months, she and 31 other nurses treated more than 25,000 patients. As she had done in India, Hays spent some of her off-duty time in Korea assisting chaplains by playing a field pump organ for church services, some of which were held on the front lines. Following her tour in Korea, Hays was transferred to Tokyo Army Hospital in April 1951 and served a year there. A year later, she was transferred to Fort Indiantown Gap, Pennsylvania, as an obstetric and pediatric director.

After graduating from the Nursing Service Administration Course at Fort Sam Houston in San Antonio, Texas, she was appointed head nurse at the Walter Reed Hospital in Washington D.C. emergency room, where she served as the head nurse of the Radioisotope Clinic. During this time she was selected as one of three private nurses for President Dwight D. Eisenhower after he became ill with ileitis; on her retirement she said that this experience was one of the most memorable of her nursing career.

In October 1960, she became the chief nurse of the 11th Evacuation Hospital in Pusan. From 1963 to 1966, she was assistant chief of the Army Nurse Corps. In July 1967, she was promoted to the rank of Colonel, and on September 1 of the same year she was appointed chief of the Corps, a position she held until her retirement on August 31, 1971.

During the Vietnam War, Hays travelled to Vietnam three times to monitor American nurses stationed there. She also managed the development of new training programs and an increase in the number of nurses serving overseas.

On May 15, 1970, President Richard Nixon appointed Hays to the rank of brigadier general and on June 11, 1970, she was promoted at a ceremony, officiated by the Army Chief of Staff, General William C. Westmoreland, and the Secretary of the Army, Stanley R. Resor. Following Hays' promotion, Elizabeth P. Hoisington, Director of the Women's Army Corps, was also promoted to the rank of brigadier general. Hays said in her address to the gathering, that the general stars "reflect[ed] the dedicated, selfless, and often heroic efforts of Army nurses throughout the world since 1901 in time of peace and war."

After her appointment she asked to be dropped off at the army officers' club front entrance, countering the prevailing occupational sexism. Although entitled to enter and use the club before, female officers were expected to come through the side entrance.

Hays made a number of recommendations regarding the treatment of women, which were accepted into military policy, including not automatically discharging who became pregnant and not determining appointments to the Army Nurse Corps Reserve based on the age of a nurse's dependents. In addition, regulations were changed to allow spouses of female service members to claim similar privileges to spouses of male service members.

=== Recognition ===
In addition to the military honors Hays received, her service was also recognized in her native Lehigh Valley; in 2015, Lehigh and Northampton counties named the Coplay-Northampton Bridge in her honor. In 2012, she was named to Lehigh County's Hall of Fame. In November 2017, she was presented with a Flag of Valor quilt during a Veterans Day ceremony at Knollwood.

In June 2020, Allentown School District in Allentown, Pennsylvania named one of Allentown's 15 elementary schools in her honor. The elementary school, Brigadier General Anna Mae Hays Elementary School. Completed in August 2020, Brigadier General Anna Mae Hays Elementary School is located at 1227 West Gordon Street in Allentown.

== Personal life ==
In July 1956, she married William A. Hays, who directed the Sheltered Workshops that provided jobs for disabled people in Washington D.C. William Hays died in 1962.

== Death ==
Hays died at Knollwood Retirement Facility in Washington, D.C., on January 7, 2018, at age 97, from complications of a heart attack.

Three days later, Pennsylvania governor Tom Wolf ordered the state flag at the Pennsylvania State Capitol in Harrisburg and at all state facilities in Allentown to fly at half staff in honor to her death.

Hays was eligible to buried at Arlington National Cemetery, but had chosen instead to be buried with her parents in Grandview Cemetery in South Whitehall Township, Pennsylvania in her native Lehigh County, Pennsylvania.

== Decorations ==

1st Row	Army Distinguished Service Medal		Legion of Merit w/ oak leaf cluster
2nd Row	Army Commendation Medal	Meritorious Unit Commendation w/ oak leaf cluster	American Campaign Medal
3rd Row	Asiatic-Pacific Campaign Medal w/ one bronze service star	World War II Victory Medal	Army of Occupation Medal
4th Row	National Defense Service Medal w/ OLC	Korean Service Medal w/ three service stars	United Nations Korea Medal

== See also ==
- List of female United States military generals and flag officers
- Timeline of women in warfare in the United States from 1900 to 1949
- Women in the military
- Women in the military in the Americas

== Bibliography ==
- Frank, Lisa Tendrich (2013). An Encyclopedia of American Women at War: From the Home Front to the Battlefields (Illustrated ed.). ABC-CLIO. ISBN 978-1-5988-4444-3.
- Witt, Linda (2005). A Defense Weapon Known to be of Value: Servicewomen of the Korean War Era (Illustrated ed.). UPNE. ISBN 978-1-5846-5472-8.
