= Siim Kabrits =

Estonian entrepreneur (born 1979)

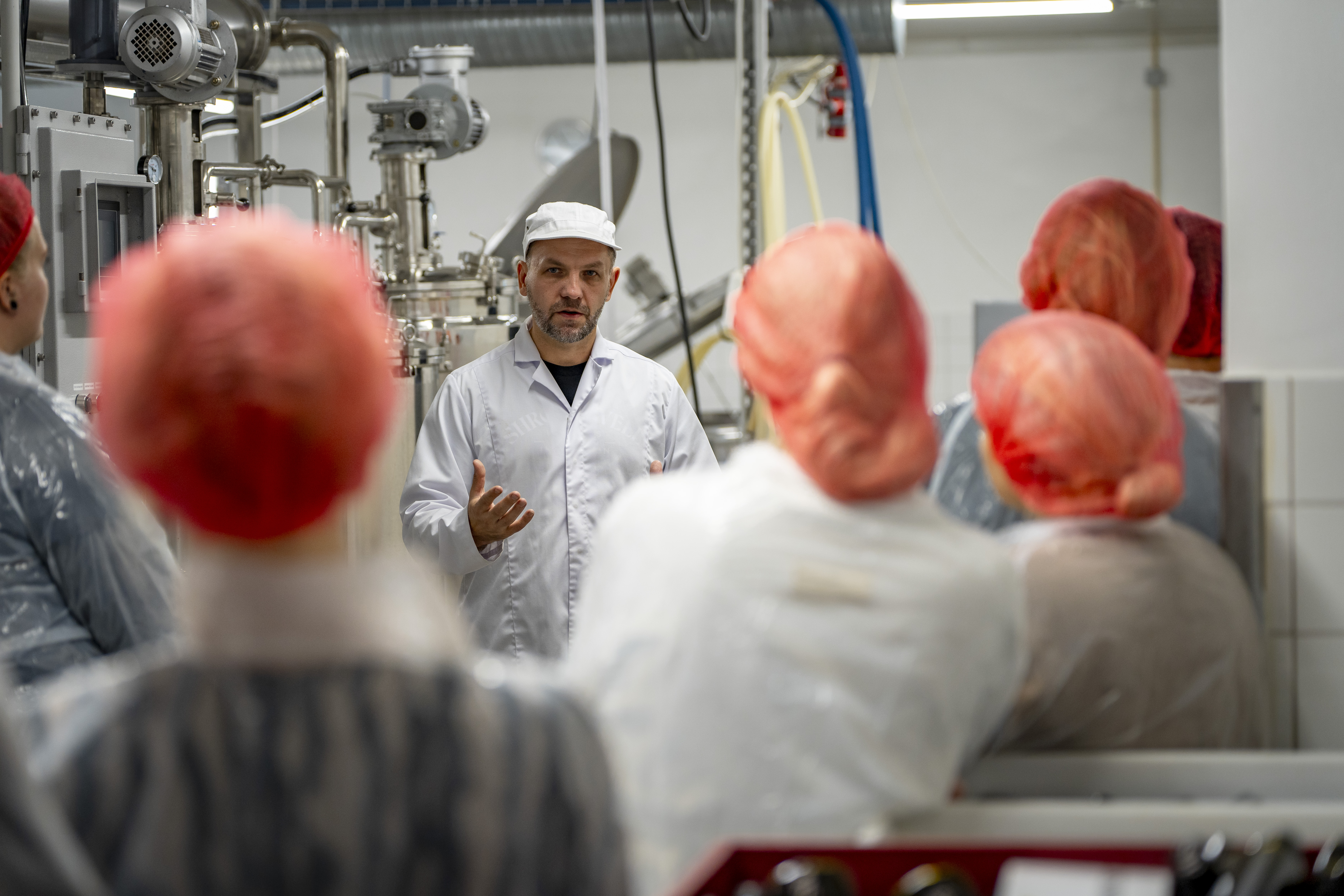
Siim Kabrits showing visitors around Shroomwell factory (2024).

Siim Kabrits (born July 4, 1979, in Tartu) is an Estonian entrepreneur and former politician. He was a member of Riigikogu (the parliament of Estonia) from April 6, 2011, to March 26, 2014.

In 2014, Siim Kabrits founded the mycotechnology company Shroomwell OÜ, where he serves as a board member.

== Education ==
Kabrits graduated from Tõrva High School in 1997.) In 2007 he graduated from the University of Tartu Institute of Law with a Bachelor's degree.

== Political career ==
He ran in the 1999 municipal elections in Karksi Parish as part of the Mulgimaa electoral alliance, receiving 98 votes and being elected to the Karksi Parish Council.

Kabrits was a member of the Isamaa party (and its predecessors) from May 14, 1999, until March 15, 2022.

In the 2009 municipal elections, he ran in Tallinn's electoral district No. 2, received 56 votes, and entered the city council as a substitute member from 2009 to 2011. In the 2013 municipal elections, Kabrits ran once again in Tallinn's electoral district No. 2, received 89 votes, and was elected to the city council. On November 6, 2013, he was also confirmed as a member of the Central Tallinn District Council. He remained a city council member until the 2017 municipal elections.

In the 2011 Estonian parliamentary elections, he received 980 votes and entered the Riigikogu as the substitute member for Helir-Valdor Seeder, who moved on to serve as the Minister for Agriculture. His term ended on March 26, 2014. Kabrits was a member of the legal committee, overseeing legislation related to property law, police and border law, and marital property law. He chaired the Riigikogu’s Mulgimaa support group, helping organize Mulgimaa Month in Tallinn and supporting initiatives for the Mulgi dialect and culture.

== Other public activities ==
From 2007 to 2012, Kabrits was a member of the supervisory board of the KredEx Foundation. In May 2011, he was appointed as a board member of the Gambling Tax Council and he also served on the Environmental Investment Center’s supervisory board from 2011 to 2014.

From 2018 to 2019, Kabrits was a board member of the Estonian Fencing Association. In 2018, the leaders of Mulgimaa municipalities elected him Elder of Mulgimaa.

== Entrepreneurial activity ==
Siim Kabrits played a leading role in the establishment of the Estonian Strawberry Growers' Union and was instrumental in organizing the first Estonian Strawberry Festival in 2006 based on his idea and initiative.

He has managed the berry-selling company OÜ Conesco Eesti and served as the sales director at OÜ Berry Group, a company involved in the export of berries and mushrooms.

Kabrits was one of the authors of the winning idea "Organic Estonia" in the Estonian Development Idea competition organized by the Estonian Development Fund in 2015.

In 2016, an export project involving organic apples led by Kabrits gained attention, as his company exported over 700 tons of organic apples to Germany and Poland for juice production. For this initiative, the newspaper Sakala named him Viljandi County's Exporter of the Year in 2016.

In 2014, Kabrits founded OÜ Shroomwell (formerly OÜ Chaga), specializing in the production of health products and the cultivation of medicinal mushrooms, along with the application of mycotechnology in forestry and environmental restoration.

== Personal life ==
Siim Kabrits' father, Agu Kabrits, was chairman of the Tõrva City Council from 2005 to 2009 and mayor of Tõrva from 2009 to 2013. His grandmother, Õnne-Eha Kabrits, was a member of the Congress of Estonia. His cousin is film director Anna Hints (Smoke Sauna Sisterhood).
