= Pio Pion =

Italian engineer (1887–1965)

- Born: 4 July 1887; Varese, Italy
- Died: 15 September 1965 (aged 78); Milan, Italy
- Known for: Establishing the first Italian movie projector company
- Scientific career
- Fields: Cinema, manufacturing
- Institutions: Officine Pio Pion

Pio Pion (4 July 1887 – 15 May 1965) was an Italian entrepreneur, known for founding the first Italian company producing movie projectors, the Fumagalli, Pion & C.

== Early life ==
Pion vas born in Varese in 1887 to his father Pierre, whose premature death forced the young Pio to move abroad in search for work. He returned to his native Italy in the first years of the 1900s, where he heard of the recent invention of the first movie projector and, consequently, of what is considered to be the first motion picture, thanks to the Lumière brothers. Fascinated by this new technology, Pion and his friend Fumagalli start importing early Pathé Frères equipment.

== Professional career ==
A few years later, in 1908, Pion and Fumagalli decide to produce their own movie equipment, and they start the Fumagalli, Pion & C. company. The business went through highs and lows until the beginning of World War I, when both men are enrolled to the army and forced to momentarily abandon their work. After 1918, Pion resumes his old job on his own and renames his firm Officine Pio Pion.

With cinemas becoming more and more popular, Pion enjoyed the most successful period of his working life. The Officine relocate to a larger location in via Rovereto in Milan. The fascist regime looked favourably on Pion's company, especially after he invented the so-called camion sonoro (sound-lorry), a lorry mounted on a Fiat 508 wheelbase carrying a screen and a movie projector, which, apart from playing films, could also bring propagandist speeches around the major squares.

World War II brought another halt to the company's production, as it was arranged for it to produce Morse code-machinery. At the end of the conflict, Pion once again resumed his job and was joined by his two sons, Pierandrea and Riccardo. In the sixties Pion left the business to his sons and retired. He died in 1965, aged 78.
