= Lawrence Smith =

Lawrence or Laurence Smith may refer to:

== People ==
- J. Lawrence Smith (chemist) (1818–1883), American chemist
- J. Lawrence Smith (New York politician) (1816–1889), New York lawyer, assemblyman, district attorney, county judge
- Laurence D. Smith (born 1950), American psychologist and academic
- Laurence Dwight Smith (1895–1952), American author
- Lawrence Beall Smith (1909–1995), American painter, illustrator, sculptor and lithographer
- Lawrence G. Smith, American physician
- Lawrence H. Smith (1892–1958), US Representative from Wisconsin
- Lawrence J. Smith (born 1941), US Representative from Florida
- Lawrence Leighton Smith (1936–2013), American conductor and pianist
- Lawrence Smith (cricketer) (born 1964), English cricketer
- Lawrence Smith (footballer, born 1878) (1878–1912), English footballer
- Lawrence Smith (soccer) (born 1985), American soccer player
- Lawrence Smith (American football) (born 1979), American football player
- Lawrence Smith (MP) (1515/16 – 1582), member of parliament for City of Chester, England
- Lawrence Smith (general) (fl. from 1976), South African Army general

== Fictional characters ==
- Lawrence Smith (Oz)

== See also ==
- Larry Smith (disambiguation)
- Lauren Smith (disambiguation)
- Laurence Harding-Smith (1929–2021), Australian fencer
- Lawrie Smith (born 1956), British sailor
- Lars Olsson Smith (1836–1913), Swedish politician
- Lorenzo Smith (born 1972), American singer-songwriter
