= Carol Mutter =

United States Marine Corps general

Carol A. Mutter
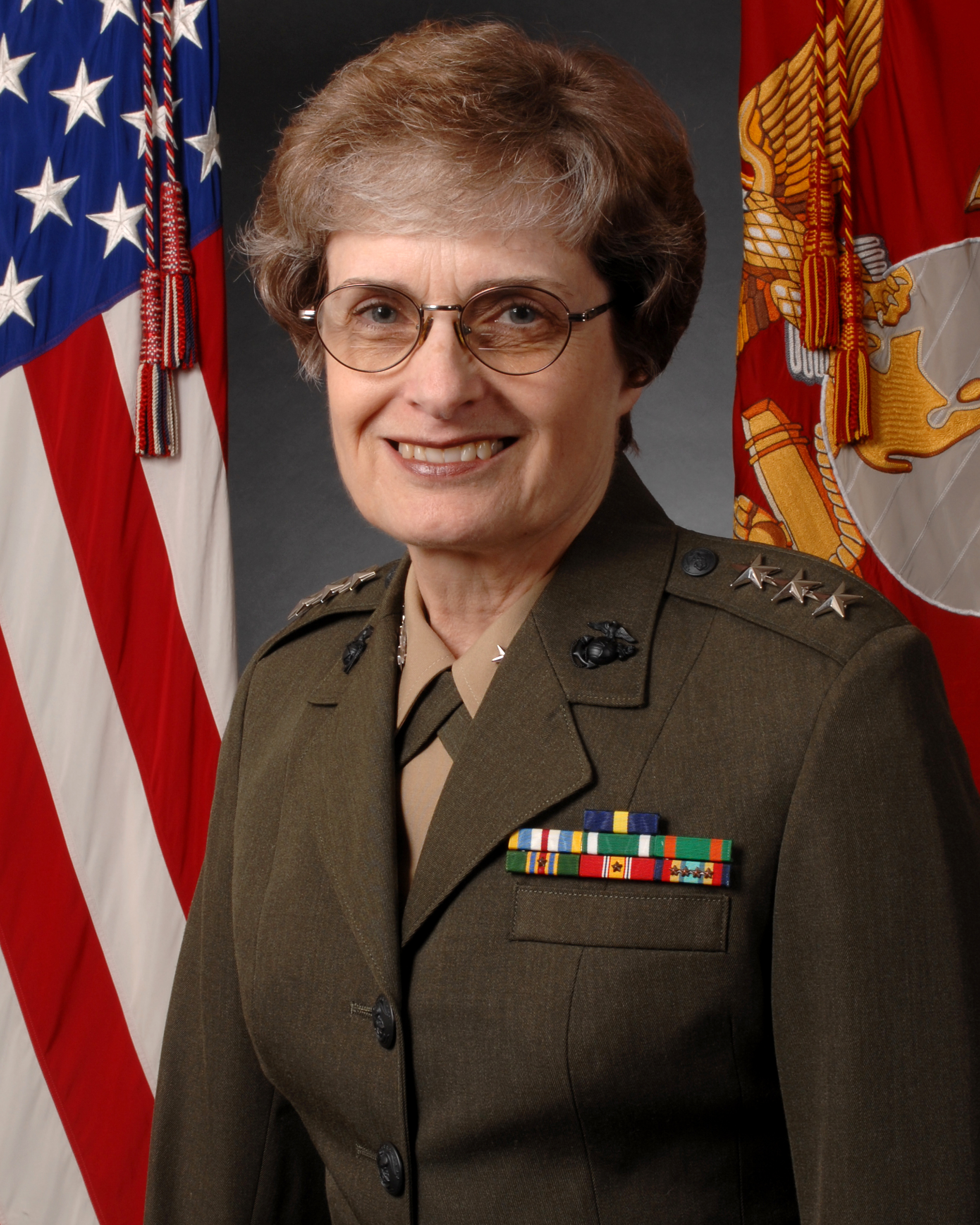
- LtGen Carol A. Mutter (2008)
- Born: Carol Ann Schneider; December 17, 1945 (age 80); Greeley, Colorado, US
- Education: University of Northern Colorado; B.A. in Mathematics; Doctorate (honorary); Naval War College; M.A. in National Security & Strategic Studies; Salve Regina University; M.S. in Business; Doctorate (honorary)
- Spouse(s): Colonel James Mutter, USMC
- Military career
- Allegiance: United States
- Branch: United States Marine Corps
- Service years: 1967–1999
- Rank: Lieutenant General
- Commands: 3rd Force Service Support Group, III Marine Expeditionary Force; Marine Corps Systems Command at Marine Corps Base Quantico
- Awards: Navy Distinguished Service Medal; Defense Superior Service Medal; Navy and Marine Corps Commendation Medal; Navy and Marine Corps Achievement Medal
- Other work: National Advisory Council of the Alliance for National Defense; National Academy of Sciences Committee on American Youth Population and Military Recruiting; Women Marines Association (president); Neah Power

Carol A. Mutter (née Schneider) (born December 17, 1945) is a retired United States Marine Corps lieutenant general. She is the first woman in the history of the United States Armed Forces to be nominated to be a three-star rank (O-9), and the first female to be promoted to lieutenant general. She retired from the Marine Corps on January 1, 1999 after 31 years of service. Her last active duty assignment was as Deputy Chief of Staff, Manpower and Reserve Affairs (DC/S, M&RA) at Marine Corps Headquarters in Washington, D.C. After retiring, she has served in an advisory capacity for various military organizations, as well as consulting in the private sector.

== Early life and education ==
Mutter was born Carol Ann Schneider on December 17, 1945, in Greeley, Colorado to Hedwig (née Spaedt) and Albert Schneider. She grew up on a farm in Colorado, where her parents were sharecroppers. She graduated from Eaton High School in Eaton, Colorado in 1963.

She entered Colorado State College (now the University of Northern Colorado), intending to become a teacher. She became interested in mathematics and sciences, where her classes had predominantly male students, including many former military attending in the G.I. Bill. During the summer between her junior and senior years, she attended a ten-week Women Officer Candidate Course (WOCC) in Quantico, Virginia. She entered her senior year to complete her student teaching requirements. She received her bachelor's degree in Mathematics Education. in 1967. Instead of going into teaching, the day before graduation, she was commissioned as a second lieutenant in the Marine Corps, with a three-year commitment.

Mutter later earned a Master of Arts degree in National Security and Strategic Studies from the Naval War College at Newport, Rhode Island and a Master of Science in Business from Salve Regina University in Newport. In addition, she has honorary doctorates from the University of Northern Colorado and Salve Regina University.

Mutter also attended the Amphibious Warfare School and the Marine Corps Command and Staff College, both at Quantico, Virginia.

== Military career ==
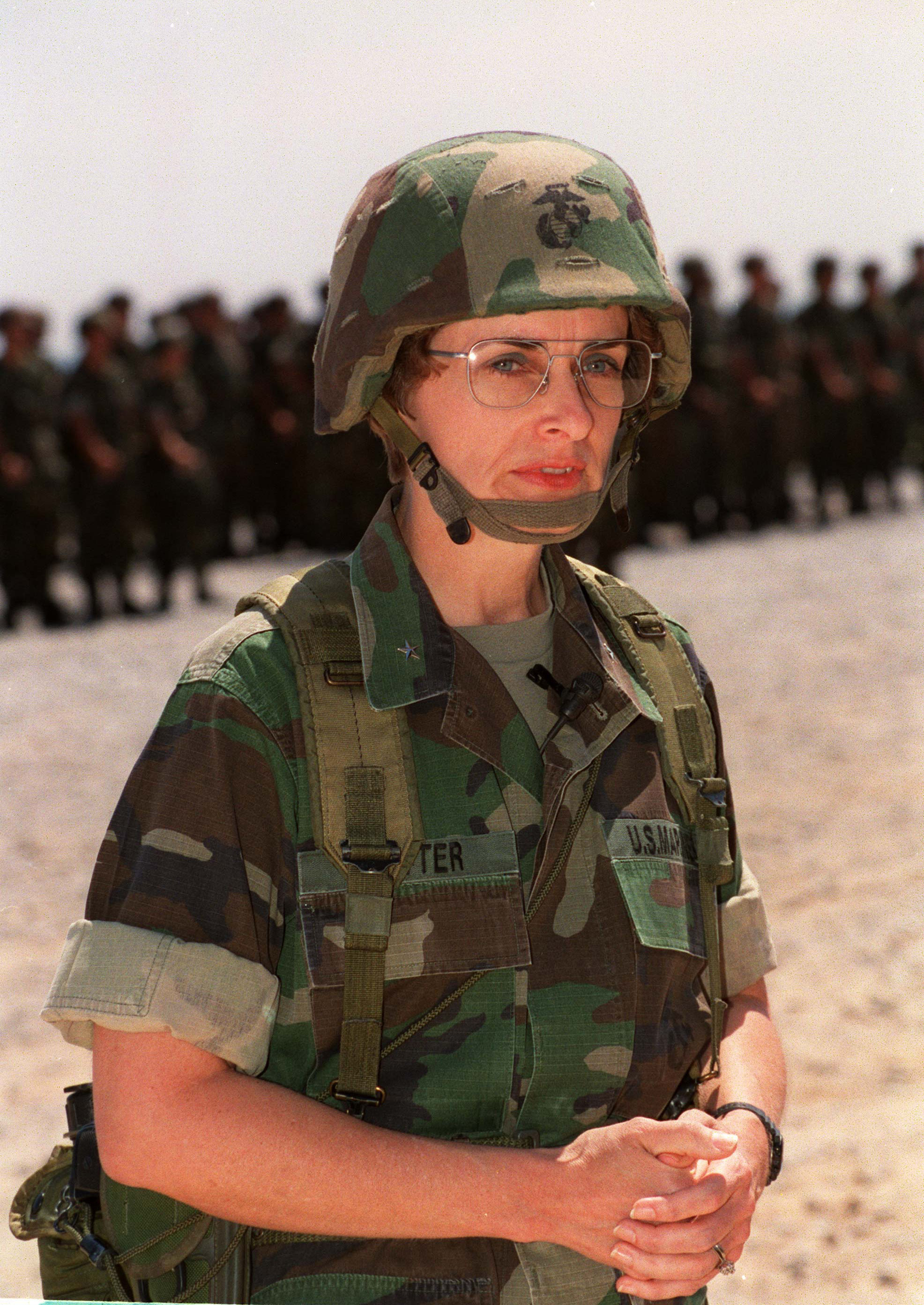
Mutter at change of command ceremony for 3rd FSSG as a brigadier general in May 1994.

After graduating from the University of Northern Colorado, Mutter completed the Woman Officer Basic Course in 1967 at Marine Corps Base Quantico. Her first assignment was to the data processing installations at Quantico, Virginia, and then in Camp Pendleton, California.

In 1971, Mutter returned to Quantico as a platoon commander and instructor for women officer candidates and basic course lieutenants; and, was promoted to captain.

During 1973–1984, Mutter progressed to the rank of lieutenant colonel while serving as Project Officer for Marine Air Command and Control Systems at Marine Corps Tactical Systems Support Activity at Camp Pendleton, California; Financial Management Officer at the Development Center, Quantico, Virginia; Assistant Chief of Staff, Comptroller, 1st Marine Aircraft Wing, Okinawa, Japan; and Deputy Comptroller at Headquarters, Fleet Marine Force, Atlantic in Norfolk, Virginia. In 1985, capitalizing on her expertise in both data processing and financial management, she was assigned as the Deputy Program Manager, and subsequently Program Manager, for the development of new Marine Corps automated pay and personnel systems for active duty, retired, and reserve Marines.

In July 1988, as a colonel, Mutter joined the United States Space Command, J-3 (Operations) Directorate in Colorado Springs becoming the first woman to gain qualification as a Space Director. After initially serving as a Command Center Crew Commander/Space Director she became the Division Chief responsible for the operation of the Space Command Commander in Chief's Command Center.

In August 1990, Mutter was transferred to III Marine Expeditionary Force (MEF) on Okinawa, Japan for duty as the Assistant Chief of Staff, Comptroller for both III MEF and the 3rd Marine Division.

In 1991, Mutter was promoted to brigadier general, and in June, returned to Quantico as a to serve as the Deputy Commanding General, Marine Corps Systems Command and Program Manager for Command and Control Systems. In June 1992, she again transferred to Okinawa, this time as the first woman of general/flag officer rank to command a major deployable tactical command, the 3rd Force Service Support Group (FSSG), (Note: the 3rd FSSG is now the 3rd Marine Logistics Group (MLG).) III Marine Expeditionary Force (III MEF), United States Marine Corps Forces, Pacific.

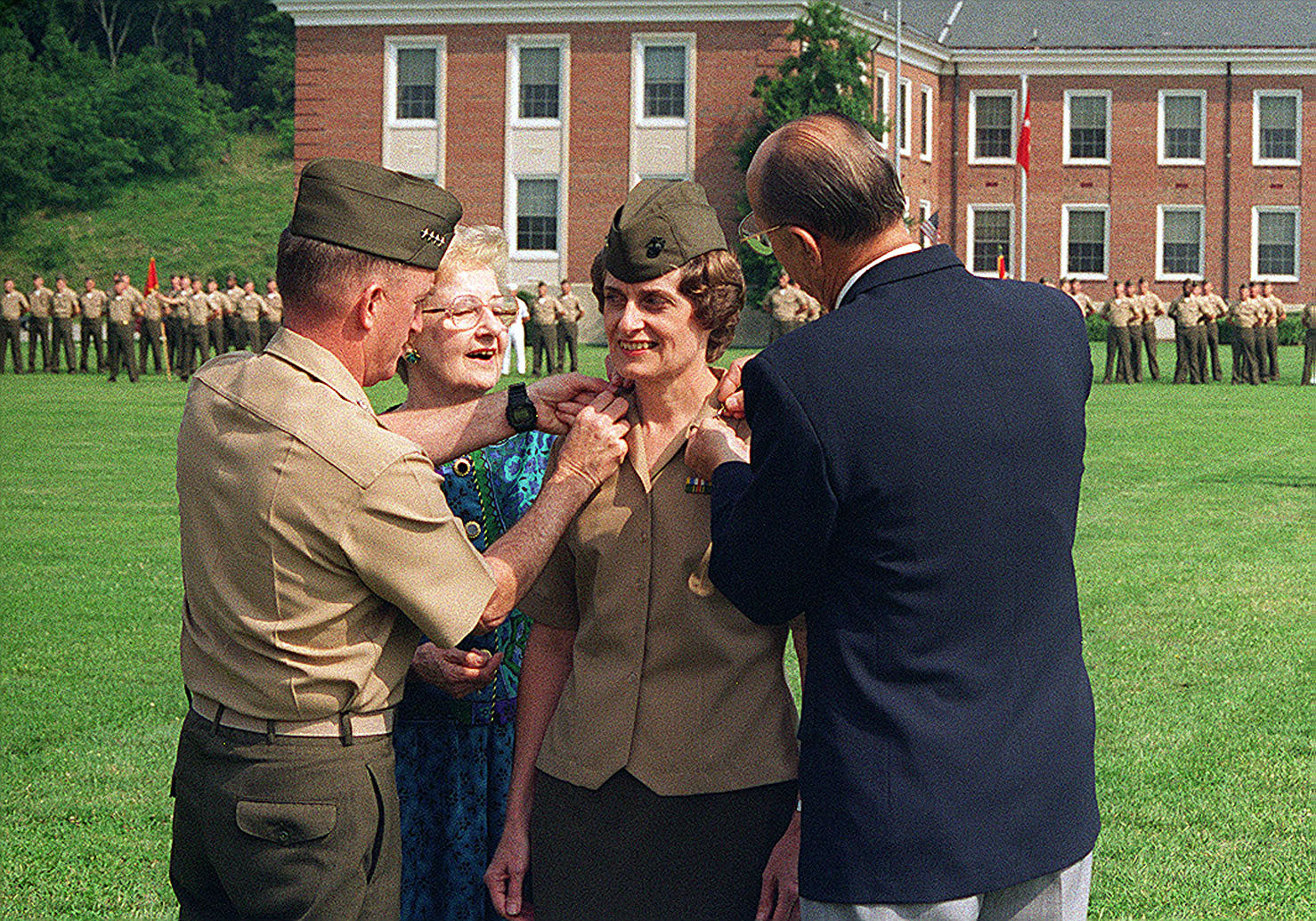
Carol Mutter pinned with the rank of lieutenant general by Marine Corps Commandant, Gen. C.C. Krulak (left), assisted by her husband (right) and mother.

In June 1994, she became the first woman in the Marine Corps to be promoted to the rank of major general (O-8) and served as Commander, Marine Corps Systems Command at Marine Corps Base Quantico until August 1996.

In March 1996, Mutter was nominated for promotion to O-9 by President Bill Clinton. On September 1, 1996, Mutter was promoted to lieutenant general and assumed the duties as Deputy Chief of Staff for Manpower and Reserve Affairs (DC/S M&RA). Of her time at M&RA, she said: "I had the great fortune as lieutenant general to be in charge of Manpower Reserve Affairs [DC/S, M&RA] for the Marine Corps, so I could impact policies and programs for all of our Marines, active and reserve, and also for our families and for our civilian Marines as well....it gave me the tremendous opportunity to make life better."

On January 1, 1999, Lieutenant General Mutter retired from the Marine Corps after 31 years of active service. (Note: Mutter's retirement ceremony at MCB Quantico, presided over by General Charles C. Krulak (Commandant of the Marine Corps), was held on November 6, 1998 in conjunction with the Marine Corps birthday celebration.) Upon retirement, she reflected on the progress of women in the Marine Corps, saying: "Women in [the] military have come a long way in my 31 years. We still have more progress to make, but it won't and shouldn't all happen overnight! Sometimes when we walk up to that door of opportunity and find it's locked we may be tempted to blast it open. I've learned to be careful—by blasting it down, we could destroy what we're trying to get on the other side. . . . There are still challenges, but women today are holding their own, and then some, in Iraq and Afghanistan, and around the world."

== Post-military career ==
=== Military-related roles ===
Mutter served as the president of the Women Marines Association from 2000 to 2004, then served on the board from 2004 to 2008 as the past-president. Mutter joined the WMA as an active duty second lieutenant and, a WMA Life Member, continued to be involved after completing her term on the board.

During the George W. Bush administration, Bush appointed Mutter to serve on the American Battle Monuments Commission. She was also appointed to the Defense Department Advisory Committee on Women in the Services (DACOWITS), which she chaired from 2002 to 2006. DACOWITS is "composed of civilian women and men appointed by the Secretary of Defense to provide advice and recommendations on matters and policies relating to the recruitment, retention, employment, integration, well-being, and treatment of women in the Armed Forces of the United States."

Mutter also served on the Advisory Board of the Indiana Council on World Affairs, the Indiana State (legislative) Commission on Military and Veterans Affairs, as well as being a Senior Fellow at the Joint Forces Staff College in Norfolk, Virginia.

=== Civilian roles ===
Mutter has served as a consultant for IBM, Raytheon, and Revision Eyewear.

In 2008, Carol Mutter and her husband, James Mutter, joined the strategic advisory board of Neah Power Systems, a developer of fuel cells for military applications.

== Personal life ==
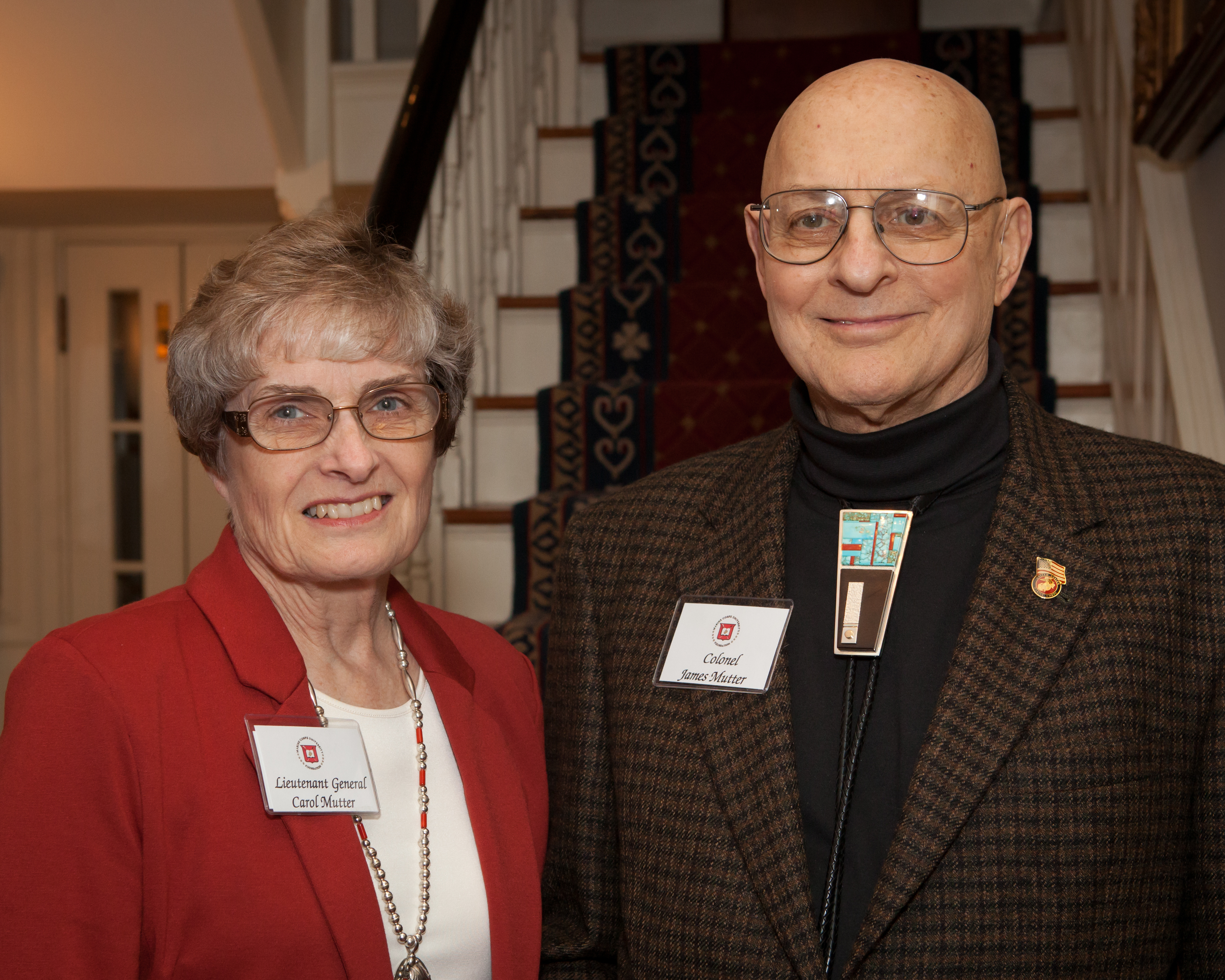
Carol and James Mutter (2014)

Mutter is married to James M. Mutter, who retired from the Marine Corps in July 1993, after 36 years of service, at the rank of colonel. He retired from the Marine Corps to support his wife in her Marine Corps career.

In 2008, Mutter spoke at the Republican National Convention in support of Senator John McCain, the party's nominee for president.

== Awards, recognitions, honors ==
=== Military ===
==== Firsts ====
In Mutter's career in the military, she achieved a number of firsts:

- First woman to qualify as Command Center Crew Commander/Space Director at U.S. Space Command.
- First woman of flag rank to command a major deployable tactical command.
- First female Corp Marine major general, and senior female in all the services at that time. (1994)
- First female in the U.S. military to be nominated to receive three stars. (Note: In March 1996, President Bill Clinton nominated Mutter to receive three-stars. In May 1996, Patricia A. Tracey, U.S. Navy, was nominated to receive her third star.) (Note: Notably, the Marine Corps has historically had a lower percentage of female officer amongst the U.S. military branches.)
- First female lieutenant general in the Marine Corps (September 1, 1996)

==== Military decorations ====

	Navy Distinguished Service Medal	
Defense Superior Service Medal	Navy and Marine Corps Commendation Medal	Navy and Marine Corps Achievement Medal
Navy Meritorious Unit Commendation w/ 1 service star	National Defense Service Medal w/ 1 service star	Navy Sea Service Deployment Ribbon w/ 4 service stars

=== Civilian honors and recognitions ===
Mutter was honored by her alma mater, the University of Northern Colorado (UNC) — first in 1992 when she was given the Trail Blazer Honored Alumni Award, and in 1994, when she was chosen to be the UNC's commencement speaker.

Mutter is the recipient of the 1998 Living Legacy Patriot Award from Women's International Center, "a non-profit education and service foundation [501c3] with the mission to ‘Acknowledge, Honor, Encourage and Educate Women’".

In 2004, Mutter was inducted into the Colorado Women's Hall of Fame. Born and raised in Colorado, she was chosen for making "significant and enduring contributions to her field", elevating "the status of women... in society", and inspiring "others as a role model".

In 2017, she was inducted into the National Women's Hall of Fame, the United States' "oldest organization honoring American women".

== See also ==
- List of female United States military generals and flag officers
- Women in the United States Marine Corps
- Women's Armed Services Integration Act - 1948 law allowing women as permanent members of the U.S. armed forces
- Patricia A. Tracey - first female U.S. Navy three-star admiral (nominated May 1996, promoted in July 1996)
- Claudia J. Kennedy - first female U.S. Army three-star general (nominated in March 1997; promoted on May 21, 1997)
- Leslie F. Kenne - first female U.S. Air Force three-star general (promoted July 1, 1999)
- Nina M. Armagno - first female U.S. Space Force 3-star general (promoted August 2020)
