= Claudia J. Kennedy =

First female three-star general in the US Army

Claudia Kennedy
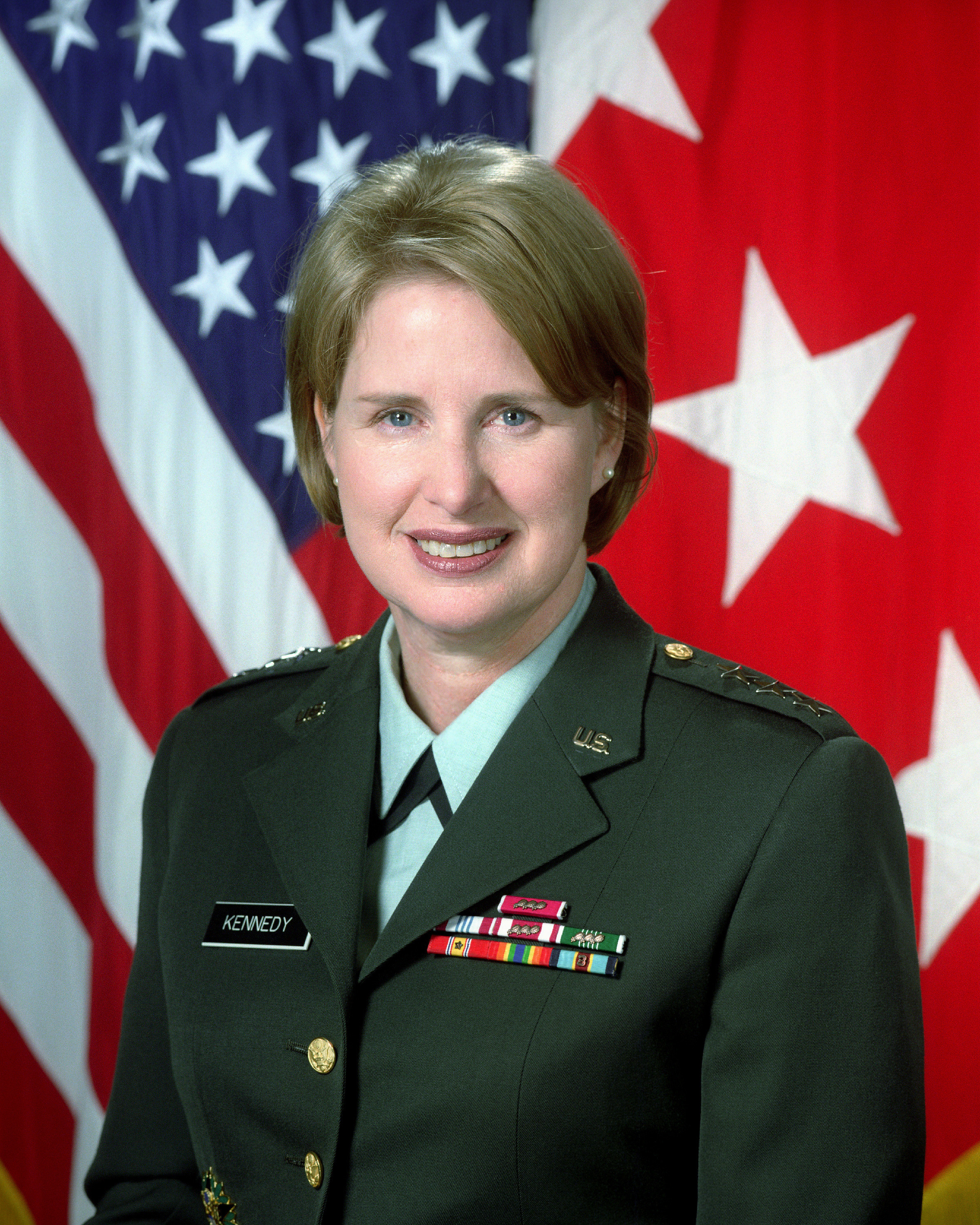
- Official portrait, 1998
- Born: Claudia Jean Kennedy; July 14, 1947 (age 79); Frankfurt, Germany
- Education: Rhodes College (BA)
- Military career
- Allegiance: United States
- Branch: United States Army
- Service years: 1969–2000
- Rank: Lieutenant General
- Commands: 703rd Military Intelligence Brigade; San Antonio Recruiting Battalion; 3rd Operations Battalion
- Awards: Army Distinguished Service Medal; Legion of Merit (4); Defense Meritorious Service Medal; Meritorious Service Medal (4); Army Commendation Medal (4)

Claudia Jean Kennedy (born July 14, 1947) is a retired lieutenant general in the United States Army. She was the first woman to reach the rank of three-star general in the United States Army. She retired in 2000 after 31 years of military service.

== Early life ==
Claudia Kennedy was born on July 14, 1947, in Frankfurt, during the American occupation of Germany after World War II. She attended Southwestern at Memphis (now Rhodes College), where she became a member of Kappa Delta sorority and earned a bachelor's degree in philosophy in 1969. She was commissioned a second lieutenant in the United States Army in June 1969.

== Military career ==
After receiving her commission in 1969, Kennedy served two tours in Germany and one tour in South Korea and focused much of her military career in the fields of intelligence and cryptology.

On May 21, 1997, Kennedy became the first woman in the United States Army to hold a three-star rank. (United States Air Force Lieutenant General Leslie F. Kenne, United States Navy Vice Admiral Patricia Tracey, United States Coast Guard Vice Admiral Vivien Crea, and United States Marine Corps Lieutenant General Carol Mutter held equal ranks in other branches of the military.) She was named Army Deputy Chief of Staff for Intelligence.

Kennedy is a member of the Military Intelligence Hall of Fame.

=== Accusation against another general ===
In 1999, Kennedy made a sexual harassment claim against fellow officer, Major General Larry Smith, stemming from an incident in 1996 when she was a major general and he was a brigadier general. Kennedy made the accusation after Smith was slated for promotion to the position of army Deputy Inspector General, the position responsible for investigation of sexual harassment claims. Kennedy claimed that Smith had attempted to grope and kiss her; Smith's appointment to the inspector general's office was later withdrawn. In 2000, an inquiry by the United States Army's Inspector General concluded that Kennedy was a victim of inappropriate sexual advances from Smith.

== Awards and decorations ==
Kennedy's awards include the National Intelligence Distinguished Service Medal, Army Distinguished Service Medal, Legion of Merit (three Oak Leaf Clusters), the Defense Meritorious Service Medal, the Meritorious Service Medal (three Oak Leaf Clusters), the Army Commendation Medal (three Oak Leaf Clusters), and the Army Staff Identification Badge.

== After retirement ==
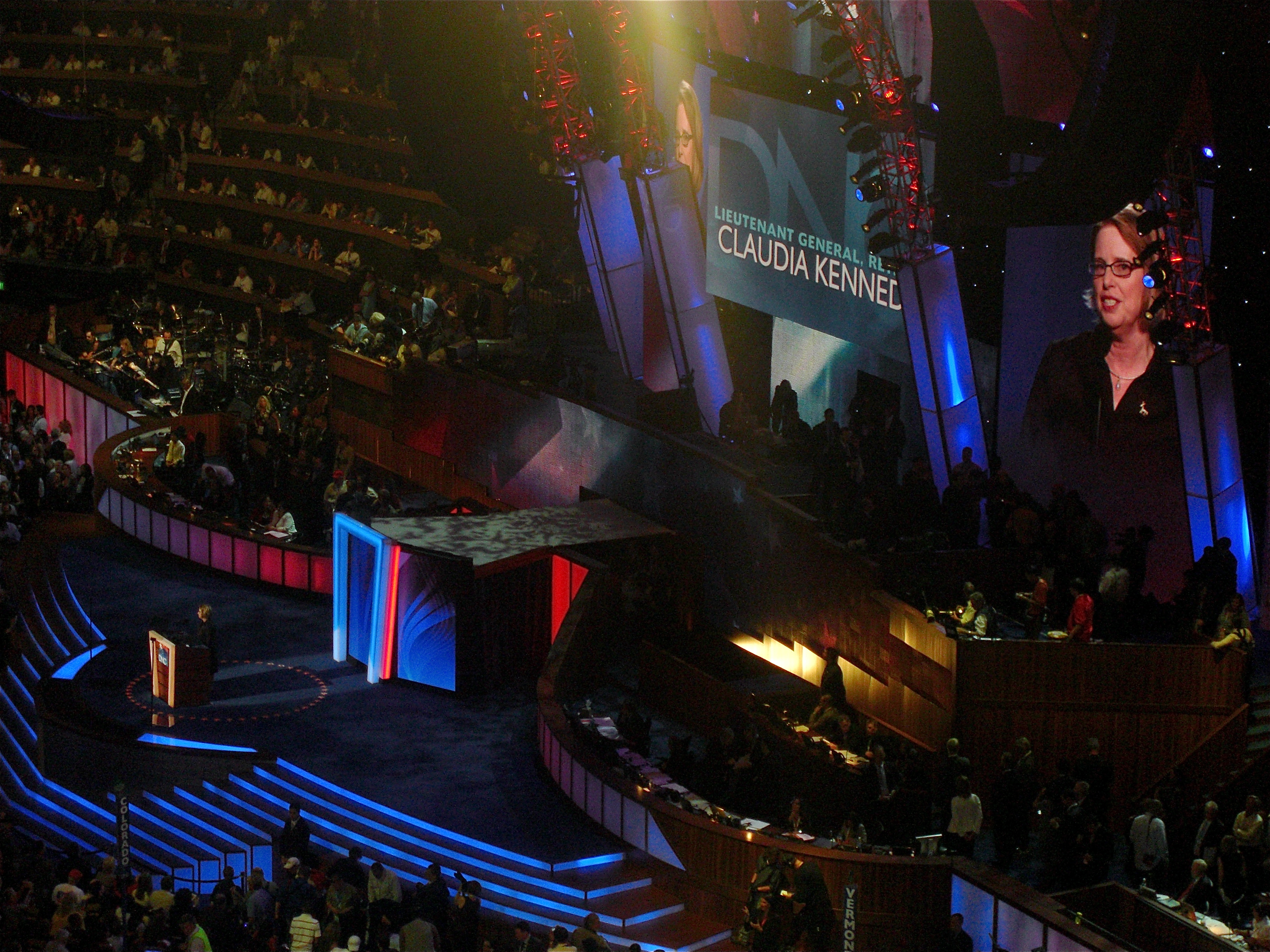
Kennedy speaks during the third night of the 2008 Democratic National Convention in Denver, Colorado.

Kennedy retired from the military in June 2000 after 31 years. During the 2000 United States presidential election, Kennedy was critical of George W. Bush's proposed military policies, especially as they related to the status of women in the armed forces. According to Kennedy: "If Mr. Bush becomes president, his campaign platform says he will move us back to a much earlier time." In other matters of military policy, Kennedy supported repealing the "Don't ask, don't tell" policy.

In 2002, Democrats actively sought to recruit Kennedy to challenge Senator John Warner, a Republican from Virginia. Kennedy passed on the race.

She contributed the piece "Redefining the Warrior Mentality: Women in the Military" to the 2003 anthology Sisterhood Is Forever: The Women's Anthology for a New Millennium, edited by Robin Morgan.

Kennedy endorsed Senator John Kerry for the 2004 Democratic presidential nomination in September 2003, and served as an advisor to the Kerry campaign. She sometimes was mentioned as a possible nominee for Secretary of Defense in a Kerry administration. She endorsed military veteran candidates Eric Massa and Patrick Murphy in 2006. In 2007 and 2008 she endorsed Senator Hillary Clinton and Senator Barack Obama in their respective campaigns for the presidency. She was discussed as a potential vice presidential choice for the Democratic presidential nominee, Barack Obama.

In June 2010, she was appointed as chairwoman of the Defense Advisory Committee on Women in the Services, a committee which is appointed by the United States Secretary of Defense and which reports to the United States Department of Defense.

Kennedy also served as co-chair of the Platform Committee of the 2012 Democratic National Convention.

== See also ==
- List of female United States military generals and flag officers
