= J. Lawrence Smith =

J. Lawrence Smith may refer to:

- J. Lawrence Smith (chemist), American chemist and mineralogist
- J. Lawrence Smith (New York politician), American lawyer, politician, and judge

== See also ==
- Lawrence Smith (disambiguation)
- John Smith (disambiguation)
