= Larry Smith =

Larry Smith may refer to:

== Entertainment ==
- Larry Smith (puppeteer) (1938–2018), producer of children's programming and creator of the Larry Smith Puppets troupe
- Larry R. Smith (born 1943), American professor, novelist, poet
- Larry Smith (musician) (born 1944), British drummer
- Larry E. Smith (born 1945), Canadian musician, composer, recording artist
- Larry Smith (producer) (1952–2014), American record producer
- Larry Smith (editor) (born 1968), editor of Smith Magazine and co-author of Six Word Memoirs
- Larry Smith (cinematographer), British cinematographer
- Larry Smith, fictional parent character in Wee Sing: The Best Christmas Ever!

== Politics ==
- Larry G. Smith (politician) (1914–1992), member of the Ohio House of Representatives
- Larry Smith (trade unionist) (1923–2005), British trade union leader
- Larry Smith (Canadian politician) (born 1951), Canadian senator, Canadian football player, president of the Montreal Alouettes

== Sports ==
- Larry Smith (American football coach) (1939–2008), college football coach
- Larry H. Smith (1939–2002), US national hockey player and University of Minnesota standout
- Larry Smith (racing driver) (1942–1973), 1972 Winston Cup Grand National Series Rookie of The Year
- Larry Smith (running back) (born 1947), American football running back
- Larry Smith (basketball, born 1958) (born 1958), professional basketball player
- Larry Smith (basketball, born 1968), high school and college basketball player
- Larry Smith (defensive tackle) (born 1974), American football defensive back
- Larry Smith (linebacker) (born 1965), American football linebacker

== Other ==
- Larry G. Smith (United States Army), United States Army general
- 14598 Larrysmith (1998 SU60), a main belt asteroid

== See also ==
- Lawrence Smith (disambiguation)
- Lauren Smith (disambiguation)
- Laurie Smith (born 1952), sheriff
- Lawrie Smith (born 1956), British sailor
- Lars Olsson Smith (1836–1913), Swedish politician
- Larry Smyth (1902–1960), American journalist and public official
