= Lorrain Smith =

Lorrain Smith may refer to:

- James Lorrain Smith (1862–1931), Scottish pathologist
- Annie Lorrain Smith (1854–1937), British lichenologist

== See also ==
- Lorraine Smith Pangle (born 1958), American philosopher
- Lauren Smith (disambiguation)
- Lorrain (disambiguation)
- Smith (disambiguation)
