= Blow the Man Down =

English sea shanty

"Blow the Man Down" is an English-language sea shanty, listed as 2624 in the Roud Folk Song Index.

== History ==
=== Written history ===
Contemporary publications and the memories of individuals, in later publications, put the existence of this shanty by the 1860s. The Syracuse Daily Courier, July 1867, quoted a lyric from the song, which was said to be used for hauling halyards on a steamship bound from New York to Glasgow. In 1879, George Haswell was passenger aboard another steamship, from London to Sydney, at which time he noted some of the shanties of the crew. These were published in the ship's own fortnightly newspaper, The Parramatta Sun, and they included a full set of lyrics for "Blow the Man Down." The lyrics take up the theme of a ship of the Black Ball Line, and include the refrains, "Wae! Hae! Blow the man down / Give me some time to blow the man down." Although Haswell's article did not receive wide circulation, it did find its way into the hands of Laura Alexandrine Smith, whose own large collection of sailors' songs, The Music of the Waters (1888), was one of the first to be widely available. Smith reprinted the lyrics gathered by Haswell. She also presented a different version of the song that she herself presumably collected, and which was said to be used for hoisting topsail yards. Its lyrics include reference to a sailor coming home to England from Hong Kong, as well as meeting a girl on "Winchester Street."

=== Early recordings ===
Many recordings were made in the first half of the twentieth century of former sailors singing the shanty. Percy Grainger recorded a man named Tom Roberts in Chelsea, London singing a version in 1908, which can be heard online via the British Library Sound Archive. The folklorist James Madison Carpenter made recordings of the song in England, Scotland and Wales in the early 1930s, all of which are available on the Vaughan Williams Memorial Library. Helen Hartness Flanders recorded several versions sung by former sailors in the 1940s in New England, whilst Helen Creighton recorded several Nova Scotian versions in the 1940s and 50s.

== Lyrics ==
Blow the Man Down
Tune for Blow the Man Down

Like most chanties of this type, "Blow the Man Down" was sung to a flexible combination of customary verses, floating verses from within the general chanty repertoire, and verses improvised in the moment or peculiar to individual singers. The song was of indefinite length, and created by supplying solo verses to an invariable two-part refrain. The structure is as follows:

[Soloist's verse, first half]
Refrain: "Way hey blow the man down" [or "To me, weigh, hey, blow the man down"]
[Soloist's verse, second half]
Refrain: "Give me some time to blow the man down!"

Solo verse couplets documented to have been sung to "Blow the Man Down" include the following from sailors of the 19th century.

As I was a walking down Paradise Street
A pretty young damsel I chanced for to meet.

She was round in the counter and bluff in the bow,
So I took in all sail and cried, "Way enough now."

I hailed her in English, she answered me clear,
"I'm from the Black Arrow bound to the Shakespeare."

So I tailed her my flipper and took her in tow
And yardarm to yardarm away we did go.

But as we were going she said unto me
There's a spanking full-rigger just ready for sea.

That spanking full-rigger to New York was bound;
She was very well manned and very well found.

And as soon as that packet was out on the sea,
'Twas devilish hard treatment of every degree.

But as soon as that packet was clear of the bar
The mate knocked me down with the end of a spar.

It's starboard and larboard on deck you will sprawl
For Kicking Jack Williams commands the Black Ball.

So I give you fair warning before we belay,
Don't ever take heed of what pretty girls say.

A bonnie good mate and a captain too,
A bonnie good ship and a bonnie good crew,

Blow the man down, bullies, blow the man down;
Blow the man down, bullies, pull him around.

Blow the man down, you darlings, lie down,
Blow the man down for fair London town.

When the Black Baller is ready for sea,
That is the time that you see such a spree.

There's tinkers, and tailors, and soldiers, and all,
They all ship for sailors on board the Black Ball.

When the Black Baller hauls out of the dock,
To see these poor fellows, how on board they flock.

When the Black Baller gets clear of the land,
'Tis then you will hear the great word of command.

'Lay aft here, ye lubbers, lay aft, one and all,
I'll none of your dodges on board the Black Ball'.

To see these poor devils, how they will all 'scoat,'
Assisted along by the toe of a boot.

It's now we are sailing on th' ocean so wide,
Where the deep and blue waters dash by our black side.

It's now when we enter the channel so wide,
All hands are ordered to scrub the ship's side.

And now, my fine boys, we are round the rock,
And soon, oh! soon, we will be in the dock.

Then all our hands will bundle ashore,
Perhaps some will never to sea go more.

== Another version ==
An article by Felix Riesenberg, who trained and served as an officer in the Merchant Marine in the 1890s, depicts earlier sailors singing these plainer work lyrics not specifically about the Black Ball line. The men are raising the topsail on a merchant ship to get under sail from New York to Liverpool, with the chantey led by a sailor named Jimmie:

Jimmie—Now rouse her right up boys for Liverpool town.
Sailors—Go way, way, blow the man down.
Jimmie—We'll blow the man up and blow the man down.
Sailors—Oh, give us some time to blow the man down.
Jimmie—We lay off the island of Maderdegascar.
Sailors—Hi, ho, blow the man down.
Jimmie—We lowered two anchors to make her hold faster
Sailors—Oh, give us some time to blow the man down.
All hands—
Then we'll blow the man up.
And we'll blow the man down.
Go way, way, blow the man down.
We'll blow him right over to Liverpool town.
Oh give us some time to blow the man down.
Ho stand by your braces, and stand by your falls;
Hi, ho, blow the man down,
We'll blow him clean over to Liverpool town,
Oh give us some time to blow the man down.
