= Laura Smyth =

Laura Smyth may refer to:

- Laura Smyth (politician)
- Laura Smyth (comedian)

== See also ==
- Laura Smith (disambiguation)
