= Laura Smith =

Laura Smith may refer to:

- Laura Smith (Canadian singer) (1952–2020), Canadian folk singer-songwriter
- Laura Smith (American singer), American blues singer
- Laura Smith (British politician), British politician
- Laura Smith (Canadian politician), Canadian politician
- Laura Smith (American politician), American politician
- Laura Alexandrine Smith, English musician and ethnomusicologist
- Laura-Lee Smith, New Zealand table tennis player
- Laura Faye Smith, American voice actress
- Laura Smith Haviland, American abolitionist, suffragette, and social reformer
- Laura Cuppy Smith (c. 1833–1882), American spiritualist and activist in California's women's suffrage movement

== See also ==
- Laura Kyrke-Smith, British politician
- Lauren Smith (disambiguation)
- Laurie Smith, sheriff
- Laura Smyth (disambiguation)
