= Lauren Smith =

Lauren Smith is the name of:

- Lauren Smith (football manager), football coach
- Lauren Smith (badminton) (born 1991), British badminton player
- Lauren Smith (cricketer) (born 1996), Australian cricket player
- Lauren Smith (swimmer), who competed for Great Britain at the 2011 World Aquatics Championships
- Lauren Ashley Smith, American writer, producer, and comedian
- Lauren Lee Smith (born 1980), Canadian actress
- Lauren Spencer-Smith, Canadian singer-songwriter
- Lauren "Betty" Smith, the mother of Blythe Baxter in Littlest Pet Shop (2012 TV series)

== See also ==
- Lawrence Smith (disambiguation)
- Larry Smith (disambiguation)
- Laura Smith (disambiguation)
- Loren A. Smith, American judge
- Lorrain Smith (disambiguation)
- Laurie Smith (born 1952), sheriff
- Lorenzo Smith (born 1972), American singer-songwriter
