= Thomas Pangle =

American philosopher (born 1944)

Thomas Pangle FRSC
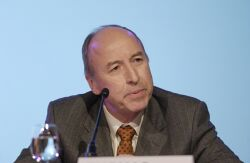
- Born: Thomas Lee Pangle; 1944 (age 81–82); Gouverneur, New York, U.S.
- Education: Cornell University (BA); University of Chicago (PhD)
- Occupation: Political scientist
- Spouse: Lorraine Smith Pangle
- Scientific career
- Academic advisors: Leo Strauss

Thomas Lee Pangle, FRSC (born 1944) is an American political scientist. He holds the Joe R. Long Chair in Democratic Studies in the Department of Government and is Co-Director of the Thomas Jefferson Center for Core Texts and Ideas at the University of Texas at Austin. He has also taught at the University of Toronto and Yale University. He was a student of Leo Strauss.

== Education and career ==
Pangle was born and grew up in Gouverneur, New York. He graduated from Cornell University with a Bachelor of Arts degree in 1966, "with distinction in all subjects" and ranked fifth in class, having studied political philosophy under Allan Bloom. Pangle received his Ph.D. in political science in 1972 from the University of Chicago. His dissertation was "Montesquieu and the Moral Basis of Liberal Democracy," completed under the supervision of Joseph Cropsey, Herbert Storing, and Richard E. Flathman.

From 1971 to 1979 he taught at Yale University, first as a lecturer and then as an assistant professor and associate professor. In 1979 he was appointed to Graduate School at the University of Toronto as an Associate Professor and was awarded tenure. He became a professor in 1983 and was named University Professor in 2001. During his tenure at the University of Toronto Pangle was first a fellow at Victoria College from 1979 to 1984 and then at St. Michael's College from 1985 to 2004. Pangle left the University of Toronto after 25 years to accept the position of Joe R. Long Chair in Democratic Studies in the Department of Government at the University of Texas at Austin, citing concerns about mandatory retirement.

Pangle was a visiting professor at the University of Chicago in 1984 and at the École des Hautes Études en Sciences Sociales in 1987.

Pangle is married to fellow professor Lorraine Smith Pangle, who was also a faculty member at the University of Toronto and is a professor in the Department of Government at the University of Texas.

== Academic interests ==
Pangle's writings on ancient political philosophy attempt to show how Socratic arguments for the supremacy of the philosophic life shape, enrich, and ground the classical republican teaching on civic and moral virtue and on the spiritual goals of self-government. His studies of medieval and biblical political thought seek to revive the mutually challenging dialogue between the competing Socratic and scriptural notions of wisdom and of the cultivation of wisdom in civic life.

His interpretations of the thought of the American Founding, and of its philosophic foundations in Locke and Montesquieu, prepares the ground for his exposition of Nietzsche as the most radical critic of modern rationalism. These studies argue for the significance, within modernity, of a continued if eclipsed commitment to the life of understanding pursued for its own sake. At the same time, Pangle diagnoses the costs and the benefits—for civic virtue as well as for the life of the mind—of the diminished public or civic status of the moral and intellectual virtues in modern republicanism.

Pangle is a Fellow of the Royal Society of Canada, and has won Guggenheim, Killam-Canada Council, Carl Friedrich von Siemens, and four National Endowment for the Humanities fellowships. He has been awarded The Benton Bowl at Yale University (for contribution to education in politics) and the Robert Foster Cherry Great Teacher of the World Prize, Baylor University. In 2007 he delivered, at the invitation of the Bavarian Academy of Sciences, the Werner Heisenberg Lecture. A Festschrift in his honor was published as: Recovering Reason: Essays in Honor of Thomas L. Pangle. Edited by Timothy Burns. Lexington Books, 2010.

== Pangle's conception of philosophy ==
Inspired and guided by Leo Strauss's revival of Platonic political philosophy, Pangle's work has as its unifying aim the clarification and defense of the original Socratic conception of political philosophy. In the manner that Pangle understands it, the Socratic conception is controversial.

What the Socratic conception of political theory amounts to, Pangle contends, is a lifelong vindication, through conversational refutations that purify common sense notions of justice and nobility, of self-knowledge and of inquiry into the nature of things as the highest and supremely fulfilling dimension of human existence. This notion of the true human good, as the good that makes all relativistic and egalitarian outlooks appear impoverished, obviously contradicts or directly clashes with what most people today are told and believe is the life they ought to lead. Pangle asserts that the awakened philosophic life is the only truly human life.

== Yale tenure controversy ==
Pangle was denied tenure at Yale University, in a scandal, during which a senior colleague explained, in a pronouncement (which became the theme of a protest panel at the annual convention of the American Political Science Association): "academic freedom is one thing, but there are two types who will never be permitted tenure at Yale: Leninists and Straussians." The Wall Street Journal ("Dry Rot at College," Editorial Aug. 31, 1979, p. 6), Commentary ("God and Man at Yale—Again," by Robert Kagan, February, 1982; Letters exchange, August, 1982) and other journals (The New York Review of Books, May 12, 1983, pp. 56–57, "Saving the Free World: An Exchange," statement by Eugene Genovese; Yale Political Monthly, Dec. 1979, pp. 2–11, "Academic Freedom at Yale: the Pangle Case"), published editorials, columns, and articles attacking Yale's denial of academic freedom. Yale or its spokespersons denied the imputations. Yale set up a judiciary panel, led by the historian Edmund Morgan, to hear the case—amid campus-wide protests and marches on Pangle's behalf (Yale Daily News, Sept. 10, 1979, p. 1, "2,300 Students Protest Tenure Policy"); the panel decided in Pangle's favor and rescinded the decision denying tenure by the Department of Political Science, on the basis of testimony from graduate students about what Political Science faculty had declared in public about the grounds on which Pangle was being denied tenure. Yale instituted a new procedure that took the decision out of the hands of the department and lodged it in a board, specially designed for Pangle's tenure review, that was composed of five scholars, two not from Yale (led by Peter Gay): Yale University News Release, Monday afternoon, Oct. 15, 1979; Yale Weekly Bulletin and Calendar, Oct. 22–29, 1979, p. 1; Yale Daily News, Extra Edition, Oct. 16, 1979, "Pangle Wins New Tenure Review: Original Decision Overruled; Professor says he is 'gratified'". At that point, Pangle resigned, having been offered a tenured position at the University of Toronto (see entries on C. B. Macpherson and Allan Bloom)—and because, as he declared, he no longer felt he could comfortably live with his colleagues in the Yale Political Science Department.

== Noted lectures ==
- Speaker at the National Endowment for the Humanities Inaugural Colloquium on the Bicentennial of the Constitution, Wake Forest University, 1984.
- Exxon Distinguished Lectures in Humane Approaches to the Social Sciences, at the University of Chicago, 1987.
- Thomas J. White Lecture, at Notre Dame, 1988.
- The Plenary Address, Association of American Law Schools Annual Meeting, 1989.
- Feaver MacMinn Visiting Scholar at the University of Oklahoma, 1990.
- The Ronald J. Fiscus Lecture, Skidmore College (2001).
- Werner Heisenberg Memorial Lecture at the Carl Friedrich von Siemens Foundation, Bavarian Academy of Sciences, Munich, Germany, 2007.
- Herbert W. Vaughan Lecture on America's Founding Principles, Princeton University, 2007.
- On Liberal Education at the Jack Miller Center, 2011.

== Bibliography ==
- Montesquieu's Philosophy of Liberalism: A Commentary on The Spirit of the Laws . University of Chicago Press, 1973. —Chinese translation (Shanghai: Huaxia, Hermes, Classici et Commentarii, East China Normal University Press, 2017).
- The Laws of Plato: translated with notes and an interpretive essay by Thomas L. Pangle. Basic Books, 1980. —Chinese translation (by Ying Zhu) of interpretive essay (Shanghai: Huaxia, Hermes, Classici et Commentarii, East China Normal University Press, 2012).
- The Roots of Political Philosophy: Ten Forgotten Socratic Dialogues, translated, with interpretive studies. (Editor) Cornell University Press, 1987. —Chinese translation forthcoming: Beijing, The Commercial Press (Bardon-Chinese Media Agency).
- The Spirit of Modern Republicanism: The Moral Vision of the American Founders and the Philosophy of Locke. University of Chicago Press, 1988. —Chinese translation forthcoming from East China Normal University Press, with new author's Preface.
- The Rebirth of Classical Political Rationalism: An Introduction to the Thought of Leo Strauss: Essays and Lectures by Leo Strauss, selected and introduced by T. L. Pangle. University of Chicago Press, 1989. —French translation, Editions Gallimard, Bibliothèque de Philosophie 1993. Japanese translation, The English Agency Ltd., 1998. Chinese translation, Shanghai: Huaxia, Hermes, Classici et Commentarii, 2009 and revised 2011.
- The Ennobling of Democracy: The Challenge of the Postmodern Age. Johns Hopkins University Press, 1992. —Uszlachetnianie demokracji: Wyzwanie epoki postmodernistycznej (Krakow: Wydawnictwo Znak, Library of Political Thought of the Center for Political Thought, 1994), 318 pages. (Polish translation by Marek Klimowicz.)—Chinese translation forthcoming from East China Normal University Press, with new author's Preface.
- The Learning of Liberty: The Educational Ideas of the American Founders (with Lorraine Smith Pangle). University Press of Kansas, 1993
- Political Philosophy and the Human Soul: Essays in Memory of Allan Bloom. Rowman & Littlefield Publishers, 1995. Co-editor with Michael Palmer, and author of “The Hebrew Bible’s Challenge to Political Philosophy: Some Introductory Reflections,” 67–82.—Chinese translation of essay, in Classici et Commentarii 39: Laws and Political Philosophy, ed. Lei Peng (Shanghai: Huaxia, Hermes, Classici et Commentarii, 2013), pp. 2–21.
- Justice Among Nations: On the Moral Basis of Power and Peace, (with Peter J. Ahrensdorf). U. Press of Kansas, 1999.
- Political Philosophy and the God of Abraham. Johns Hopkins University Press, 2003.
- Leo Strauss: An Introduction to His Thought and Intellectual Legacy. Johns Hopkins U. Press, 2006
- The Great Debate: Advocates and Opponents of the American Constitution. The Teaching Company, 2007.
- The Theological Basis of Liberal Modernity in Montesquieu's "Spirit of the Laws". University of Chicago Press, 2010.
- Political Philosophy Cross-Examined: Perennial Challenges to the Philosophic Life (Palgrave-Macmillan, 2013). Co-editor with J. Harvey Lomax, and author of “Aristotle’s Politics Book 7 On the Best Way of Life.”
- Birds, Peace, Wealth: Aristophanes’ Critique of the Gods. Ed. and Trans. with Wayne Ambler. Paul Dry Books, 2013.
- Political Philosophy Cross-Examined: Perennial Challenges to the Philosophic Life. Ed. with J. Harvey Lomax. Palgrave-Macmillan, 2013.
- Sophocles: The Theban Plays. Oedipus the Tyrant, Oedipus at Colonus, Antigone. Translated with Introductions. With Peter J. Ahrensdorf. Cornell University Press, 2013.
- Aristotle’s Teaching in the POLITICS. University of Chicago Press, 2013. —Chinese translation, Shanghai: Huaxia, Hermes, Classici et Commentarii, East China Normal University Press, 2017.
- "On Heisenberg’s Key Statement Concerning Ontology," Review of Metaphysics 67 (June 2014), 835-59.
- The Key Texts of Political Philosophy: An Introduction, co-authored with Timothy Burns (Cambridge: Cambridge U. Press, 2014). —Chinese translation forthcoming from Beijing United Publishing Co.
- The Socratic Way of Life: Xenophon's MEMORABILIA (Chicago: U. of Chicago Press, 2018).
- The Socratic Founding of Political Philosophy: Xenophon's ECONOMIST, SYMPOSIUM, AND APOLOGY (Chicago: U. of Chicago Press, 2020).

== See also ==
- American philosophy
- List of American philosophers
