= Defense Department Advisory Committee on Women in the Services =

American military organization

Defense Advisory Committee on Women in the Services
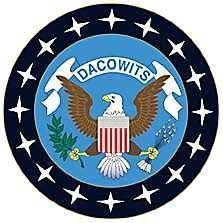

Agency overview
- Formed: August 1951
- Dissolved: 24 September, 2025
- Parent department: Department of Defense
- Website: https://dacowits.defense.gov/

The Defense Advisory Committee on Women in the Services (DACOWITS) was one of the oldest Department of Defense (DoD) federal advisory committees and was established in 1951 by then-Secretary of Defense (SecDef) George C. Marshall. The committee was composed of civilian women and men appointed by the SecDef to provide advice and recommendations on matters and policies relating to the recruitment, retention, employment, integration, well-being, and treatment of women in the U.S. Armed Forces. As a discretionary DoD federal advisory committee, it was authorized under the provisions of the Federal Advisory Committee Act (FACA) of 1972 (5 U.S.C., Appendix) and 41 C.F.R. § 102-3.50(d). Committee members reviewed issues and conducted information-gathering activities through installation visits, meetings, reports, and surveys. The committee typically met quarterly and provided recommendations to the SecDef for consideration via an annual report.

In May 2025, the DOD, under Secretary Pete Hegseth, proposed cutting fourteen (14) defense advisory boards, including DACOWITS. On September 24, 2025, DACOWITS was terminated by Hegseth, who stated that the committee was “advancing a divisive feminist agenda that hurts combat readiness”.

== Formation ==
The Women's Armed Services Integration Act of 1948 established specific roles for women in the peacetime Armed Forces of the United States. Previously, women had only been allowed to serve as nurses in peacetime with a wider variety of roles only open to them in time of war. However, with the start of the Korean War in June 1950, the DoD began to investigate ways to increase recruitment and retention of women in all services. Internal inquiries from defense agencies, such as the National Security Resources Board, and external pressure from politicians, such as Senator Margaret Chase Smith, added to the sense of urgency in defining a more comprehensive position for women in the military.

At the suggestion of Assistant Secretary of Defense for Manpower Anna Rosenberg, Marshall formed the Defense Advisory Committee on Women in the Services in August 1951. Its first chair was Mary Pillsbury Lord, a civic activist who had been chair of the National Civilian Advisory Committee of the Women's Army Corps (WAC). Some of its original members included Oveta Culp Hobby, the first WAC director; Mildred McAfee Horton, former director of the Women Accepted for Volunteer Emergency Service (WAVES); Ruth Streeter, former director of the Women Marines; actress Helen Hayes; Sarah G. Blanding, Vassar College president; engineer Lillian Gilbreth; and publisher Beatrice Gould. Meeting for three days at the Pentagon in 1951, they heard presentations about recruiting and the possible need for a women's draft based on the failure of recruiting during World War II to meet the military services' requirements for women. The committee helped to develop policies and standards for women in the military—using them, expanding their opportunities, recruiting them, and training them. The committee ensured that military women would have representation at the Department of Defense.

== Later operations ==
Over the years, the DACOWITS charter expanded, enabling the committee to submit numerous recommendations to the SecDef. The majority of proposals were either fully or partially implemented. DACOWITS made significant contributions on topics including the opening of closed positions to women; improvements to the health of deployed servicewomen; increased marketing, accession, and recruitment of women; and increased parental leave authorizations.

=== Membership ===
Committee members included leaders with diverse, inclusive, and varied backgrounds from academia, industry, private and public sectors, and other professions. Membership selection was on the basis of experience with the military or with women-related workforce issues. Members were appointed for a 4-year term of service (renewed annually), served without compensation, and performed a variety of duties, which included: visiting military installations; conducting a review and evaluation of research on women; and developing a comprehensive annual report with recommendations for consideration by the Secretary of Defense. Of note, Committee members were appointed to serve as independent advisors, not as official representatives of any group or organization with which they were affiliated.

=== Reports and recommendations ===
DACOWITS gathered information from multiple sources, including briefings and written responses from DoD, Service-level military representatives, and subject matter experts. The committee collected qualitative data from focus groups and interactions with Service members representing the Air Force, Army, Marine Corps, Navy, and Coast Guard during installation visits. Additionally, the committee examined peer-reviewed literature. Based upon the data collected and analyzed, the committee submitted recommendations and continuing concerns to the SecDef.

=== Service liaisons and other defense points of contact ===
In accordance with Department of Defense Instruction (DoDI) 5105.04, “Department of Defense Federal Advisory Committee Management Program,” dated August 6, 2007, and Deputy Secretary of Defense memorandum, “Advisory Committee Management,” dated November 26, 2018, the Military Services designated a Service Liaison to DACOWITS. Service Liaisons attended each DACOWITS quarterly business meeting for the entire duration of the public meeting; responded to all DACOWITS requests for information; and ensured the information provided to DACOWITS received appropriate security reviews prior to the release of any public disclosure of information. Other Defense points of contact were designated through the Under Secretary of Defense for Personnel and Readiness.

== Committee chairs ==
DACOWITS Chairs, 1951 to 2025
Term	Chair
1951	Mrs. Mary Pillsbury Lord
1952–1953	Lena Ebeling
1954	Eve Rawlinson Lee
1955	Evelyn Crowther
1956–1957	Margaret Divver
1958	Murray Pearce Hurley
1959	Janet P. Tourtellotte
1960	Margaret Drexel Biddle
1961	Lucia Myers
1962	Nona Quarles
1963	Margaret J. Gilkey
1964	Betty M. Hayenga
1965	Elinor Guggenheimer
1966	Agnes O’Brien Smith
1967	Dr. Minnie C. Miles
1968	Dr. Geraldine P. Woods
1969	Dr. Hester Turner
1970	Dr. Majorie S. Dunlap
1971	Helen K. Leslie
1972	Estelle M. Stacy
1973	Fran A. Harris
1974	Wilma C. Rogalin
1975	Nita D. Veneman
1976	Judith Nixon Turnbull
1977-1978	Piilani C. Desha
1979-1980	Sally K. Richardson
1981	Dr. Gloria D. Scott
1982	Maria Elena Torralva
1983	Dr. Mary Evelyn Blagg Huey
1984	Anne L. Schulze
1985	Constance Berry Newman
1986-1988	Dr. Jacquelyn K. Davis
1989	Dr. Connie S. Lee
1990	Meredith A. Neizer
1991	Becky Costantino
1992	Jean Appleby Jackson
1993	Ellen P. Murdoch
1994	Wilma Powell
1995	Sue Ann Tempero
1996	Holly K. Hemphill
1997	Dr. Judith Youngman
1998	Elizabeth T. Bilby
1999	Mary Wamsley
2000-2001	Vickie L. McCall
2002-2005	Lieutenant General (Retired) Carol A. Mutter, U.S. Marine Corps
2006-2009	Mary Nelson
2010-2011	Lieutenant General (Retired) Claudia J. Kennedy, U.S. Army
2012-2014	Holly K. Hemphill
2014-2016	Lieutenant General (Retired) Frances Wilson, U.S. Marine Corps
2016-2021	General (Retired) Janet C. Wolfenbarger, U.S. Air Force
2022-2025	Shelly O'Neill Stoneman

== Recommendations ==
DACOWITS’ recommendations addressed a variety of topics and subtopics throughout the years. The table below lists the most common topics of concern the committee addressed.

Common themes and subthemes addressed in DACOWITS recommendations, 1967 to 2020
Themes & subthemes	Description
Benefits and entitlements	Benefits, salary, or entitlements received by current or former Service members
Base allowance for quarters	Housing allowances
Housing	Housing on or off base for Service members
Tricare	Healthcare for service members
Career progression	Career progression of a Service member, including career planning and trajectories, transitions and/or assistance related to assignments and placements, and leadership development
Deployment	Transitions related to deployments
Reintegration	Transitions related to reintegration after returning from deployments
Pregnancy status	Transitions related to pregnancy status
Transition between Active and Reserve Components	Transitions related to members of the Reserve or Guard moving to active duty status or active duty Service members moving to the Reserve or Guard
Veterans	Transitions related to separating from the U.S. military and moving to veteran status; also includes general recommendations related to veterans
Promotion and/or career advancement	Career advancement, promotion criteria, and performance evaluations
Enlistment	Standards or practices used around enlistment
Leadership development and representation	Initiatives for leadership or mentoring development, including both individual members of the U.S. military (developing their personal leadership skills) and the Military Services’ leadership as a whole (e.g., strengthening officer training); also includes diversity (e.g., race, gender, ethnicity) initiatives for underrepresented leaders, including at the executive/advisory board level
Communication and/or dissemination	Communication or dissemination of information from the branches or DoD to Service members and/or civilians; for example, “increase effective communication”
Education and/or training	Education or training
Basic training	Basic or recruit training
Military Service Academies (MSA)	Education and trainings conducted at MSAs
Youth programming	Education and trainings for children younger than 18
Reserve Officers' Training Corps (ROTC)	ROTC or Junior ROTC programs
New training or conferences	Creation and/or implementation of new trainings or organization of conferences
Modifications to existing training or conferences	Expanding or modifying existing trainings or conferences
Family support	Policies aimed at supporting families and their dependents
Child care	Child care
Domestic abuse	Domestic abuse
Dual-military couples	Spouses who both are current Service members; includes co-location policies for such couples
Family leave policies	Parental or family leave policies that allow Service members to take leave when having/adopting a child
Sabbaticals	Sabbatical programs that allow Service members to take leave to pursue other areas of life
Gender equality and integration	Equalizing standards or guidelines for genders, including integrating women into previously closed positions or units, and barriers preventing full integration; also includes utilization OR increasing the number/percentage of women in underrepresented fields
Women in combat	Integrating women into previously closed combat positions
Gender bias	Gender bias or sexism involving any prejudice or stereotyping based on gender or sex
Physical fitness standards	Completion, implementation, and components of physical fitness tests or the discussion of physical fitness test requirements; body specifications, measurements and scales, and physical ability requirements deemed necessary for adequate job performance
Uniforms and equipment	Uniforms and equipment used by female Service members
Reserve and Guard components	Reserve or Guard, specifically
Internal to DACOWITS	DACOWITS processes or the dissemination of information pertaining to DACOWITS
Marketing and recruitment	Media or programs specifically designed to promote a given entity (e.g., the Military Services) or related to the recruitment of female Service members
Portrayal of female Service members in media	Depiction and representation of female Service members in the media (e.g., print, video, television, stamps, radio)
Retention	Female attrition and retention
Sexual harassment and sexual assault	Both sexual harassment and sexual assault
Sexual harassment	Related to sexual harassment, but not sexual assault
Sexual assault	Related to sexual assault, but not sexual harassment
Unit culture and morale	Unit culture or morale
Women's health and well-being	Women's health, including reproductive health
Breastfeeding and lactation	Breastfeeding and lactation policies, programs, or support
Mental health	Mental health, including drug or alcohol abuse and posttraumatic stress
Pregnancy	Pregnancy, including postpartum
