= Don't Let that Shadow Touch Them =

1942 artwork by Lawrence Beall Smith

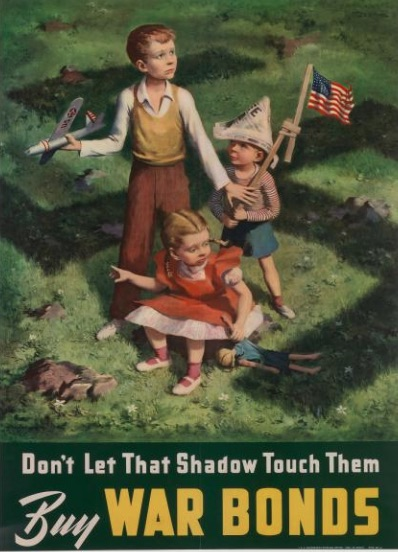
- Artist: Lawrence Beall Smith
- Year: 1942
- Medium: lithograph

Don't Let that Shadow Touch Them is a U.S. War Bond poster created by Lawrence Beall Smith in 1942, created in support of the U.S. war effort upon America's entry into World War II. It features three young children, apprehensive and fearful, as they are enveloped by the large, dark arm of a swastika shadow. The poster was distributed by the United States Treasury Department and implied that purchasing war bonds would keep the children safe from the Nazi threat. War bonds were offered by the United States Government for purchase by the public; purchasers would keep the bond and be reimbursed for its return at a later date. Purchasing bonds was considered patriotic and an investment in victory. U.S. posters tended to focus on patriotic themes and appeals to emotion to garner support. This poster was one in a series of war bond posters that resulted from a wartime partnership between Abbott Laboratories and the U.S. Treasury. Abbott Laboratories also recruited artists to document the work of the military branches during the war. Smith was one of more than two dozen artists sponsored by Abbott and hosted by the War Department to serve in battle as a combat artist. In 1943, Smith spent three months on aircraft carriers in the Caribbean and the Mediterranean, creating works on naval aviation operations. In 1944, he was sent to England to document the Medical Corps’ work there. He volunteered to stay beyond his tour in order to witness the Normandy invasion in June. By the end of the war, 85 million Americans had purchased over $185 billion in war bonds.
