= Laura Cuppy Smith =

American spiritualist

Laura Cuppy Smith (c. 1833 -1882) was a spiritualist who was one of the first activists in California's woman suffrage movement.

== Personal life ==
Of English ancestry, Laura Cuppy was born in France. She immigrated to Canada as a child. With her first husband, Harvey McAlpine, she immigrated to the United States. Her first husband committed suicide. Her second husband was named Smith, and her third husband was a man called Kendrick. She was the mother of at least one child, born sometime around 1870.

== Activism ==
By the early 1860s, Cuppy was a well-known trance medium in Ohio.

After the Civil War, she emigrated to California, where she advocated both spiritualism and woman suffrage in public lectures. Her lectures on spiritualism drew large crowds in San Francisco in the 1860s and 1870s.

In March of 1870, California's woman suffragists petitioned the California State Legislature in support of woman suffrage, the first organized attempt at getting a suffrage law passed in the state. Cuppy was chosen to address the legislature in support of the cause, thus becoming one of the first women ever to address that body. She attended national suffrage conventions in 1872, and supported Victoria Woodhull in her presidential campaign.

Later in life, she moved to Boston, where she supported the cause of Ezra Haywood, when he was arrested on charges of obscenity.
