= Larry G. Smith (United States Army) =

United States Army major general

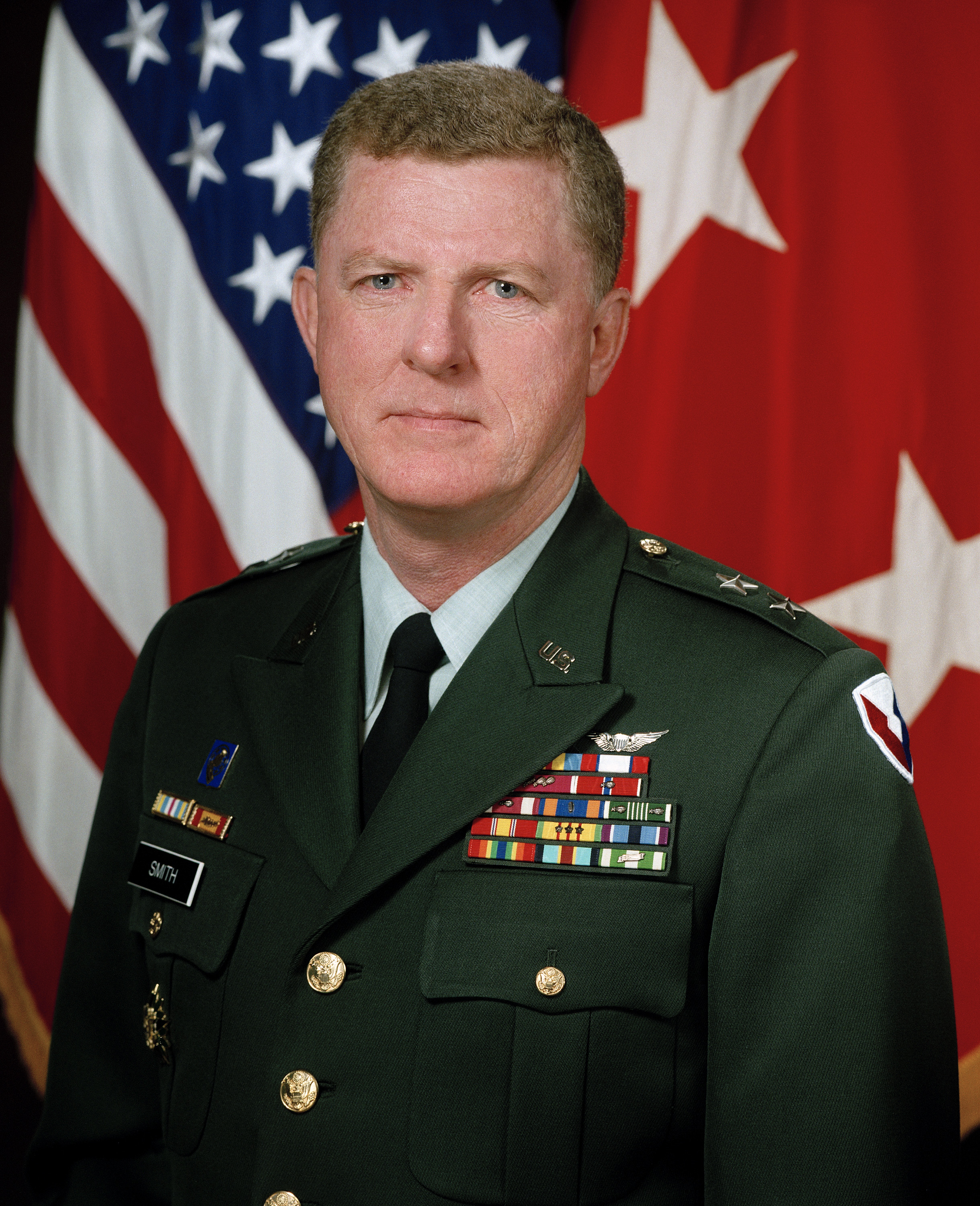
- Smith in 1997
- Born: August 11, 1944 (age 82); Bonneville, Mississippi, U.S.
- Military career
- Allegiance: United States
- Branch: United States Army
- Service years: 1966–2000
- Rank: Major General
- Commands: 3rd Battalion, 34th Armor, 1st Armored Division (United States); United States Army Security Assistance Command
- Awards: Defense Distinguished Service Medal; Distinguished Service Medal; Legion of Merit with 4 Oak Leaf Clusters

Larry G. Smith (born August 11, 1944) is a retired United States Army major general who last served as the Commanding General of the United States Army Security Assistance Command. After an unsuccessful appointment to become Inspector General in 1999, Smith retired the following year. General Smith's retirement in 2000 marked the end of 34 years of military service.

== Military career ==
Smith was born on August 11, 1944, in Bonneville, Mississippi. In 1966, Smith graduated from the Army Reserve Officers' Training Corps (AROTC) program through Western Kentucky University, where he studied military science and strategic leadership. He was inducted into WKU's ROTC Hall of Fame.

Smith served as commander of the 3rd Battalion, 34th Armor in the 1st Armored Division while in Germany. He worked overseas as Assistant Chief of Staff for Plans and Policy while in Southern Europe. During June 1995, Smith served as program manager of modernization for the Saudi Arabian National Guard. His later work in the American states included working in Washington, D.C., as a staff member of the Tank Programs, Ground Combat Systems Division. Smith also served as a staff member in the Office of the Deputy Chief of Staff for Research, Development and Acquisition. His most senior office position was as the Commanding General of the United States Army Security Assistance Command.

=== Accusation made by another general ===
In 1999, Smith submitted his name for appointment to Army deputy inspector general. Knowing one of the position's responsibilities included investigating sexual harassment claims, fellow officer Lieutenant General Claudia J. Kennedy notified her superiors upon learning of Smith's impending promotion. She pressed a charge of sexual harassment against Smith who she alleged groped and kissed her three years earlier in 1996. The unwanted advance occurred while Kennedy was a Major General and Smith was a Brigadier General.

In 2000, the Army's Inspector General publicly released the results of its inquiry. Despite General Smith steadfastly maintaining his innocence, the inquiry found him guilty, based on Kennedy's credibility. Subsequently, Smith's appointment was withdrawn. Due to his dismay with the Army's ruling, General Smith requested early retirement in 2000.

== Awards and decorations ==
Smith's awards include the Defense Distinguished Service Medal, the Distinguished Service Medal and the Legion of Merit with 4 Oak Leaf Clusters.
