= Lawrence Beall Smith =

20th-century American painter

- Born: October 2, 1909; Washington, D.C., United States
- Died: 1995; Cross River, New York, United States
- Known for: Painting

Lawrence Beall Smith (October 2, 1909 – 1995) was an American painter, illustrator, sculptor and lithographer. Examples of his original lithographs, paintings and sculpture are included in the permanent collections of such major galleries as the Metropolitan Museum of Art, Addison Gallery of American Art, Fogg Art Museum, Harvard University, the University of Chicago, the University of Minnesota, the Fine Arts Museums of San Francisco, the National Gallery of Art, and the Library of Congress. The art collections of the United States Air Force and United States Navy, both in Washington, D.C., hold examples of Smith's paintings and prints depicting World War II.

== Early life ==
Smith's early childhood was spent in the Carolinas, Kentucky, Illinois and Indiana, moving with his family for his father's work in the United States Military. He studied art at the Art Institute of Chicago and at the University of Chicago, where he received his Ph.B. (Bachelor of Philosophy) in 1931.

Smith began exhibiting his art in 1935 and gained a strong national reputation by 1941 when a one-man exhibition of his art was launched at the Whitney Museum of American Art in New York.

== Associated American Artists ==
Starting in the 1930s, Smith was commissioned to create work for Associated American Artists, and became one of their most prolific and successful lithographers, creating work alongside the likes of Thomas Hart Benton, Grant Wood, and John Steuart Curry. Smith created sold out works for the AAA through the 1970s.

== World War II ==
At the start America's entry into World War II, Smith created posters for the war effort.

Subsequently, through his connection with the Associated American Artists, Smith was sponsored by Abbott Laboratories and hosted by the War Department to serve in battle as a combat artist. In 1943, Smith spent three months on aircraft carriers in the Caribbean and the Mediterranean, creating works on naval aviation operations. In 1944, he was sent to England to document the Medical Corps’ work there. He volunteered to stay beyond his tour in order to contribute to and witness for posterity the Normandy invasion. His paintings created on the battlefield are the only first-hand D-Day artworks in existence.

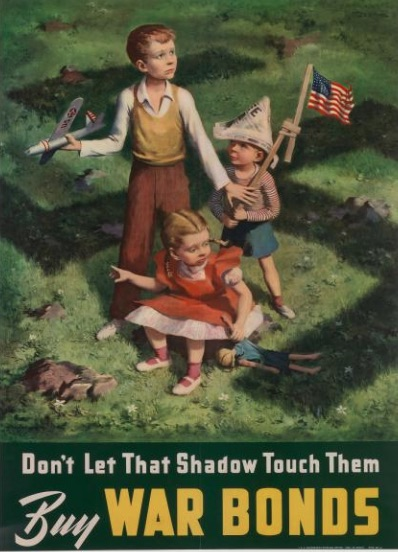
Don't Let that Shadow Touch Them (1942) War Bonds Poster by Lawrence Beall Smith

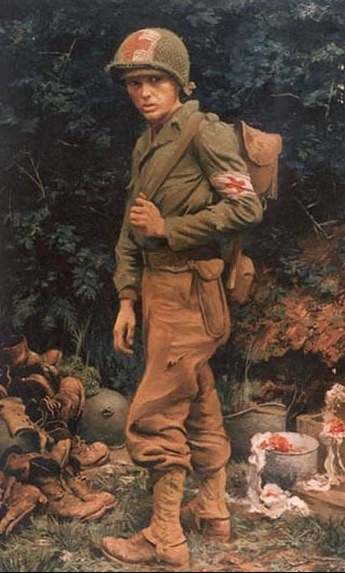
"The Man without a Gun" (1944, Normandy) - painting by Lawrence Beall Smith

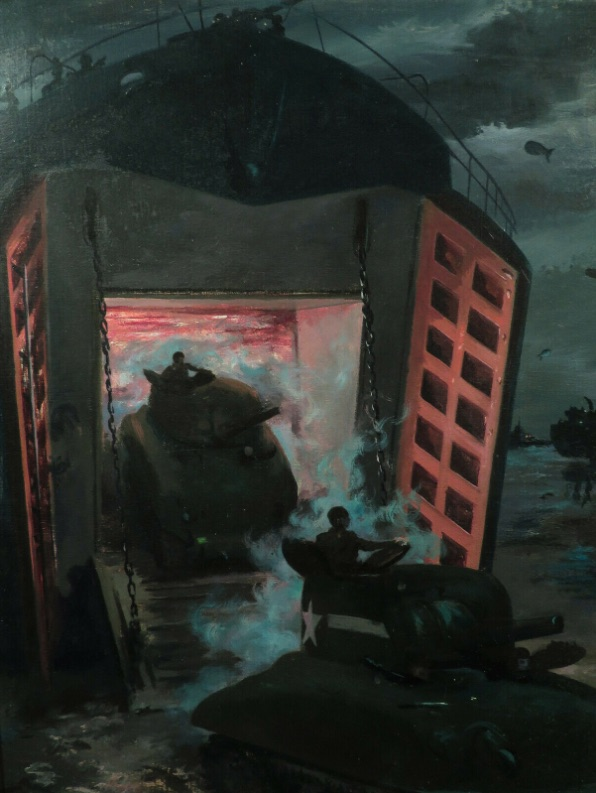
"Monsters at Omaha Beach" (1944, Normandy) - painting by Lawrence Beall Smith
