= Lorraine Smith Pangle =

American philosopher

- Born: April 26, 1958 (age 68)
- Spouse: Thomas Pangle

Philosophical work
- Era: 21st century Philosophy
- Region: Western philosophy
- Main interests: political philosophy, philosophy of friendship, ethics

Lorraine Smith Pangle (born April 26, 1958) is a professor of political philosophy in the Department of Government and co-director of the Thomas Jefferson Center for the Study of Core Texts and Ideas at the University of Texas at Austin. Her interests are ancient, early modern, and American political philosophy, ethics, the philosophy of education, and problems of justice and moral responsibility. She has won fellowships from the Searle, Olin, and Earhart Foundations, the Social Sciences and Humanities Research Council of Canada, and the National Endowment for the Humanities. Pangle received her B.A. in history from Yale, a B.Ed. from the University of Toronto, and her PhD from University of Chicago in 1999. She is married to Thomas Pangle.

== Books ==
- Reason and Character: The Moral Foundations of Aristotelian Political Philosophy, University of Chicago Press, 2020
- Virtue Is Knowledge: The Moral Foundations of Socratic Political Philosophy, University of Chicago Press, 2014
- The Political Philosophy of Benjamin Franklin (The Political Philosophy of the American Founders), Johns Hopkins, 2007
- Aristotle and the Philosophy of Friendship, Cambridge, 2003
- The Learning of Liberty: The Educational Ideas of the American Founders (with Thomas Pangle). University Press of Kansas, 1993

== See also ==
- Benjamin Franklin
- Aristotelian ethics
- Moral intellectualism
