= Laurence D. Smith =

Laurence D. Smith (October 28, 1950) is an American psychologist, historian of psychology, philosopher of science, and emeritus professor at the University of Maine. He was trained in history and philosophy of science at Indiana University (M.A., 1975) and history of psychology at the University of New Hampshire (Ph.D., 1982). Smith is a fellow of the American Psychological Association.

Smith's work on the history of behaviorism showed that the major American neobehaviorists flirted with logical positivism as an allied movement, but wound up rejecting it in favor of their own psychologistic epistemologies that grew out of American pragmatism. Along with the psychologists D. Alan Stubbs and Lisa A. Best, he later investigated the use of "inscription devices" (graphs, tables, and diagrams) by psychologists and other scientists. The finding that the use of graphical inscriptions in various disciplines is highly correlated with measures of their scientificity (their "hardness" as sciences) served to confirm Bruno Latour's thesis that graphs are essential to the practices and successes of science, largely due to their communication efficiency and rhetorical power.

== Selected publications ==
- Smith, L. D. (1986). Behaviorism and logical positivism: A reassessment of the alliance. Stanford, CA: Stanford University Press.
- Smith, L. D., & Woodward, W. R. (Eds.). (1996). B. F. Skinner and behaviorism in American culture. Bethlehem, PA: Lehigh University Press.
- Smith, L. D. (1992). On prediction and control: B. F. Skinner and the technological ideal of science. American Psychologist, 47, 216–223.
- Smith, L.D., Best, L. A., Stubbs, D. A., Johnston, J., & Archibald, A. B. (2000). Scientific graphs and the hierarchy of the sciences: A Latourian survey of inscription practices. Social Studies of Science, 30, 73–94.
- Smith, L. D., Best, L. A., Stubbs, D. A., Archibald, A. B., & Roberson-Nay, R. (2002). Constructing knowledge: The role of graphs and tables in hard and soft psychology. American Psychologist, 57, 749–761.
