= Lorenzo Smith =

American singer-songwriter

- Born: May 23, 1972 (age 54); Havana, Florida, US
- Origin: Jacksonville, Florida
- Genres: R&B
- Occupation: singer
- Instrument: vocals
- Years active: 1990–present
- Labels: Alpha International, Luke Records

Lorenzo Smith (born May 23, 1972) is an American singer-songwriter who has released three albums.

== Biography ==
Lorenzo Smith was born on May 23, 1972, in Havana, Florida. As a child, he sang in the churches and was an avid listener of Michael Jackson, El Debarge, James Brown and Sam Cooke. In high school, Lorenzo was active and competed in sports, a fact reflected by his strong build. he was also able to hone his vocal skills from his gospel roots, he was also influenced by other musicians such as Luther Vandross, Otis Redding, Will Downing, Freddie Jackson and among others from which smith’s mother liked. Still in his teens he got a record deal with Alpha International records.

In 1990, Lorenzo put out his first album, Let Me Show You. The album was released with Alpha International through Capitol Records. The album's title track reached No. 64 on the R&B charts, while the album's other single "Tic Tok" reached No. 41, his second single was “Let Me Show U” and his third single was “Angel” it was the only music video of the album.

In 1992, Lorenzo's eponymous sophomore effort,“Lorenzo”, peaked at No. 24 on Billboard R&b Albums Chart. the song "Real Love" reached No. 6 on the R&B charts; followed up with "Make Love 2 Me" and "I Can't Stand The Pain." which reached No. 21 and No. 22 on the R&B charts, respectively in 1992, also in 1992, Smith made live appearances on shows like Soul Train, Video Soul and on BET’s Teen Summit.

Lorenzo released his last album to date in 1995, after a three-year dispute with Alpha International. The album, Love on My Mind, was released on Luke Campbell's Luke Records. It had one charting single, "If It's Alright With You" which reached No. 41 on the R&B charts, but another single “Don’t Wanna Share” failed to chart. but in turn, Lorenzo would sang on Campbell album “Uncle Luke”.

As of 2015, Smith continues to perform and featured on the single "I Know (No More)" by Razor.

As of 2025, Lorenzo still does live performances in Florida today, he still performs his classic songs in music festivals and concerts in different areas of Florida.

== Discography ==
- Let Me Show You (Alpha International/Capitol, 1990)
- Lorenzo (Alpha International/Polydor, 1992)
- Love on My Mind (Luke, 1995)
