= Laura Alexandrine Smith =

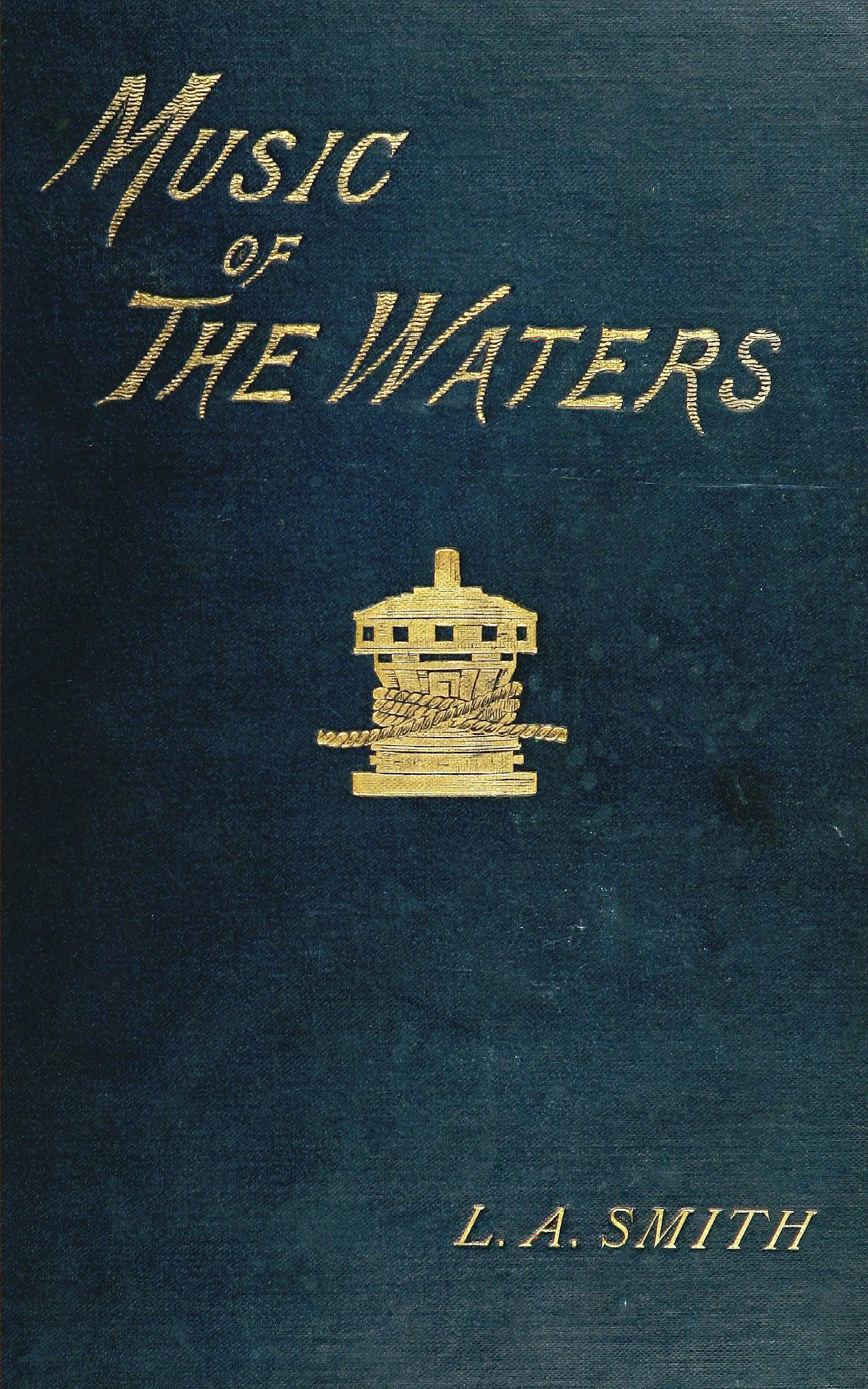
- Born: 1861; Newcastle upon Tyne
- Died: 1902 (aged 40–41); Whitechapel, London
- Resting place: Hampstead, London
- Occupations: Ethnomusicologist, musician, folk song collector, journalist
- Notable work: The Music of the Waters: A collection of the sailors' chanties, or working songs of the sea, of all maritime nations. Boatmen's, fishermen's, and rowing songs, and water legends

Laura Alexandrine Smith (1861–1902) was an English musician, ethnomusicologist and one of the earliest collectors of sea shanties. Smith's The Music of the Waters, published in 1888, was possibly the first collection of sea shanties to include music as well as words.

== Life ==
Laura Alexandrine Smith was born in Newcastle upon Tyne in 1861. Her father was the Russian vice-consul.

In 1888, Smith published The Music of the Waters: a Collection of the Sailors' Chanties, or Working Songs of the Sea, of All Maritime Nations; Boatmen's, Fishermen's, and Rowing Songs, and Water Legends. She had been commissioned by the editor of The Shipping World, and was described as: 'A thorough musician, a pleasing writer, and full of enthusiasm', and thus, 'specially fitted for the work'. The collection was of 'chanties', or working songs, rather than songs sung of the sea by those living and working on the land. These latter, Smith dismissed as tales of 'impossible ships in impracticable positions', where her working songs were sung to 'the booming double bass of the hollow topsails, and the multitudinous chorus of the ocean.' The collection was introduced by R. M. Ballantyne.

Following the success of Music of the Waters, Smith tried in the 1890s to compile a volume of soldiers' songs, 'at a time when the protests about vanishing army music hung heavily in the air'. She requested contributions in Notes and Queries, but received a disappointing lack of replies. A subsequent collection by John Farmer managed to gather thirteen.

In 1893, Smith sat on the advisory council of the women's branch of the World's Congress on Folk-lore.

Laura Alexandrine Smith died on 7 June 1902 in Whitechapel, London.

== Bibliography ==
- Music of the Waters: a Collection of the Sailors' Chanties, or Working Songs of the Sea, of All Maritime Nations; Boatmen's, Fishermen's, and Rowing Songs, and Water Legends (1888)
- 'Romany Songs' in Woman's World, Vol. 2, No. 3 (January 1889)
- Through Romany Songland (1889)
- The Crystal City under the Sea by André Laurie, translated from the French by Laura Alexandrine Smith (1896)
- 'Workers' Songs' in Nineteenth Century (August 1898)
