= Leslie F. Kenne =

US Air Force general

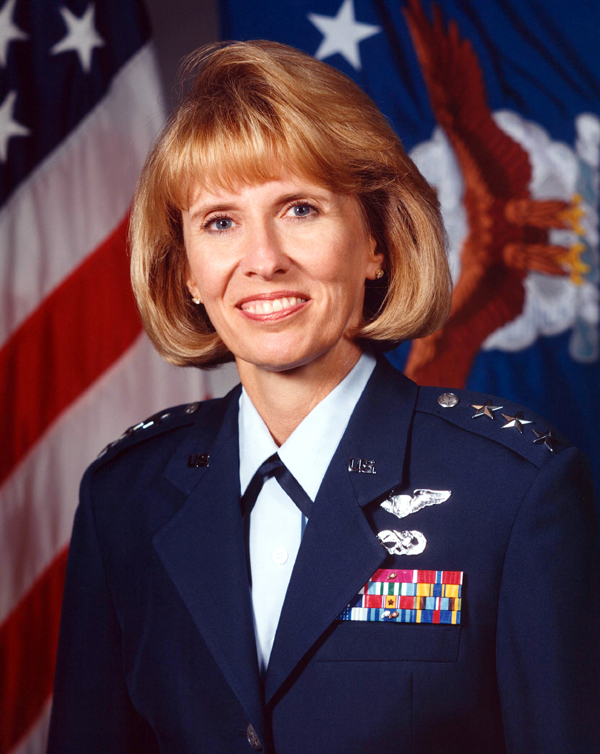
- Leslie F. Kenne
- Born: 1949 (age 76–77)
- Military career
- Allegiance: United States of America
- Branch: United States Air Force
- Service years: 1971–2003
- Rank: Lieutenant General
- Unit: U.S. Air Force Test Pilot School
- Commands: Electronic Systems Center
- Awards: Defense Distinguished Service Medal; Air Force Distinguished Service Medal (2); Legion of Merit (2); Bronze Star; Meritorious Service Medal (3)
- Other work: SRI International Board of Directors; Harris Corporation Board of Directors

Leslie F. Kenne is a retired lieutenant general in the United States Air Force, a rank she attained in 1999, and the first woman to attain that rank in the Air Force. She is currently on the board of directors of SRI International, Harris Corporation, Oshkosh Corporation and Unisys Corporation. Kenne also serves on the Air Force Studies Board's Development Planning Roundtable, part of the National Academy of Sciences.

A graduate of Auburn University, Kenne served in a variety of roles, including director of three major programs: the Low Altitude Navigation and Targeting Infrared System for Night, the F-16 and the F-35. She has won numerous awards, including the Air Force Distinguished Service Medal, the Defense Distinguished Service Medal, the Legion of Merit, the Bronze Star and the Meritorious Service Medal.

== Early life and education ==
In 1970, Kenne graduated from Auburn University with a degree in aerospace engineering and had participated in Auburn's ROTC program, and in 1971, she entered the Air Force. She served as a flight line maintenance officer in operations, and attended the U.S. Air Force Test Pilot School in 1974.

She would later attain a Master of Science in procurement management from Webster University.

== Early career ==
After graduating from the Test Pilot School, she served as a test and evaluation project manager, and in test and evaluation supervisory positions.

Kenne has served first as a division chief, and during a second tour, as a deputy director in the Office of the Assistant Secretary of the Air Force for Acquisition. She has directed three major programs—the Low Altitude Navigation and Targeting Infrared System for Night, the F-16 and the F-35.

She also has served as Vice Commander of Aeronautical Systems Center, Wright-Patterson Air Force Base, Ohio, and the Sacramento Air Logistics Center, McClellan Air Force Base, Calif. Prior to assuming her current position, Kenne commanded the Electronic Systems Center, Hanscom Air Force Base, Massachusetts.

== Later career ==
Kenne was Deputy Chief of Staff for Warfighting Integration, Headquarters United States Air Force, Washington, D.C. She was responsible to the United States Secretary of the Air Force and the Chief of staff for forming and executing policy and strategy to integrate command, control, communications, computers, intelligence, surveillance and reconnaissance capabilities to enable more effective employment of air and space power in support of national objectives.

General Kenne also provided guidance and direction to four field operating agencies: the Air Force Command and Control & Intelligence, Surveillance and Reconnaissance Center; the Air Force Communications Agency; the Air Force Spectrum Management Office; and the Air Force Agency for Modeling and Simulation. She retired from the United States Air Force on September 1, 2003.

In February 2008, she joined SRI International's board of directors. She also retired from Oshkosh's Board of directors starting February 2020. In 2009, she was inducted into the State of Alabama Engineering Hall of Fame.

== Effective dates of promotion ==
Insignia	Rank	Date
	Lieutenant general	July 1, 1999
	Major general	March 20, 1998
	Brigadier general	October 1, 1994
	Colonel	October 1, 1989
	Lieutenant colonel	March 1, 1985
	Major	October 24, 1980
	Captain	April 1, 1975
	First lieutenant	April 1, 1973
	Second lieutenant	Apr 1, 1971

== Personal life ==
She spent some portion of her adulthood in Ohio. She lives in Virginia.

== See also ==
- List of female United States military generals and flag officers
