= Patricia Ann Tracey =

United States naval officer (born 1950)

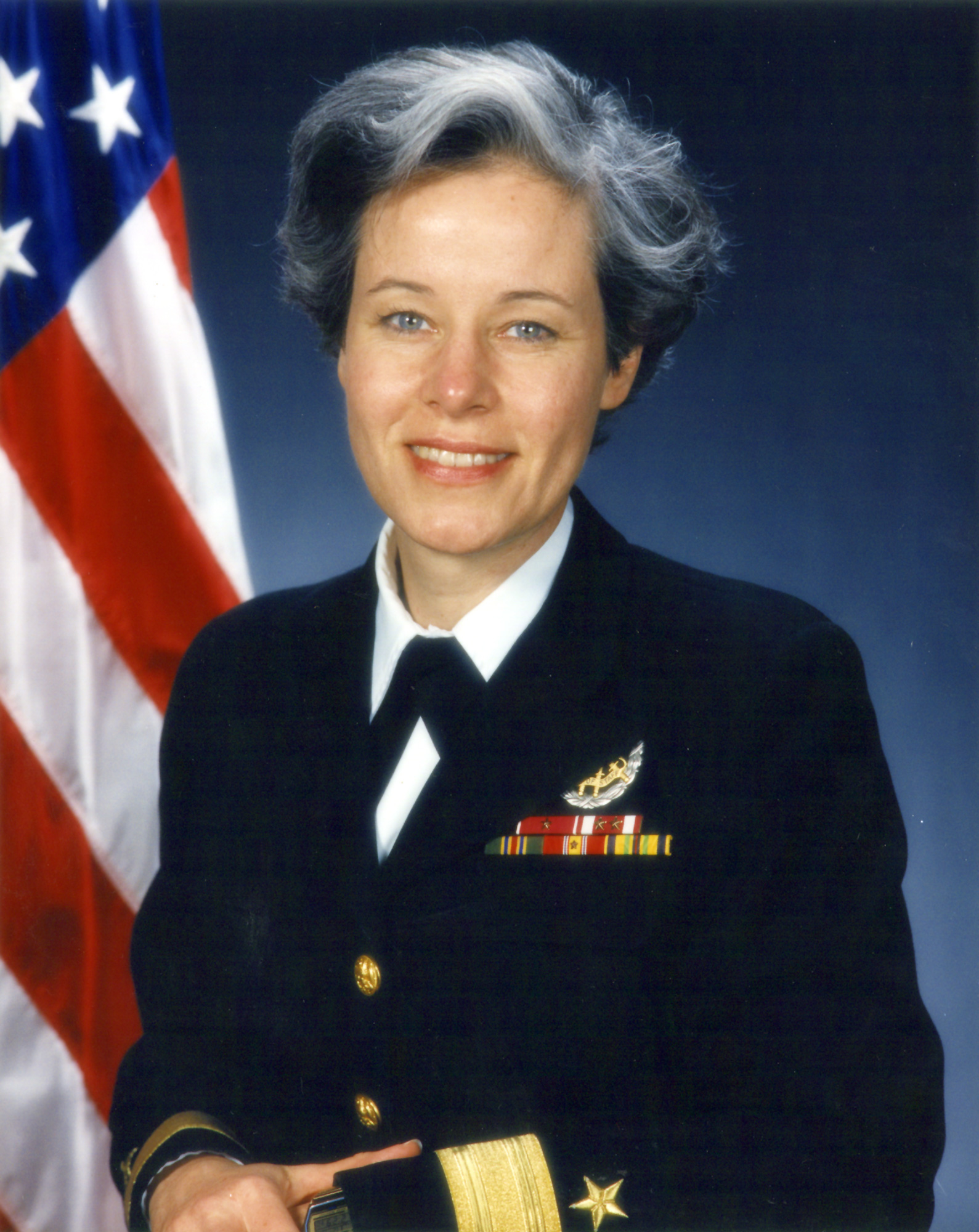
- Vice Admiral Patricia Tracey
- Born: November 30, 1950 (age 75); The Bronx, New York
- Spouse: Rick Metzer (m. 1977)
- Military career
- Allegiance: United States
- Branch: United States Navy
- Service years: 1970–2004
- Rank: Vice Admiral
- Commands: Chief of Naval Education and Training; Naval Station Long Beach
- Awards: Defense Distinguished Service Medal (2); Navy Distinguished Service Medal; Legion of Merit (3)

Patricia Ann Tracey (born November 30, 1950) is a retired United States naval officer and the first woman to be promoted to the rank of vice admiral in the United States Navy. She held the positions of chief of naval education and training (CNET) (1996–98), Deputy Assistant Secretary of Defense for Military Personnel Policy (1998–2001), and director of navy staff from 2001 until her retirement on October 1, 2004. At that time, she was also the all-time senior-ranking female officer in the United States military.

== Background ==
Tracey was born in The Bronx, New York. She graduated from the Academy of Mount St. Ursula High School in 1966 and from The College of New Rochelle with a Bachelor of Arts degree in mathematics. She completed Women's Officer Candidate School and was commissioned as an ensign in the United States Navy in 1970 in what was then known as the General Unrestricted Line officer designator (110X). She later earned a master's degree, with distinction, in operations research from the Naval Postgraduate School in Monterey, California.

== Navy career ==
Tracey's initial assignment in the United States Navy was to the Naval Space Surveillance Systems in Dahlgren, Virginia, where she qualified as a command center officer and orbital analyst. Following a tour on the staff of the Commander of the United States Pacific Fleet, she served at the Bureau of Naval Personnel as the placement officer for graduate education and service college students. From 1980 to 1982, Tracey served as an extended planning analyst in the Systems Analysis division on the Chief of Naval Operations’ staff. She served as executive officer of the Naval Recruiting District in Buffalo, New York, until 1984, where she was assigned as a manpower and personnel analyst in the Program Appraisal Division of the Chief of Naval Operations’ staff.

Tracey's first command tour was at the Naval Technical Training Center at Treasure Island, California, from 1986 to 1988, followed by a staff position with the Chief of Naval Personnel as the head of the Enlisted Plans and Community Management Branch. She served as commanding officer of Naval Station Long Beach, then the second largest homeport of the Pacific Fleet. Tracey became a Fellow with the Chief of Naval Operations Strategic Studies Group at the Naval War College in 1992. She was assigned as director for manpower and personnel on the staff of the Chairman of the Joint Chiefs of Staff, serving in this capacity from 1993 to 1995. She subsequently served from June 1995 to June 1996 as commander of the Naval Training Center, Great Lakes, home of a longstanding navy boot camp. Tracey was nominated for appointment to the grade of vice admiral and assignment as chief of naval education and training (CNET) and director of naval training, N7, Office of the Chief of Naval Operations in the Pentagon in May 1996. Tracey served in this position from 1996 to 1998. In September 1998, Tracey was assigned as deputy assistant secretary of Defense for Military Manpower and Personnel Policy, the Pentagon. In June 2001, Tracey was assigned as director, Navy Staff, N09B, Office of the Chief of Naval Operations, Pentagon. She retired from this billet on September 2, 2004.

== Personal life ==
Tracey married fellow naval officer Richard Metzer on September 10, 1977. After her retirement from the military, she joined HP Enterprise Services in 2006 and was their vice president of homeland security and defense in March 2015.

== Awards and decorations ==
Tracey's awards include:

- Defense Distinguished Service Medal (second award)
- Navy Distinguished Service Medal
- Legion of Merit (third award)
- Meritorious Service Medal (third award)

== See also ==
- Women in the United States Navy
- List of female United States military generals and flag officers
