= Sundial (disambiguation) =

A sundial is a timekeeping device.

Sundial or sun dial may also refer to:

== Sundials ==
- Analemmatic sundial, showing more than just the time of day
- Digital sundial, with digital display
- Scottish sundial, decorative sundials of the renaissance period
- Kirkdale sundial, Saxon sundial
- Whitehurst & Son sundial, very accurate sundial
- Carefree sundial, very large sundial in Arizona

== Places ==
- Sundial, West Virginia
- Sun Dial (restaurant), a revolving restaurant in Atlanta, Georgia
- Sundial (Olympic Mountains), a mountain in Washington state
- The Sundial (Zion), a mountain in Zion National Park, Utah

== Music ==
- Sun Dial (band), a British psychedelic rock band
- Sundial (album), a studio album by American hip hop artist Noname
- "Sundials" (song), a song by Alkaline Trio
- "Sundial", a song by Wolfmother from their 2009 album Cosmic Egg
- "Sundial", a song by Bicep from their 2021 album Isles
- "Sundial", EP by Mirah

== Publications ==
- The Sundial, novel by Shirley Jackson
- Sundial, novel by Catriona Ward
- Sundial Humor Magazine, a student satire publication at Ohio State University

== Other ==
- Sundial snail, the common name for mollusks in the Architectonicidae family
- Sundial, an amusement ride in Planet Coaster
- SUNDIAL, the codename of a proposed nuclear weapon with a yield of 10,000 megatons

== See also ==
- Solar dial, a type of electric timer switch
