= P107 (disambiguation) =

The P107 was a World War II French half-track.

P107 may also refer to:

- ARM Ignacio de la Llave (P107), a patrol boat of the Mexican Navy
- Papyrus 107, a biblical manuscript
- Phosco P107, a lamp standard
- Retinoblastoma-like protein 1
- P107, a state regional road in Latvia
