= Street light =

Raised source of light beside a road or path

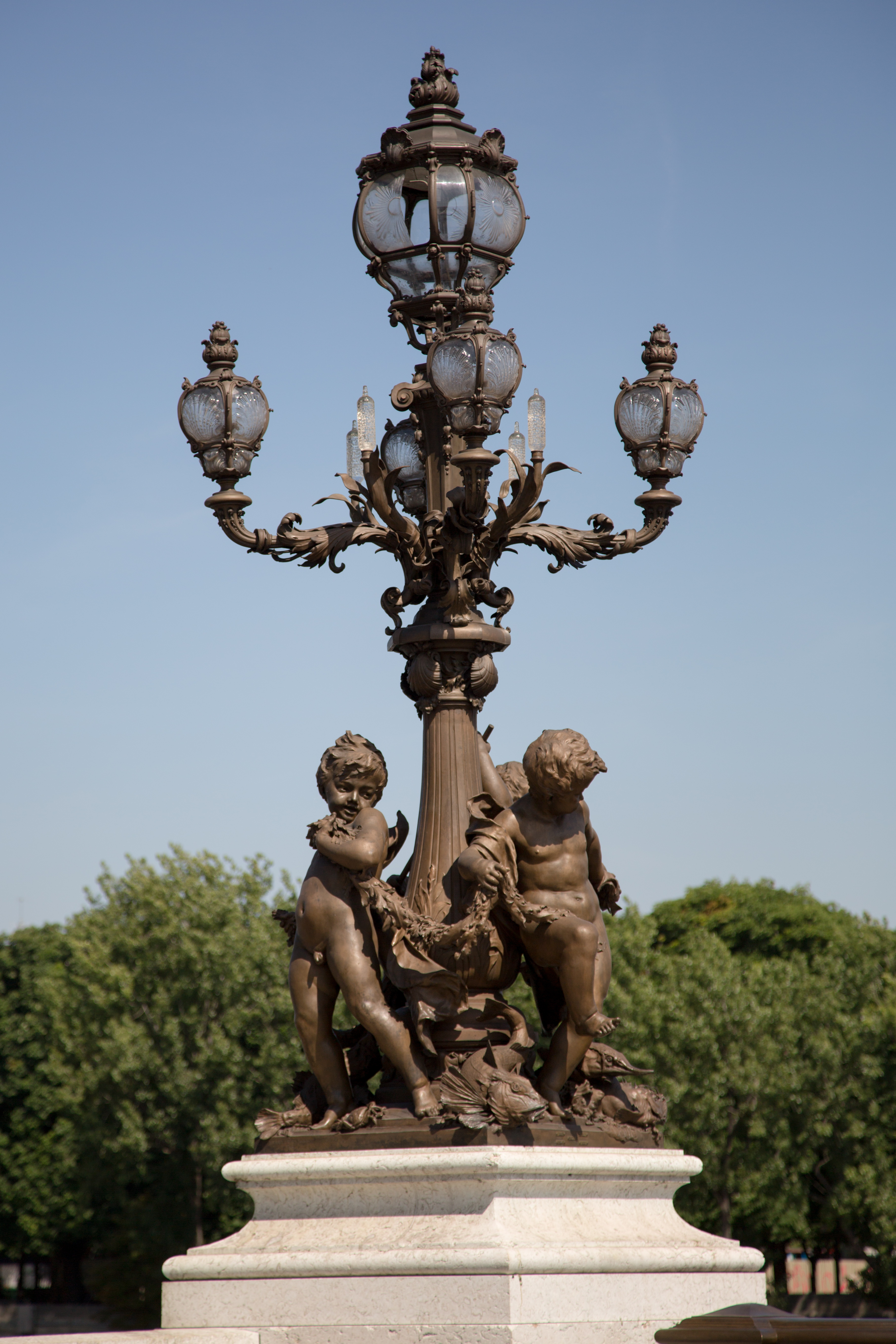
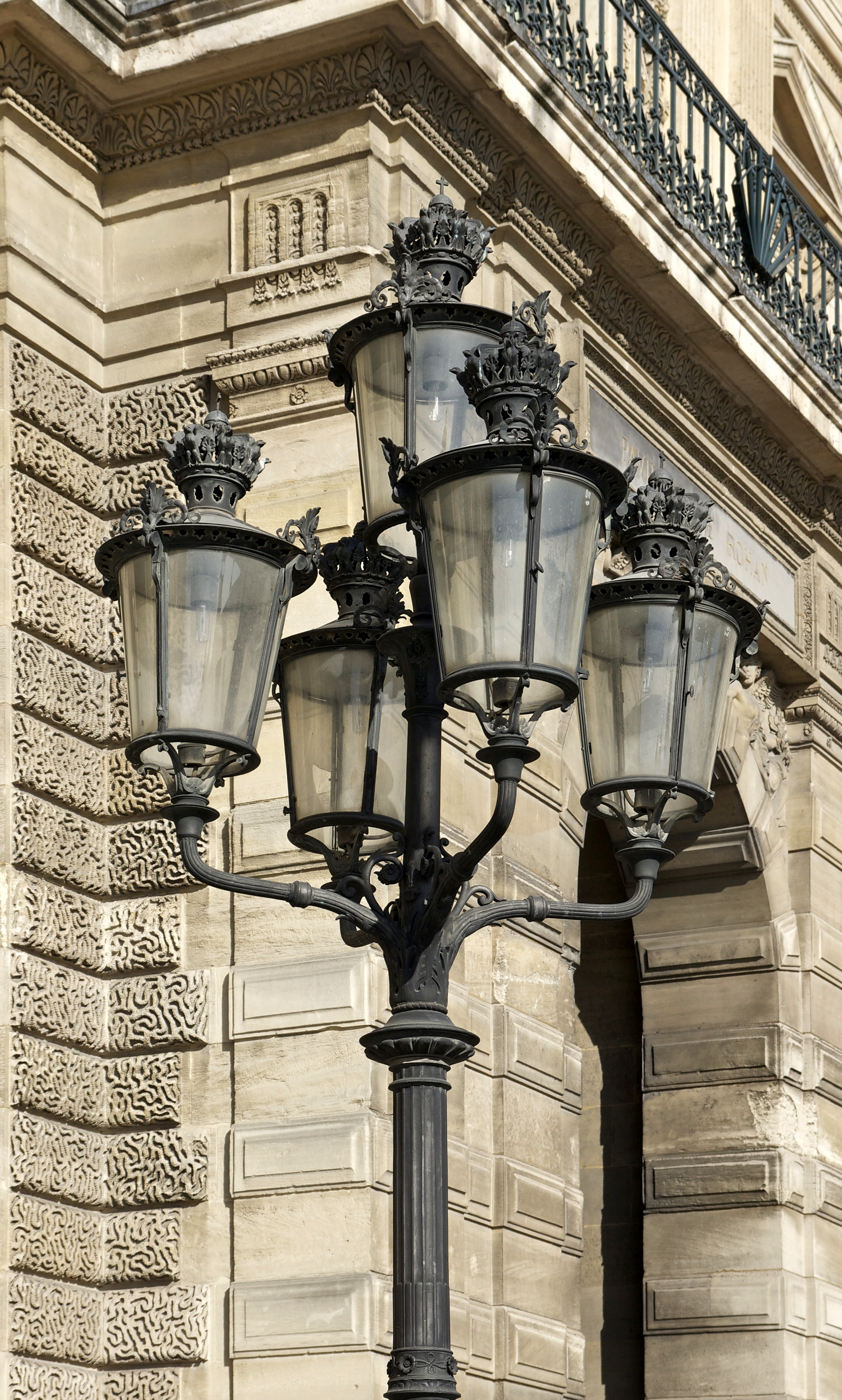
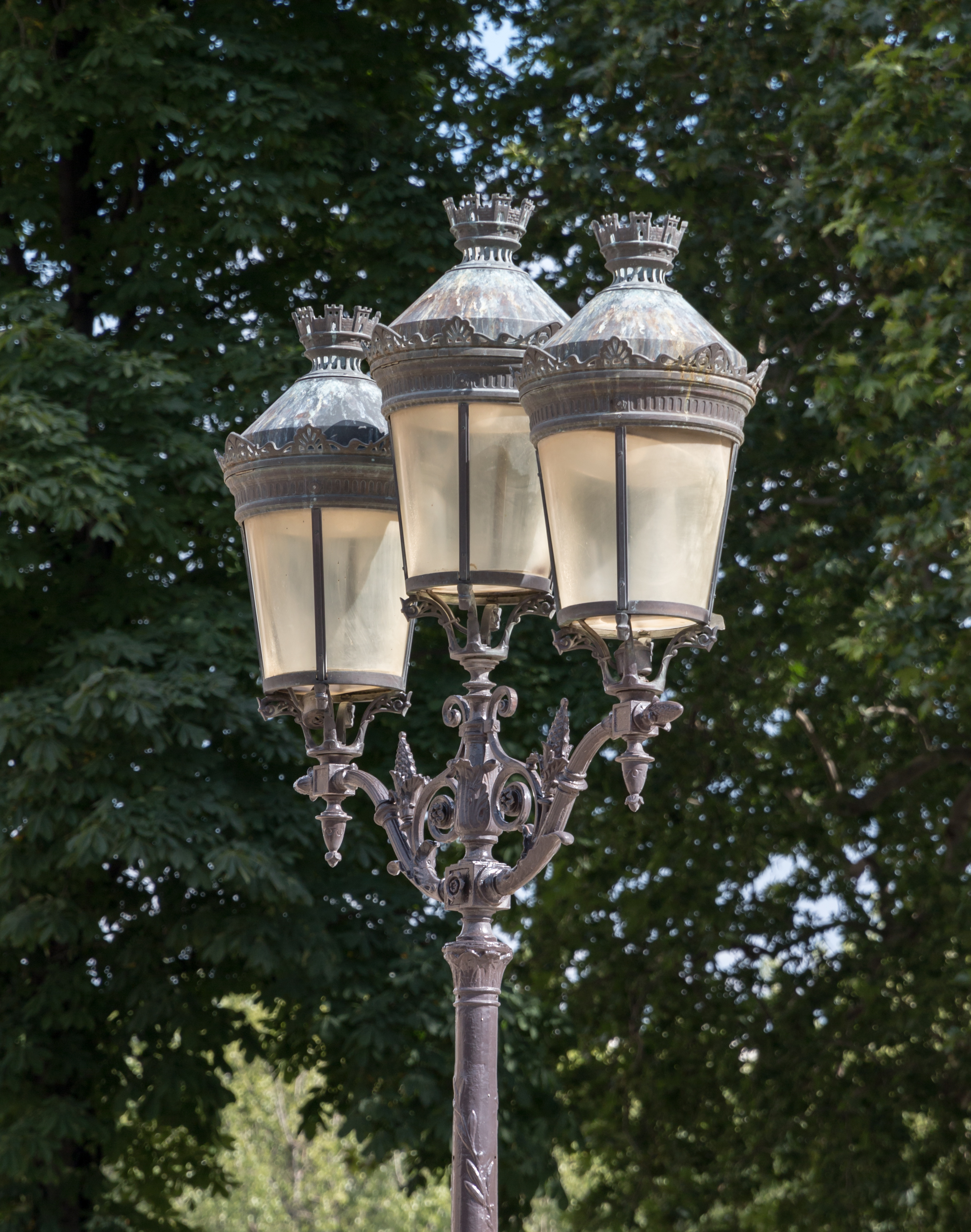
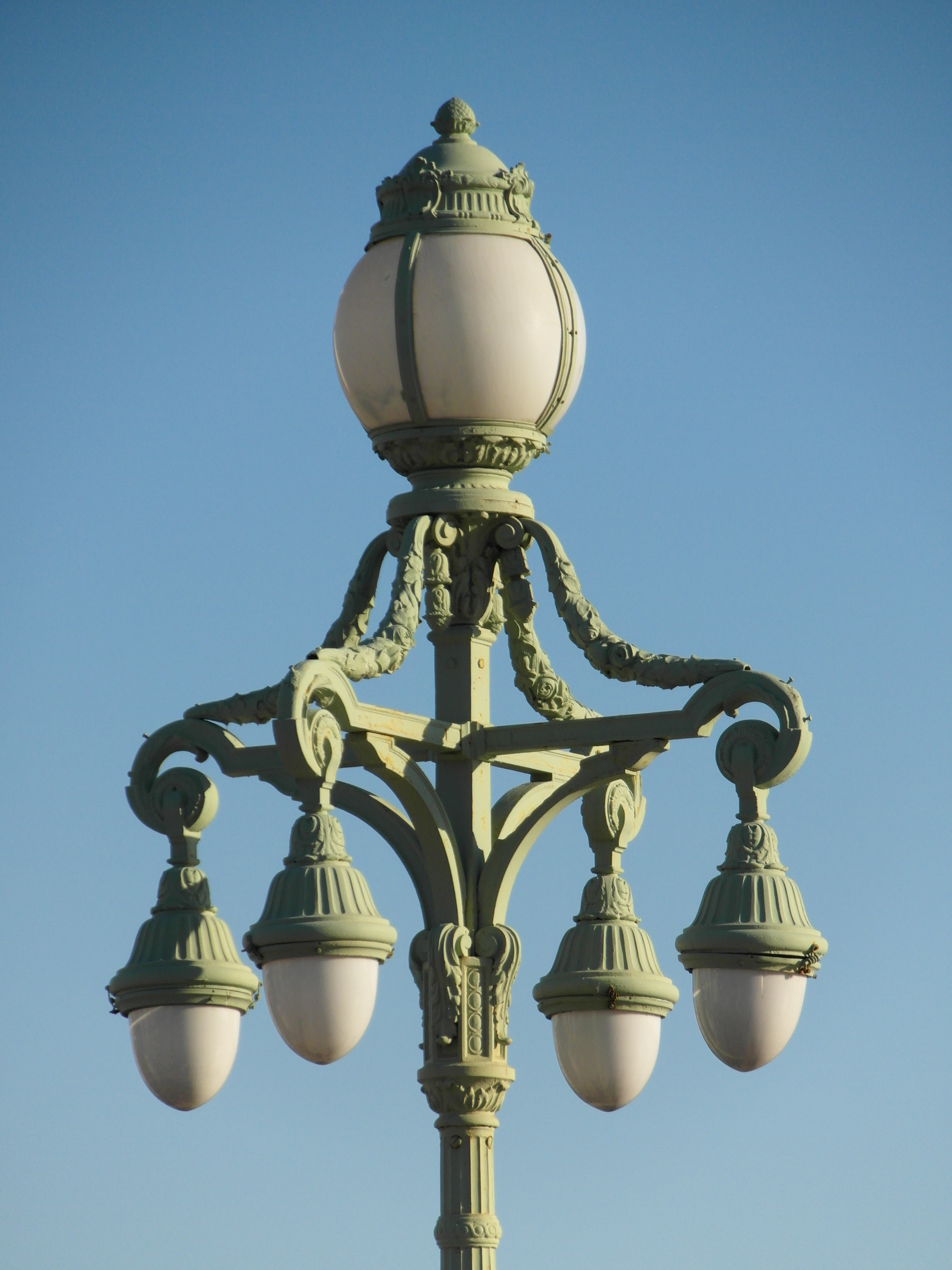
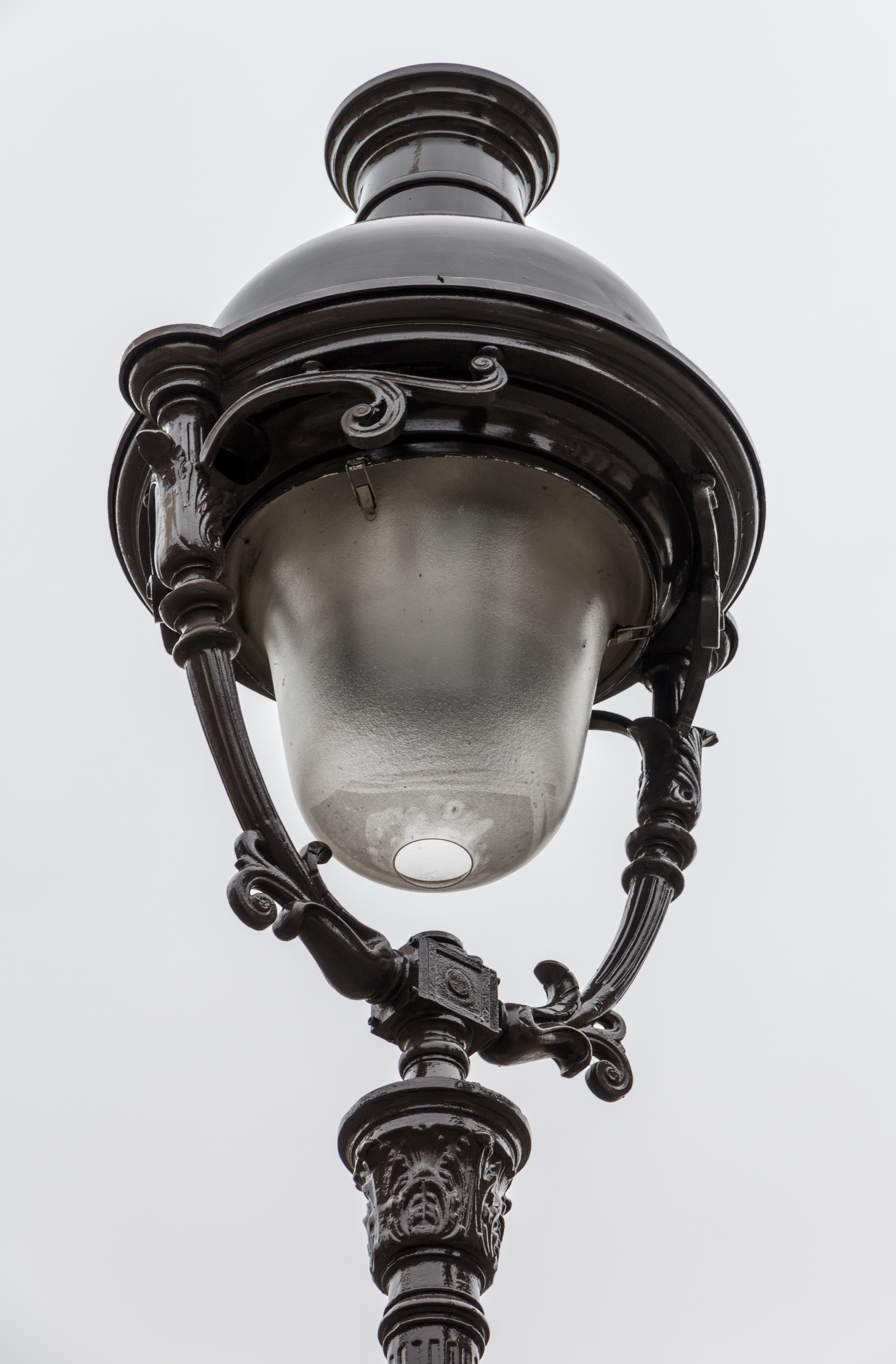
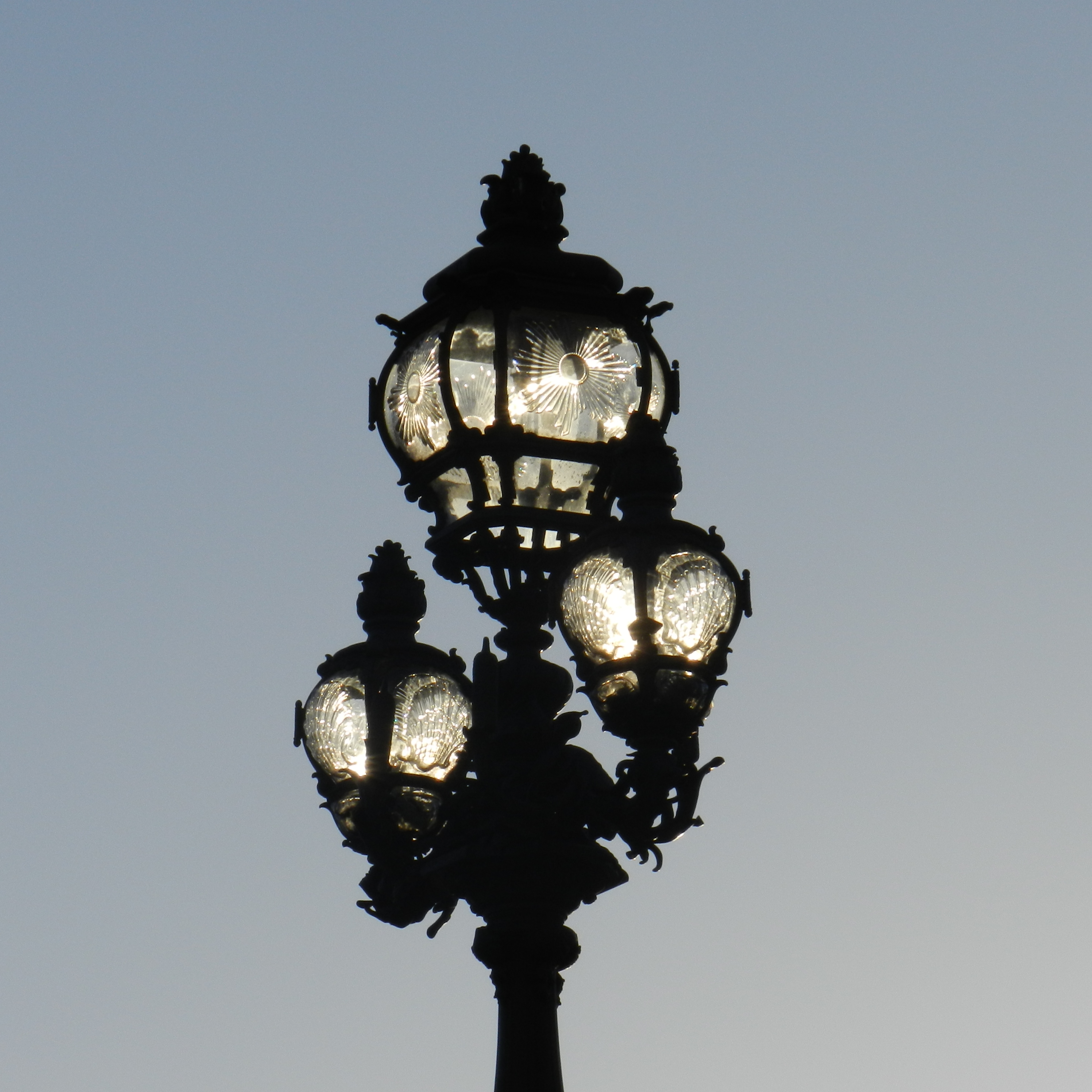
Various examples of street lights

A street light, light pole, lamp pole, lamppost, streetlamp, light standard, or lamp standard is a raised source of light on the edge of a road or path. Similar lights may be found on a railway platform. When urban electric power distribution became ubiquitous in developed countries in the 20th century, lights for urban streets followed, or sometimes led.

Many lamps have light-sensitive photocells or astro clocks that activate the lamp automatically when needed, at times when there is reduced ambient light compared to daytime, such as at dusk, dawn, or under exceptional cloud cover. This function in older lighting systems could be performed with the aid of a solar dial.

== History ==
=== Preindustrial era ===
Early lamps were used in the Ancient Greek and Ancient Roman civilizations, where light primarily served the purpose of security, to both protect the wanderer from tripping on the path over something and keep potential robbers at bay. At that time, oil lamps were used predominantly, as they provided a long-lasting and moderate flame. A slave responsible for lighting the oil lamps in front of Roman villas was called a lanternarius.

In the words of Edwin Heathcote, "Romans illuminated the streets with oil lamps, and cities from Baghdad to Cordoba were similarly lit when most of Europe was living in what it is now rather unfashionable to call the Dark Ages but which were, from the point of view of street lighting, exactly that."

So-called "link boys" escorted people from one place to another through the murky, winding streets of medieval towns.

Before incandescent lamps, candle lighting was employed in cities. The earliest lamps required that a lamplighter tour the town at dusk, lighting each of the lamps. According to some sources, illumination was ordered in London in 1417 by Sir Henry Barton, Mayor of London, though there is no firm evidence of this.

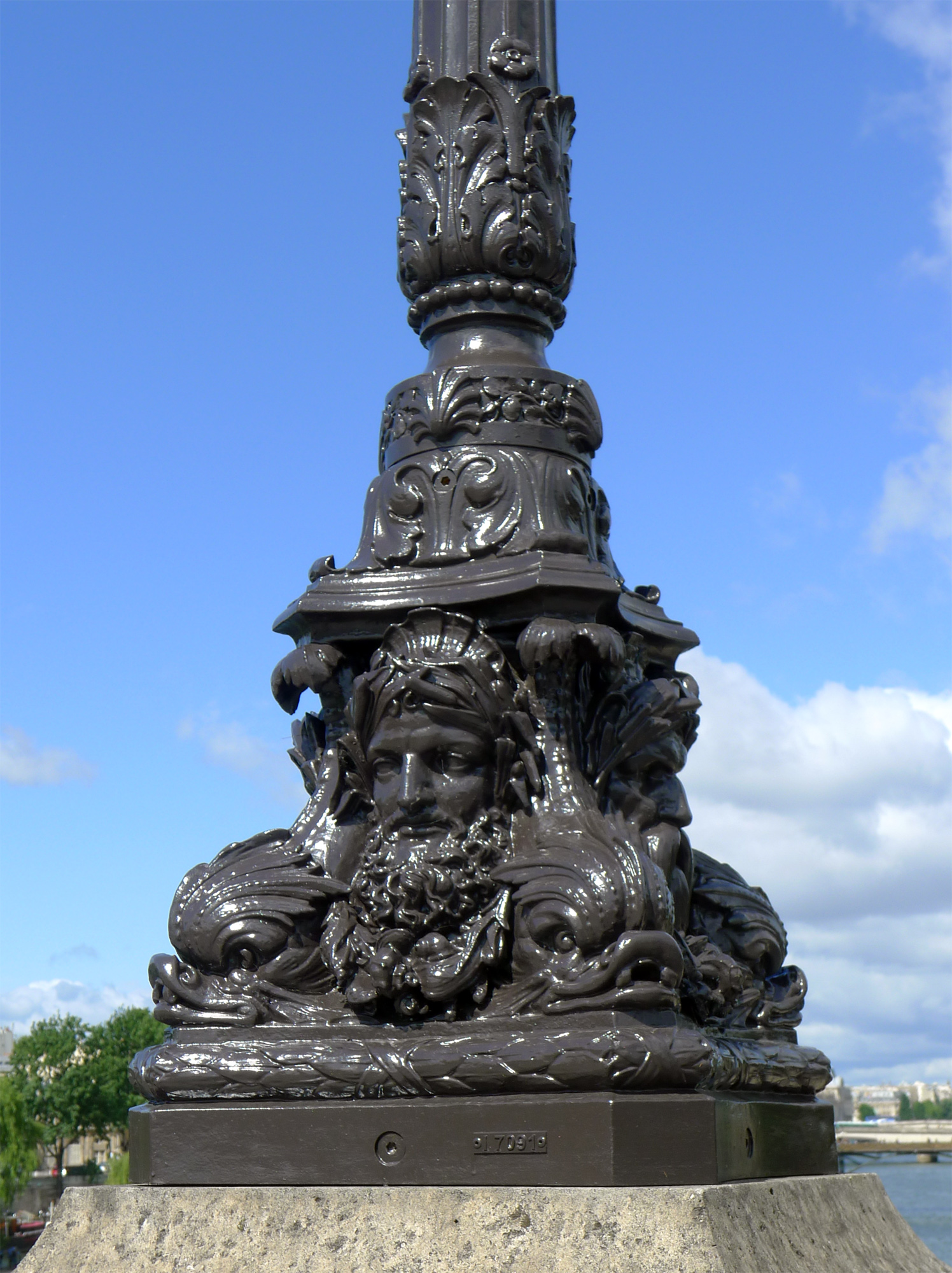
Detail of a street light base in Paris

Public street lighting was first developed in the 16th century, and accelerated following the invention of lanterns with glass windows by Edmund Heming in London and Jan van der Heyden in Amsterdam, which greatly improved the quantity of light. In 1588 the Parisian Parliament decreed that a torch be installed and lit at each intersection, and in 1594 the police changed this to lanterns. Still, in the mid 17th century it was a common practice for travellers to hire a lantern-bearer if they had to move at night through the dark, winding streets. King Louis XIV authorized sweeping reforms in Paris in 1667, which included the installation and maintenance of lights on streets and at intersections, as well as stiff penalties for vandalizing or stealing the fixtures. Paris had more than 2,700 streetlights by the end of the 17th century, and twice as many by 1730. Under this system, streets were lit with lanterns suspended 20 yards (18 m) apart on a cord over the middle of the street at a height of 20 feet (6.1 m); As an English visitor enthused in 1698, 'The streets are lit all winter and even during the full moon!' In London, public street lighting was implemented around the end of the 17th century; a diarist wrote in 1712 that 'All the way, quite through Hyde Park to the Queen's Palace at Kensington, lanterns were placed for illuminating the roads on dark nights.'

A much-improved oil lantern, called a réverbère, was introduced in 1745 and improved in subsequent years. The light shed from these réverbères was considerably brighter, enough that some people complained of glare. These lamps were attached to the tops of lampposts; by 1817, there were 4,694 lamps on the Paris streets. During the French Revolution (1789–1799), the revolutionaries found that the lampposts were a convenient place to hang aristocrats and other opponents.

=== Gas lamp lighting ===
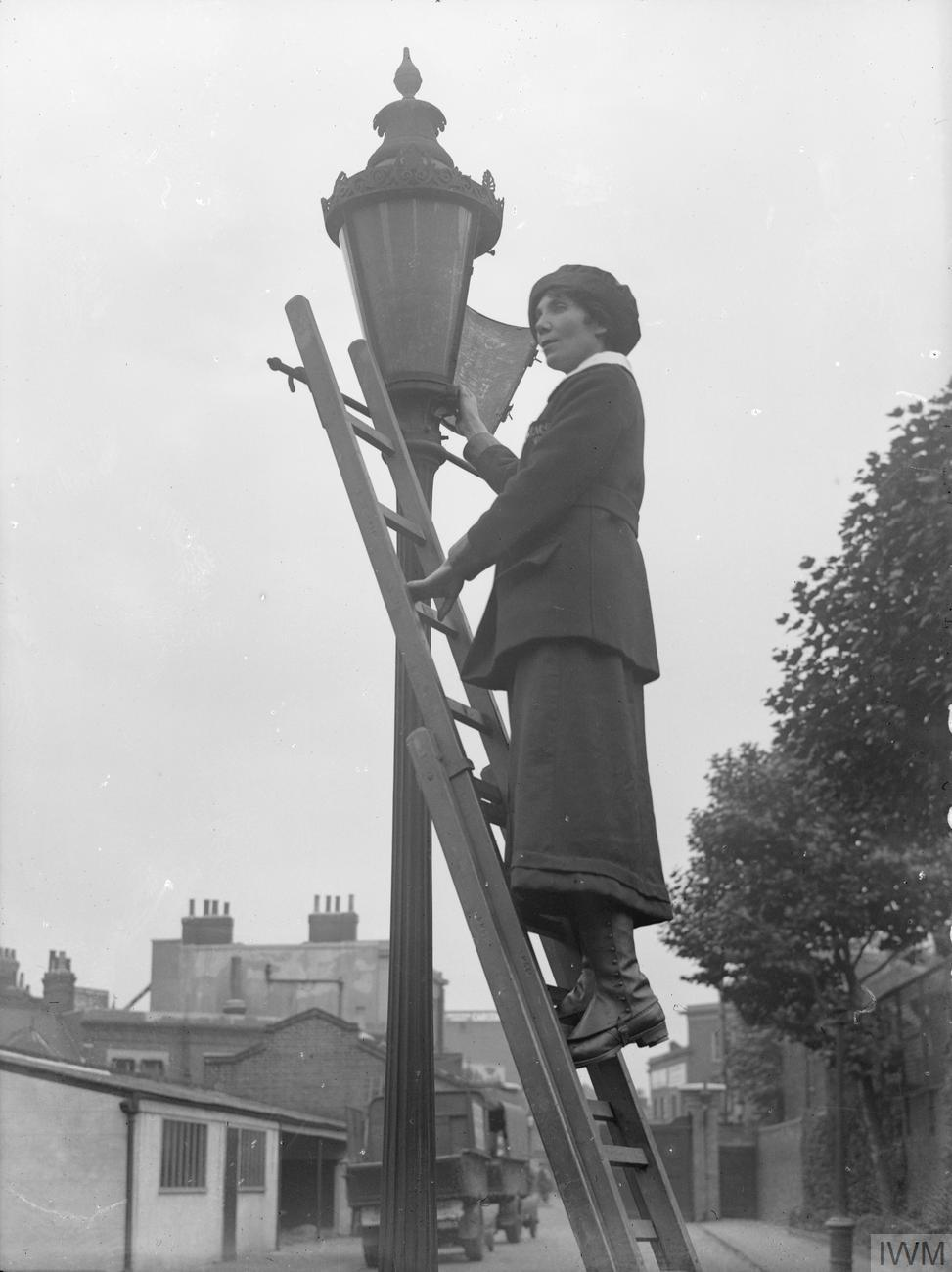
A lamplighter cleaning a lantern during the Great War

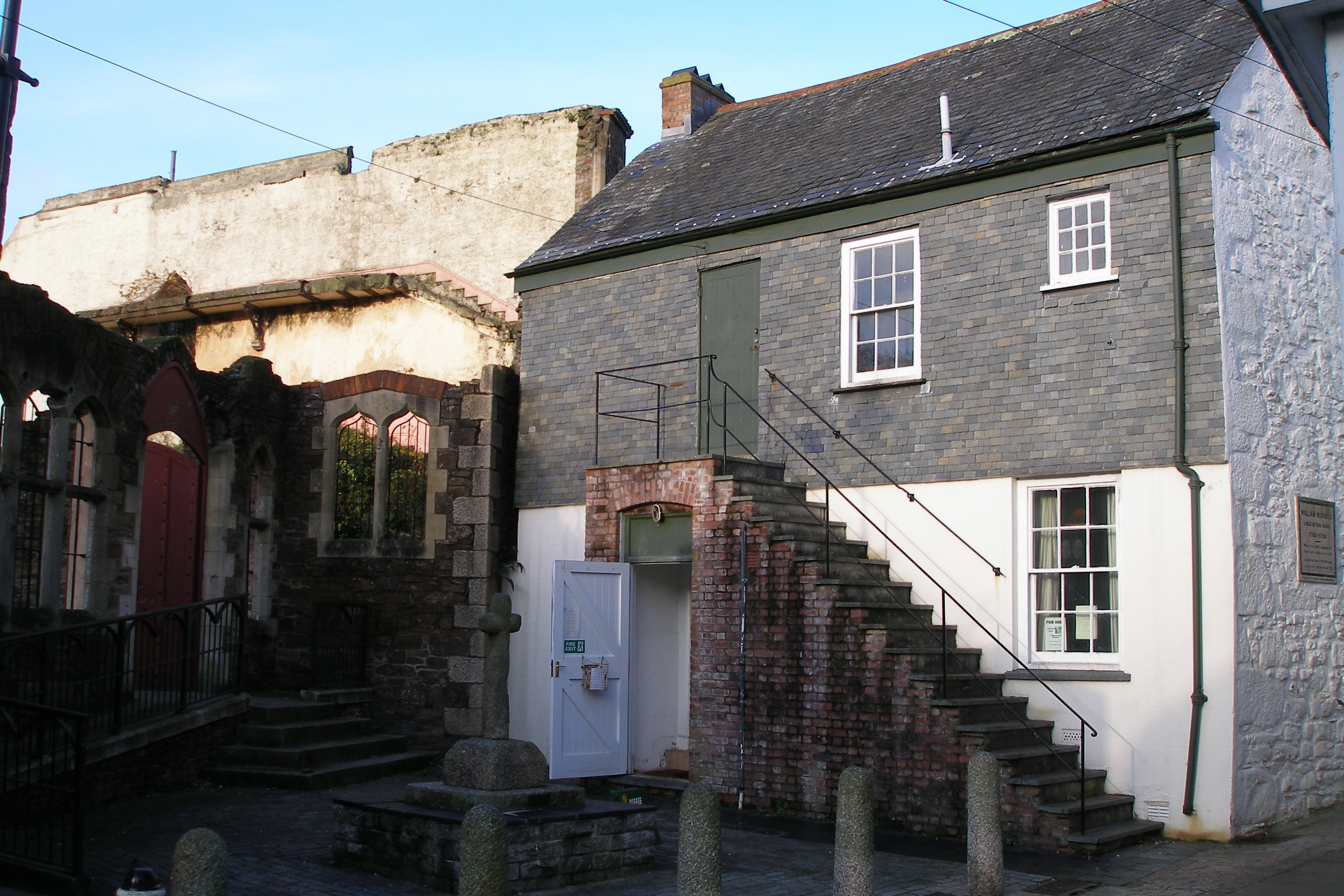
William Murdoch's house in Redruth, UK, the first domestic house in the world to be lit by gas

The first widespread system of street lighting used piped coal gas as fuel. Stephen Hales was the first person who procured a flammable fluid from the actual distillation of coal in 1726 and John Clayton, in 1735, called gas the "spirit" of coal and discovered its flammability by accident. William Murdoch (sometimes spelled "Murdock") was the first to use this gas for the practical application of lighting. In the early 1790s, while overseeing the use of his company's steam engines in tin mining in Cornwall, Murdoch began experimenting with various types of gas, finally settling on coal-gas as the most effective. He first lit his own house in Redruth, Cornwall in 1792. In 1798, he used gas to light the main building of the Soho Foundry and in 1802 lit the outside in a public display of gas lighting, the lights astonishing the local population.

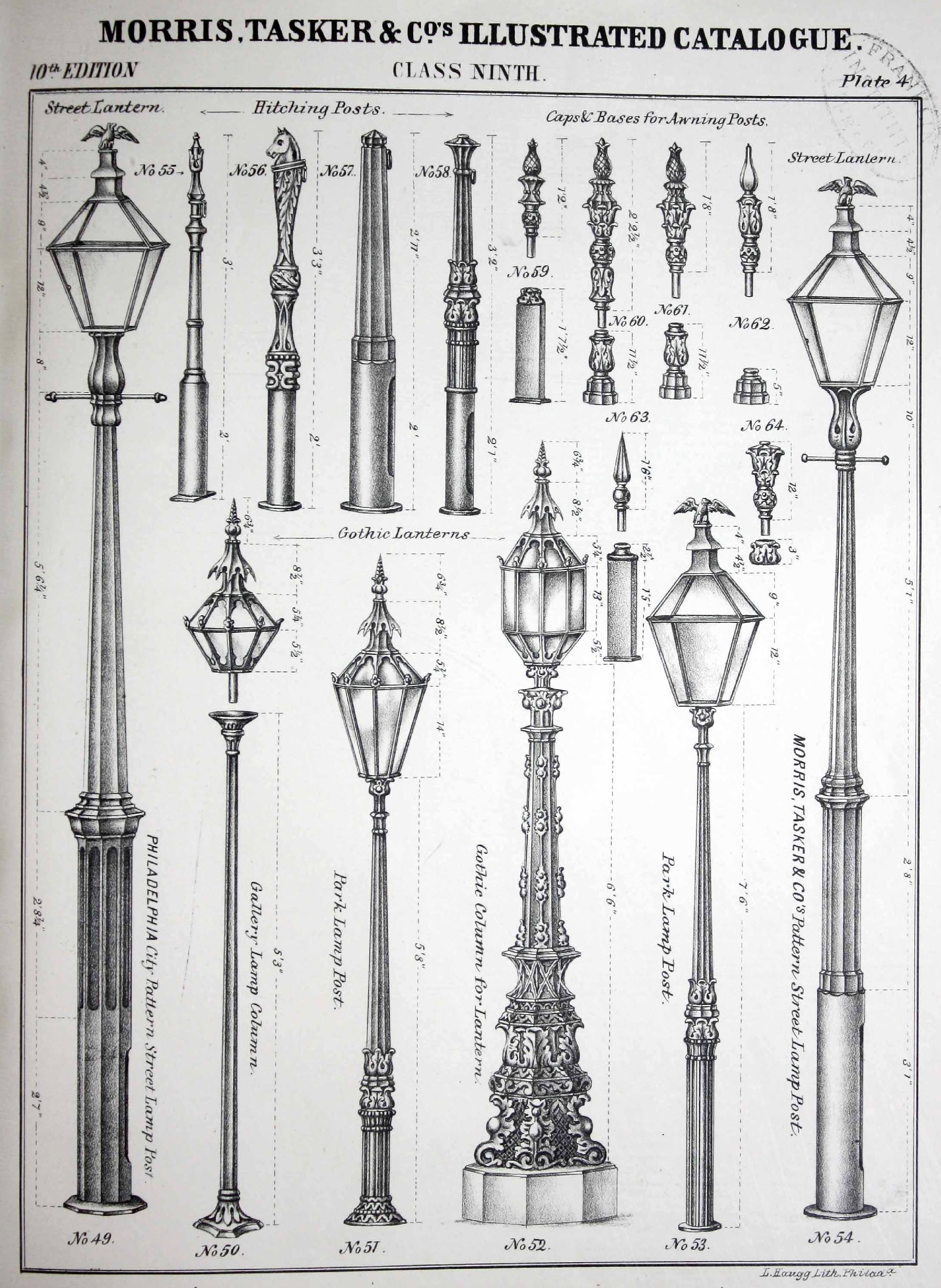
Streetlights from an 1871 catalog

The first public street lighting with gas was demonstrated in Pall Mall, London on 4 June 1807 by Frederick Albert Winsor.

In 1811, engineer Samuel Clegg designed and built what is now considered the oldest extant gasworks in the world. Gas was used to light the worsted mill in the village of Dolphinholme in North Lancashire. The remains of the works, including a chimney and gas plant, have been put on the National Heritage List for England. Clegg's installation saved the building's owners the cost of up to 1,500 candles every night. It also lit the mill owner's house and the streets of millworkers' houses in Dolphinholme.

In 1812, Parliament granted a charter to the London and Westminster Gas Light and Coke Company, and the first gas company in the world came into being. Less than two years later, on 31 December 1813, the Westminster Bridge was lit by gas.

Following this success, gas lighting spread outside London, both within Britain and abroad. The first place outside London in England to have gas lighting, was Preston, Lancashire in 1816, where Joseph Dunn's Preston Gaslight Company introduced a new, brighter gas lighting. Another early adopter was the city of Baltimore, where the gaslights were first demonstrated at Rembrandt Peale's Museum in 1816, and Peale's Gas Light Company of Baltimore provided the first gas streetlights in the United States. In the 1860s, streetlights were introduced in the Southern Hemisphere in New Zealand.

In Paris, public street lighting was first installed on a covered shopping street, the Passage des Panoramas, in 1817, private interior gas lighting having been previously demonstrated in a house on the rue Saint-Dominique seventeen years prior. The first gas lamps on the main streets of Paris appeared in January 1829 on the place du Carrousel and the Rue de Rivoli, then on the rue de la Paix, place Vendôme, and rue de Castiglione. By 1857, the Grands Boulevards were all lit with gas; a Parisian writer enthused in August 1857: "That which most enchants the Parisians is the new lighting by gas of the boulevards...From the church of the Madeleine all the way to rue Montmartre, these two rows of lamps, shining with a clarity white and pure, have a marvelous effect." The gaslights installed on the boulevards and city monuments in the 19th century gave the city the nickname "The City of Light."

Kerosene streetlamps were invented by Polish pharmacist Ignacy Łukasiewicz in the city of Lemberg (Austrian Empire), in 1853. His kerosene lamps were later widely used in Bucharest, Paris, and other European cities. He went on to open the world's first mine in 1854 and the world's first kerosene refinery in 1856 in Jasło, Poland.

Oil-gas appeared in the field as a rival to coal-gas. In 1815, John Taylor patented an apparatus for the decomposition of "oil" and other animal substances. Public attention was attracted to "oil-gas" by the display of the patent apparatus at Apothecary's Hall, by Taylor & Martineau.

During the period of gas lighting, lights were not generally left on for the entire night, nor were they necessarily turned on during periods of moonlight. In an article about the development of streetlighting in three industrial cities, Mark Bouman reported that Max Greve, the mayor of Bochum, Germany, "fought all his life against 'absurd modernism,' which would have had the lights on even when the moon shone."

==== Farola fernandina ====
Farola fernandina is a traditional design of gas streetlight which remains popular in Spain. Essentially, it is a neoclassical French style of gas lamp dating from the late 18th century. It may be either a wall-bracket or standard lamp. The standard base is cast metal with an escutcheon bearing two intertwined letters 'F', the Royal cypher of King Ferdinand VII of Spain and commemorates the date of the birth of his daughter, the Infanta Luisa Fernanda, Duchess of Montpensier.

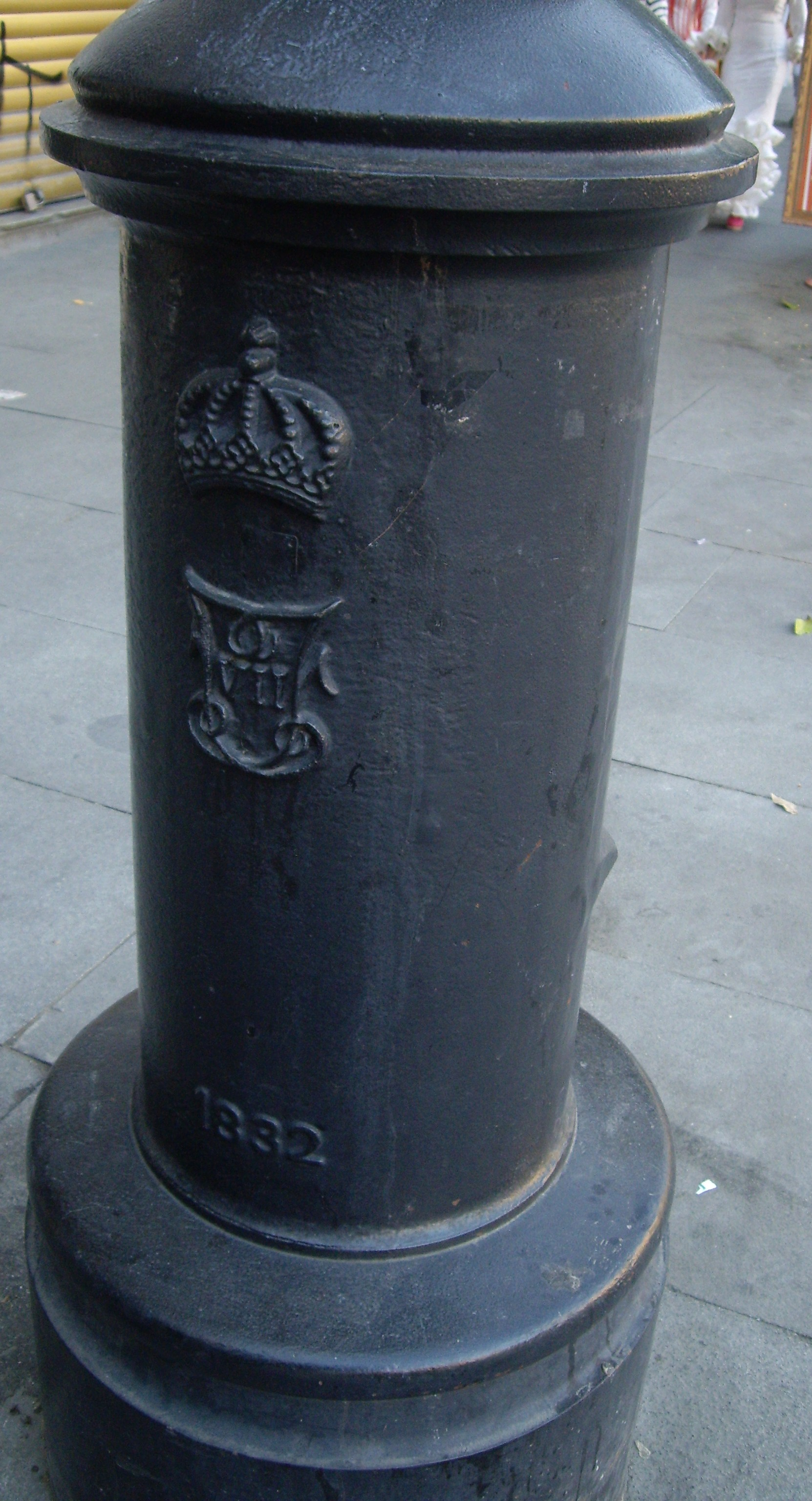
Typical base and escutcheon of a farola fernandina

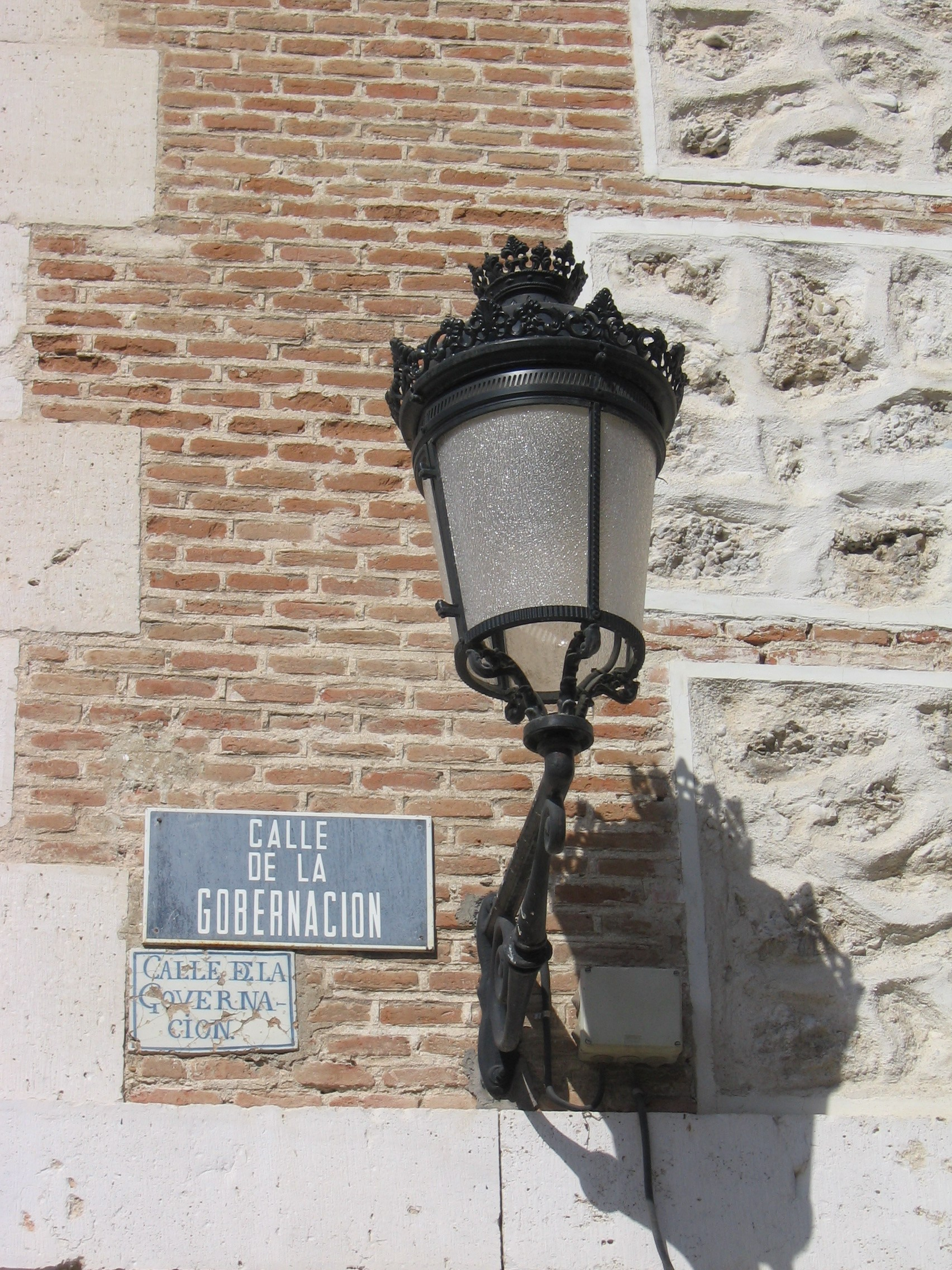
A farola fernandina in Aranjuez

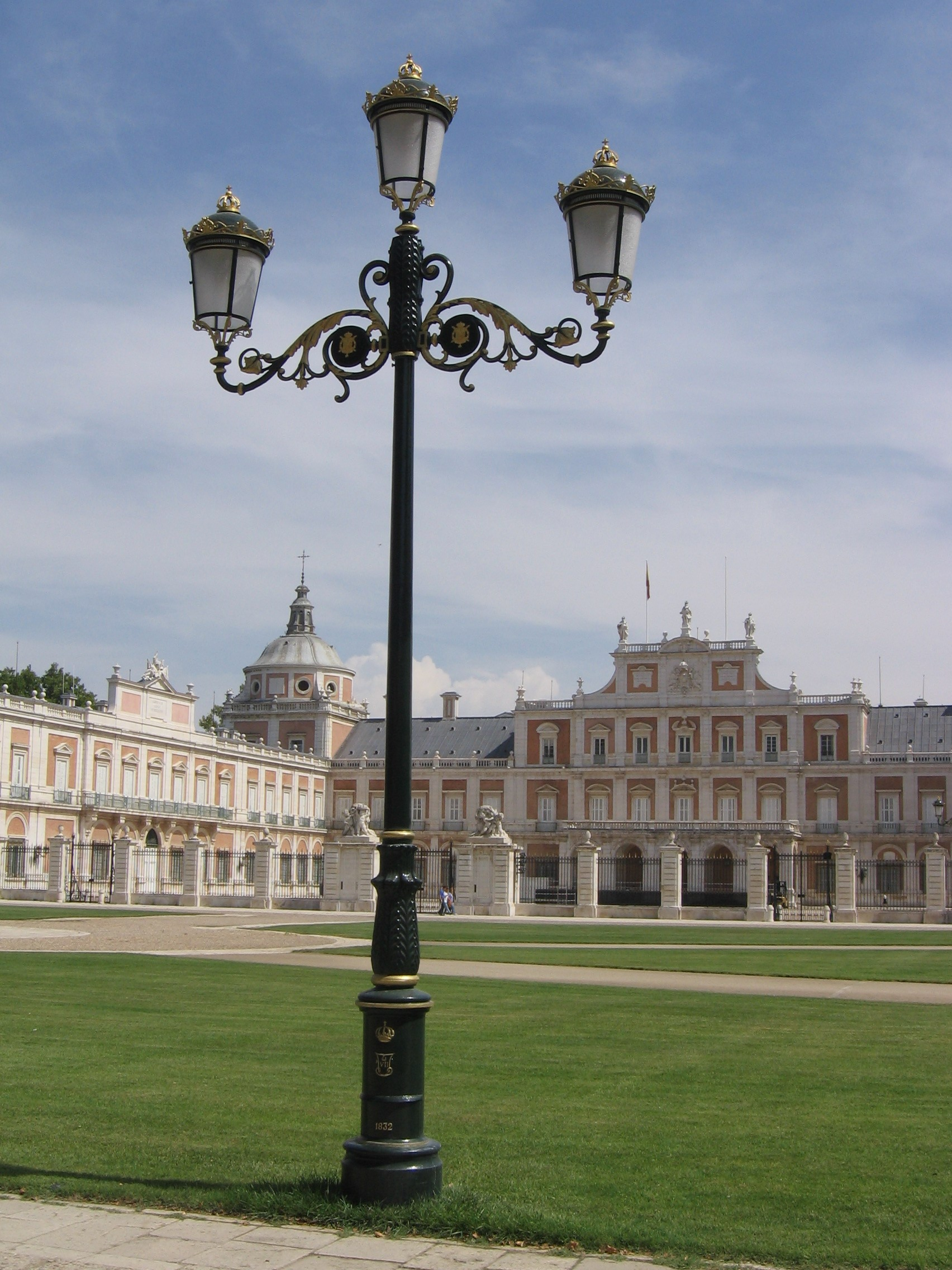
Streetlight in Ferdinand VII style near the Royal Palace of Aranjuez

=== Arc lamps ===
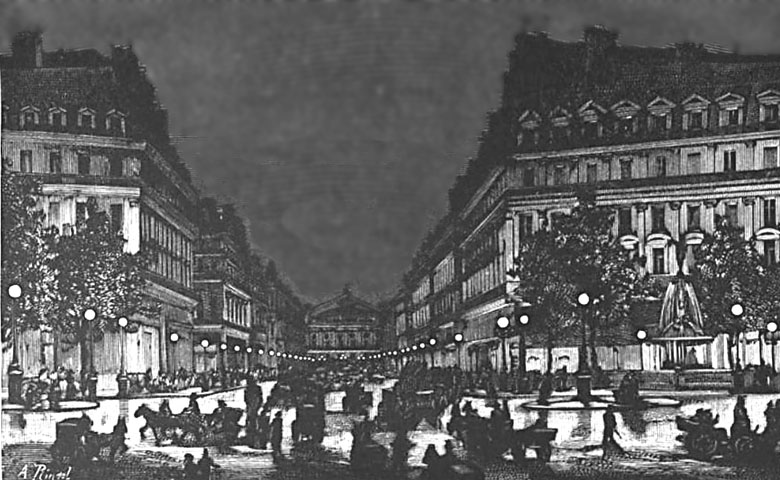
Demonstration of Yablochkov's arc lamp on the Avenue de l'Opera in Paris (1878), the first form of electric street lighting

The first electric street lighting employed arc lamps, initially the "electric candle", "Jablotchkoff candle", or "Yablochkov candle", developed by Russian Pavel Yablochkov in 1875. This was a carbon arc lamp employing alternating current, which ensured that both electrodes were consumed at equal rates. In 1876, the common council of the city of Los Angeles ordered four arc lights installed in various places in the fledgling town for street lighting.

On 30 May 1878, the first electric streetlights in Paris were installed on the avenue de l'Opera and the Place de l'Étoile, around the Arc de Triomphe, to celebrate the opening of the Paris Universal Exposition. In 1881, to coincide with the Paris International Exposition of Electricity, streetlights were installed on the major boulevards.

The first streets in London lit with the electrical arc lamp were by the Holborn Viaduct and the Thames Embankment in 1878. More than 4,000 were in use by 1881, though by then an improved differential arc lamp had been developed by Friedrich von Hefner-Alteneck of Siemens & Halske. The United States was quick in adopting arc lighting, and by 1890 over 130,000 were in operation in the US, commonly installed in exceptionally tall moonlight towers.

Arc lights had two major disadvantages. First, they emit an intense and harsh light which, although useful at industrial sites like dockyards, was discomforting in ordinary city streets. Second, they are maintenance-intensive, as carbon electrodes burn away swiftly. With the development of cheap, reliable and bright incandescent light bulbs at the end of the 19th century, arc lights passed out of use for street lighting, but remained in industrial use longer.

=== Incandescent lighting ===
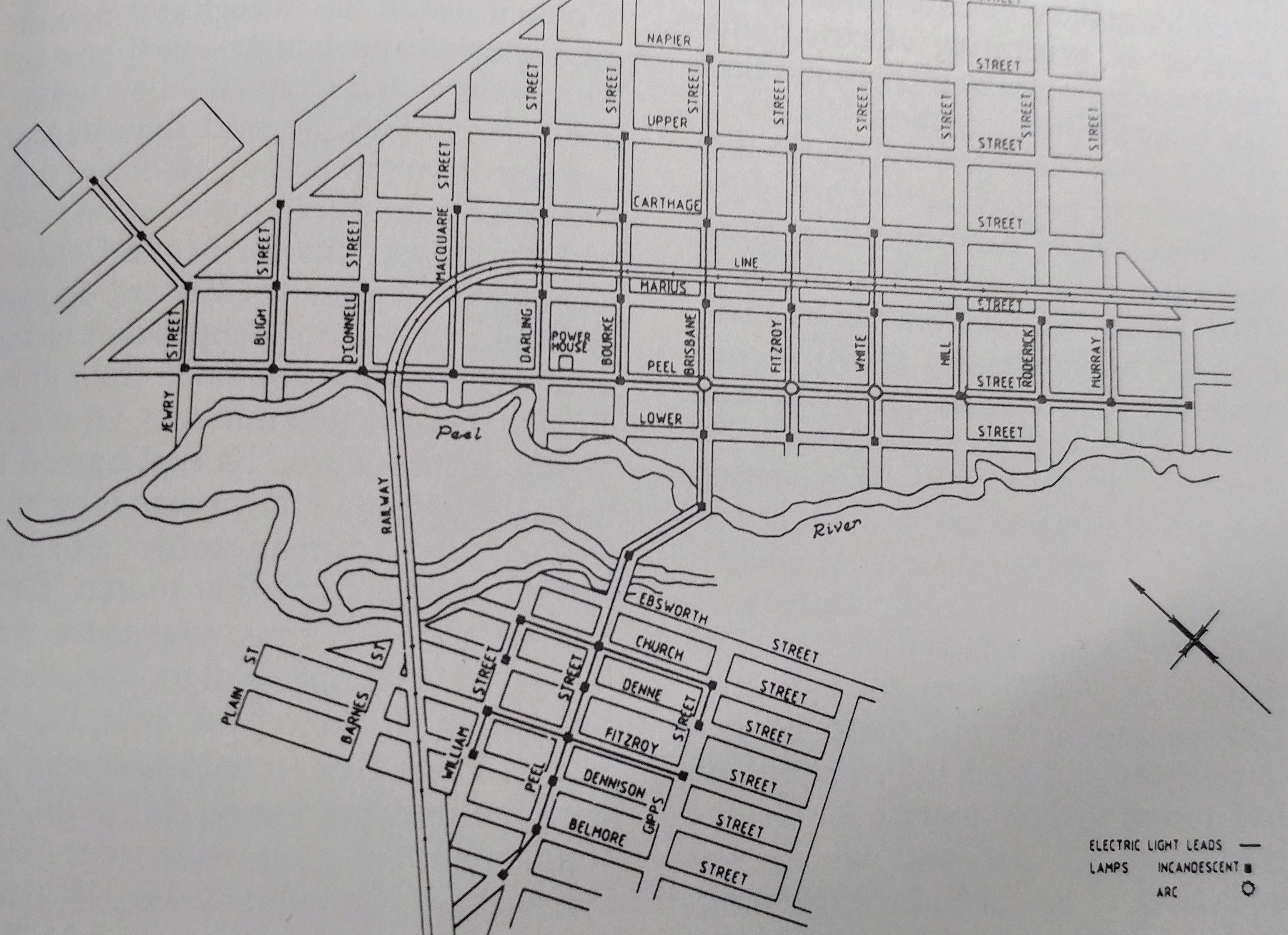
Map of Tamworth, New South Wales, showing the position of leads and lights along the network of city streets in 1888

The first street to be lit by an incandescent lightbulb was Mosley Street, in Newcastle. The street was lit for one night by Joseph Swan's incandescent lamp on 3 February 1879. Consequently, Newcastle has the first city street in the world to be lit by electric lighting. The first city in the United States to successfully demonstrate electric lighting was Cleveland, Ohio, with 12 electric lights around the Public Square road system on 29 April 1879. Wabash, Indiana, lit 4 Brush arc lamps with 3,000 candlepower each, suspended over their courthouse on 2 February 1880, making the town square "as light as midday".

Kimberley, Cape Colony (modern South Africa), was the first city in the Southern Hemisphere and in Africa to have electric streetlights – with 16 first lit on 2 September 1882. The system was only the second in the world, after that of Philadelphia, to be powered municipally.

In Central America, San Jose, Costa Rica, lit 25 lamps powered by a hydroelectric plant on 9 August 1884.

Nuremberg was the first city in Germany to have electric public lighting on 7 June 1882, followed by Berlin on 20 September 1882 (Potsdamer Platz only).

Timișoara (present-day Romania) was the first city in the Austro-Hungarian Empire to have electric public lighting, on 12 November 1884; 731 lamps were used.

On 9 December 1882, Brisbane, Queensland, Australia was introduced to electricity by having a demonstration of 8 arc lights, erected along Queen Street Mall. The power to supply these arc lights was taken from a 10 hp Crompton DC generator driven by a Robey steam engine in a small foundry in Adelaide Street and occupied by J. W. Sutton and Co. In 1884, Walhalla, Victoria, had two lamps installed on the main street by the Long Tunnel (Gold) Mining Company. In 1886, the isolated mining town of Waratah in Tasmania was the first to have an extensive system of electrically powered street lighting installed. In 1888, the New South Wales town of Tamworth installed a large system illuminating a significant portion of the city, with over 13 km of streets lit by 52 incandescent lights and 3 arc lights. Powered by a municipal power company, this system gave Tamworth the title of "First City of Light" in Australia.

On 10 December 1885, Härnösand became the first town in Sweden with electric street lighting, following the Gådeå power station being taken into use.

=== Later developments ===
Incandescent lamps were primarily used for street lighting until the advent of high-intensity gas-discharge lamps. They were often operated high-voltage series circuits. Series circuits were popular because it enabled controlling a large number of lamps from a single location and the constant current through the loop compensates for voltage drop along the wire resulting in consistent brightness from lamp to lamp. Additionally individual 6.6 Amp lamps operate at a lower voltage which results in more light per watt of electricity consumed. This is because a thicker shorter filament will have less surface area and lower thermal losses than a long thin filament.

To avoid having the entire system go dark if a single lamp burned out, each streetlamp was equipped with a device that ensured that the circuit would remain intact. Early series streetlights were equipped with isolation transformers. that would allow current to pass across the transformer whether the bulb worked or not.

Later, the film cutout was invented. This was a small disk of insulating film that separated two contacts connected to the two wires leading to the lamp. If the lamp failed (an open circuit), the current through the string became zero, causing the voltage of the circuit (thousands of volts) to be imposed across the insulating film, penetrating it (see Ohm's law). In this way, the failed lamp was bypassed and power was restored to the rest of the district. The streetlight circuit contained an automatic current regulator, preventing the current from increasing as lamps burned out, preserving the life of the remaining lamps. When the failed lamp was replaced, a new piece of film was installed, once again separating the contacts in the cutout. This system was recognizable by the large porcelain insulator separating the lamp and reflector from the mounting arm. This was necessary because the two contacts in the lamp's base may have operated at several thousand volts above ground.

== Modern lights ==
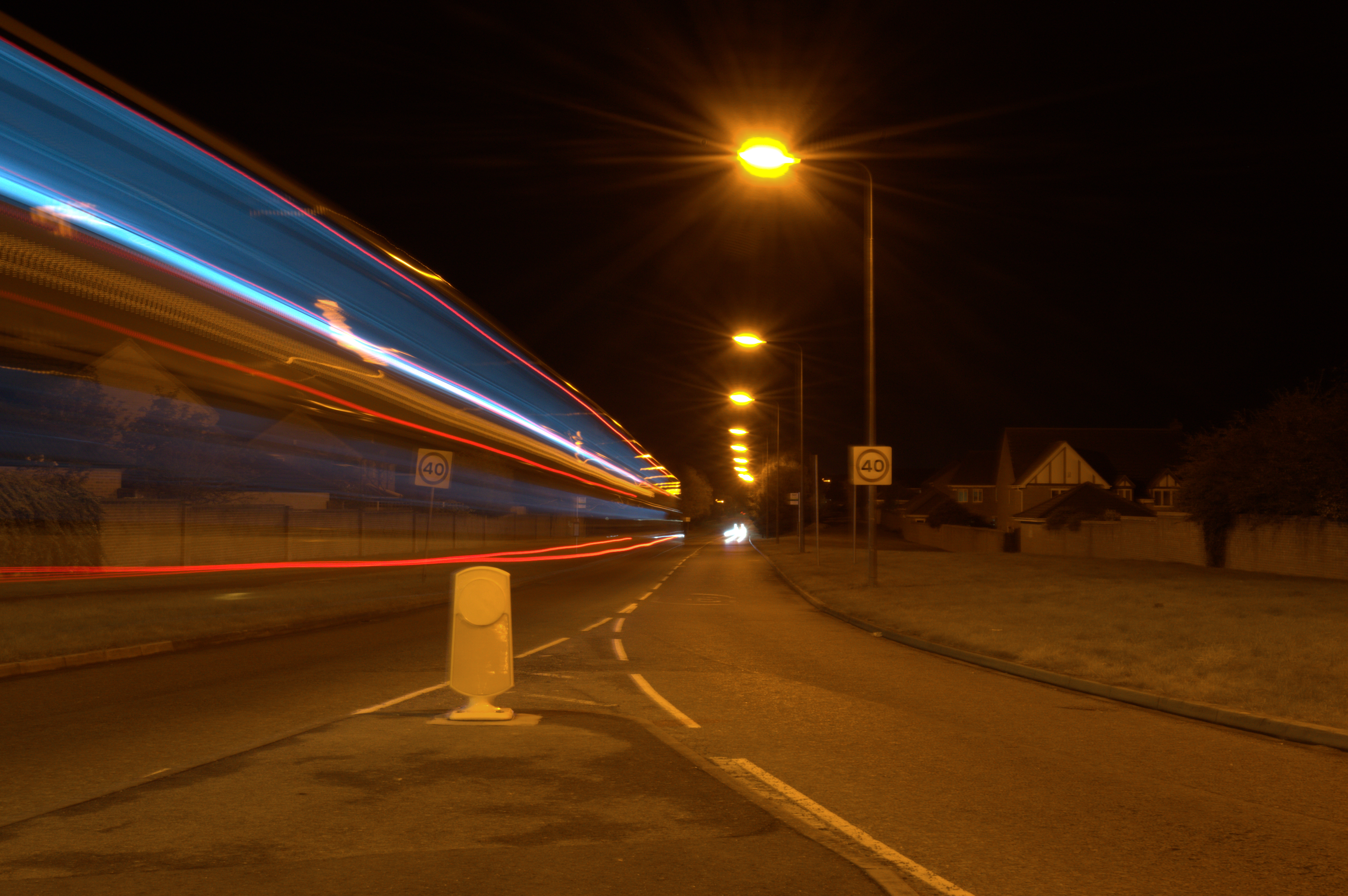
The distinctive monochromatic yellow glow from a low-pressure sodium lamp in the UK

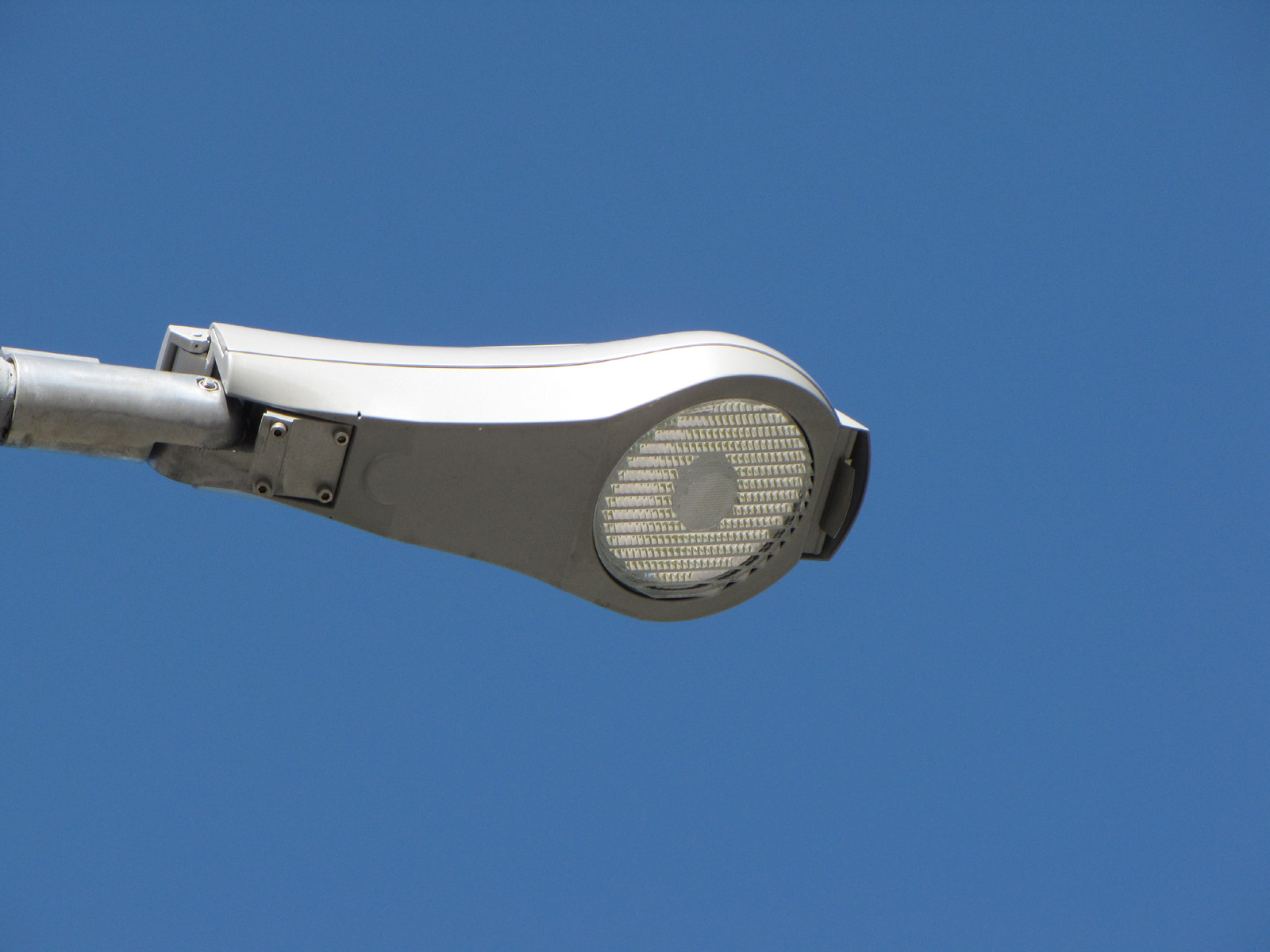
An LED street light

In the early 2000s, street lighting commonly used high-intensity discharge lamps. Low-pressure sodium (LPS) lamps became commonplace after World War II for their low power consumption and long life. Late in the 20th century, high-pressure sodium (HPS) lamps were preferred, taking further the same virtues. Such lamps provided the greatest amount of photopic illumination for the least consumption of electricity at the time.

Two national standards now allow for variation in illuminance when using lamps of different spectra. In Australia, HPS lamp performance needs to be reduced by a minimum value of 75%. In the UK, illuminances are reduced with higher values S/P ratio.

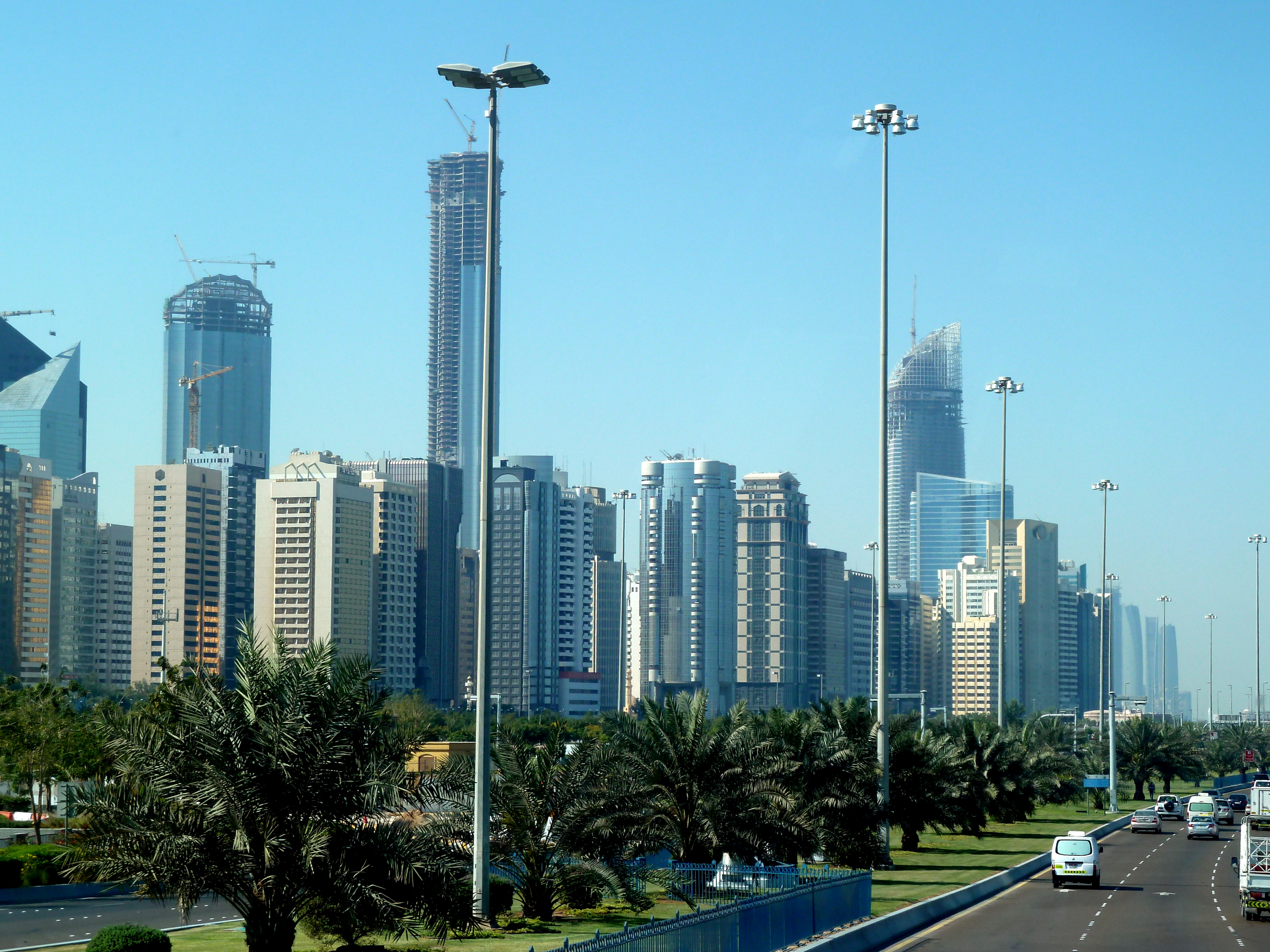
Street lights in Abu Dhabi, Middle East

Newer street lighting technologies, such as LED or induction lights, can be designed to emit a white light that provides high levels of scotopic lumens. It is a commonly accepted practice to justify and implement a lower luminance level for roadway lighting based on increased scotopic lumens provided by white light. However, this practice fails to provide the context needed to apply laboratory-based visual performance testing to the real world. Critical factors such as visual adaptation are left out of this practice of lowering luminance levels, leading to reduced visual performance. Additionally, there have been no formal specifications written around Photopic/Scotopic adjustments for different types of light sources, causing many municipalities and street departments to hold back on implementation of these new technologies until the standards are updated. Eastbourne in East Sussex, UK is currently undergoing a project to see 6000 of its streetlights converted to LED and will be closely followed by Hastings in early 2014. Many UK councils are undergoing mass-replacement schemes to LED, and though streetlights are being removed along many long stretches of UK motorways (as they are not needed and cause light pollution), LEDs are preferred in areas where lighting installations are necessary.

In North America, the city of Mississauga, Canada was one of the first and largest LED conversion projects, with over 46,000 lights converted to LED technology between 2012 and 2014. It is also one of the first cities in North America to use Smart City technology to control the lights. DimOnOff, a company based in Quebec City, was chosen as a Smart City partner for this project. In the United States, the city of Ann Arbor, Michigan was the first metropolitan area to fully implement LED street lighting in 2006. Since then, sodium-vapor lamps were slowly being replaced by LED lamps.

Photovoltaic-powered LED luminaires are gaining wider acceptance. Preliminary field tests show that some LED luminaires are energy-efficient and perform well in testing environments.

In 2007, the Civil Twilight Collective created a variant of the conventional LED streetlight, namely the Lunar-resonant streetlight. These lights increase or decrease the intensity of the streetlight according to the lunar light. This streetlight design thus reduces energy consumption as well as light pollution.

== Measurement ==
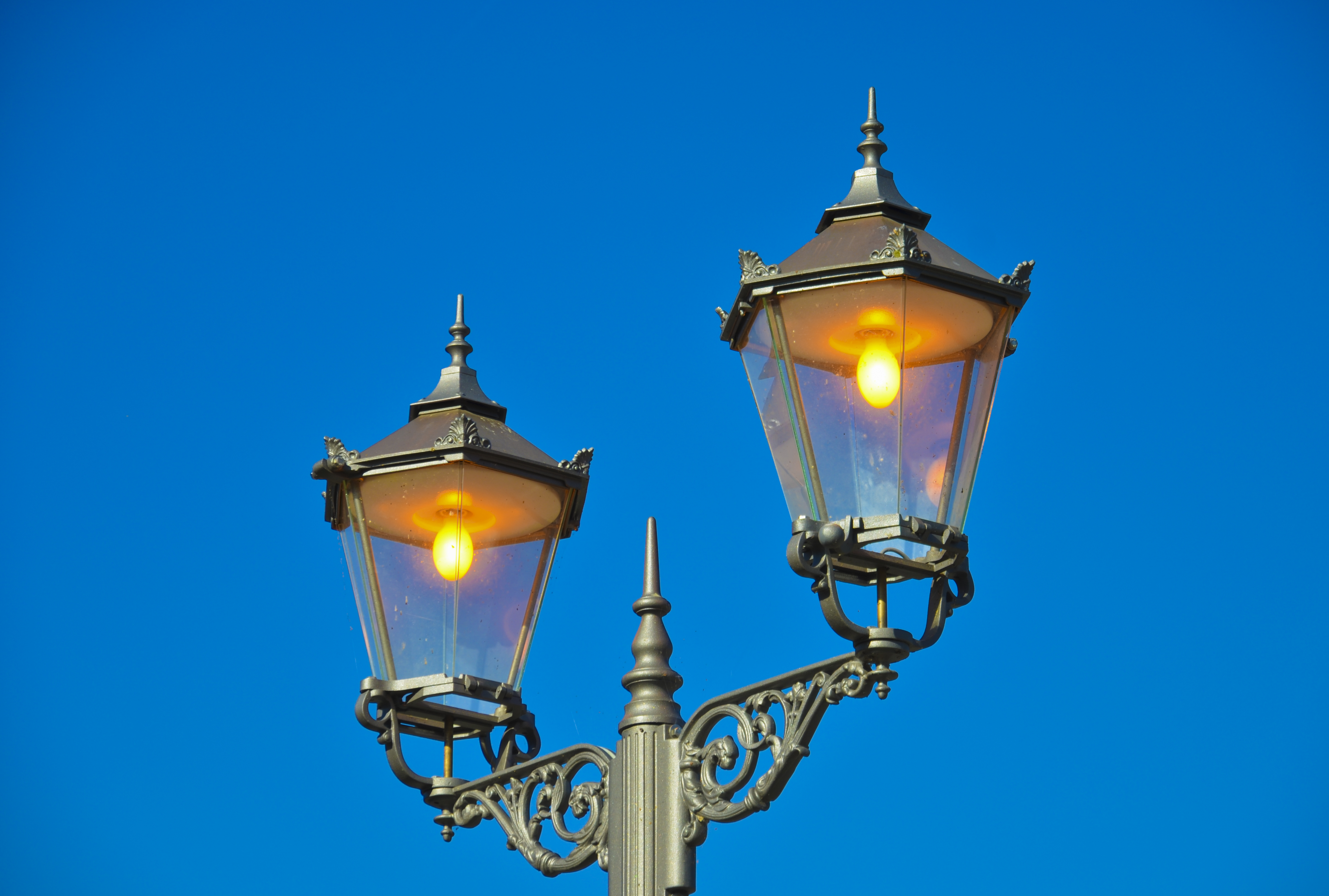
Old-style streetlight with lamps near the Mönchbruch hunting lodge near Rüsselsheim am Main, Germany

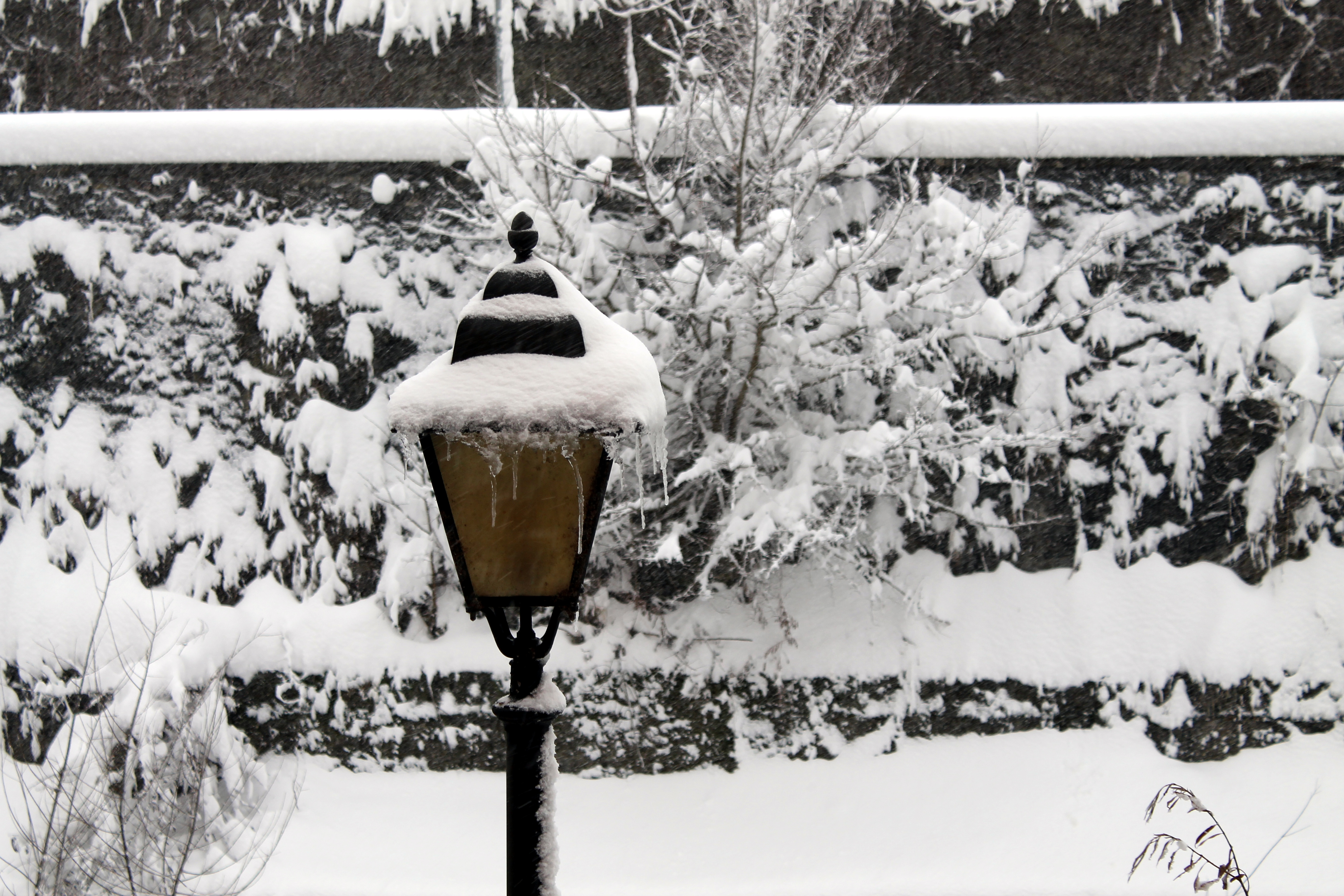
A streetlight during a snowfall

Two very similar measurement systems were created to bridge the scotopic and photopic luminous efficiency functions, creating a Unified System of Photometry. These mesopic visual performance models are conducted in laboratory conditions in which the viewer is not exposed to higher levels of luminance than the level being tested for. Further research is needed to bring additional factors into these models such as visual adaptation and the biological mechanics of rod cells before these models are able to accurately predict visual performance in real world conditions. The current understanding of visual adaptation and rod cell mechanics suggests that any benefits from rod-mediated scotopic vision are difficult, if not impossible, to achieve in real world conditions under the presence of high luminance light sources.

Outdoor Site-Lighting Performance (OSP) is a method for predicting and measuring three different aspects of light pollution: glow, trespass and glare. Using this method, lighting specifiers can quantify the performance of existing and planned lighting designs and applications to minimize excessive or obtrusive light leaving the boundaries of a property.

== Benefits ==
Street lighting generally makes wayfinding easier after dark, because of light that shines (whether intentionally or not) onto pedestrian areas. When properly designed, street lighting allows pedestrians to get around without carrying an illumination source such as a flashlight. In many places, street lighting has been used for so many years that it is now an expected public service. Perhaps as a result, people who have grown up in areas with street lighting sometimes report discomfort when street lights are not present or not turned on.

A frequently claimed advantages of street lighting is the prevention of automobile collisions and subsequent increase in safety. Studies have often shown that crashes and fatalities frequently occur at night, but night is also associated with other effects that are associated with collisions such as sleepiness and drunk driving. Despite the widespread presumption that streetlights increase safety, recent studies with large sample sizes have generally found little to no impact of lighting or changes of lighting (e.g. switch offs or dimming) on collisions. A study based on in-car roadway and driver cameras examining the moments leading up to over 2500 crashes found that driver error (e.g. improper turns) and behavior (e.g. reaching for something in the cabin) are the strongest contributors to crash frequency, and that improperly designed lighting may have in fact been a contributing factor to some of the crashes.

Another widely assumed benefit of street lighting is that it reduces crime. Claims for large crime reductions have been made in a number of studies, but many such studies have been criticized for inappropriate design. Well-conducted large-scale studies generally find little to no evidence that lighting or changes in lighting has an impact on nighttime crime rates. In a meta-analysis of studies examining the relationship between street lighting changes and crime, the studies that examined nighttime crime were consistent with no measurable effect (95% confidence interval 0.95-1.11).

Towns, cities, and villages can use the unique locations provided by lampposts to hang decorative or commemorative banners. Many communities in the US use lampposts as a tool for fundraising via lamppost banner sponsorship programs first designed by a US-based lamppost banner manufacturer.

== Disadvantages ==
The major criticisms of street lighting are that it can actually cause accidents if misused, and cause light pollution.

=== Health and safety ===
There are three optical phenomena that need to be recognized in streetlight installations.

- The loss of night vision because of the accommodation reflex of drivers' eyes is the greatest danger. As drivers emerge from an unlit area into a pool of light from a streetlight, their pupils quickly constrict to adjust to the brighter light, but as they leave the pool of light, the dilation of their pupils adjust to the dimmer light is much slower, so they are driving with impaired vision. Additionally, research has shown that pupil reflexes are more pronounced and post-light recovery takes longer after exposure to blue light compared to red light. This poses a continually increasing risk as blue-rich light sources become more common in roadway lighting and vehicle headlights. As a person gets older, the eye's recovery speed gets slower, so driving time and distance under impaired vision increases.
- The loss of night vision due to visual adaptation of retinal cells to a higher luminance level provided by streetlights. Once an individual leaves the illuminated area their retinal cells require adaptation time before they are sensitive to objects and motion under the lower luminance levels of unlit areas.
- Oncoming headlights are more visible against a black background than a grey one. The contrast creates greater awareness of the oncoming vehicle.
- Stray voltage is also a concern in many cities. Stray voltage can accidentally electrify lampposts and has the potential to injure or kill anyone who comes into contact with the post.

There are also physical dangers to the posts of streetlamps, other than children climbing them for recreational purposes. Streetlight stanchions (lampposts) pose a collision risk to motorists and pedestrians, particularly those affected by poor eyesight or under the influence of alcohol. This can be reduced by designing them to break away when hit (known as frangible, collapsible, or passively safe supports), protecting them by guardrails, or marking the lower portions to increase their visibility. High winds or accumulated metal fatigue also occasionally topple streetlights.

=== Light pollution ===
==== Astronomy ====
Light pollution can hide the stars and interfere with astronomy. In settings near astronomical telescopes and observatories, low-pressure sodium lamps may be used. These lamps are advantageous over other lamps such as mercury and metal halide lamps because low-pressure sodium lamps emit lower intensity, monochromatic light. Observatories can filter the sodium wavelength out of their observations and virtually eliminate the interference from nearby urban lighting. Full cutoff streetlights also reduce light pollution by reducing the amount of light that is directed at the sky, which also improves the luminous efficiency of the light, but reflected light from the ground can spill into the sky.

==== Ecosystems ====
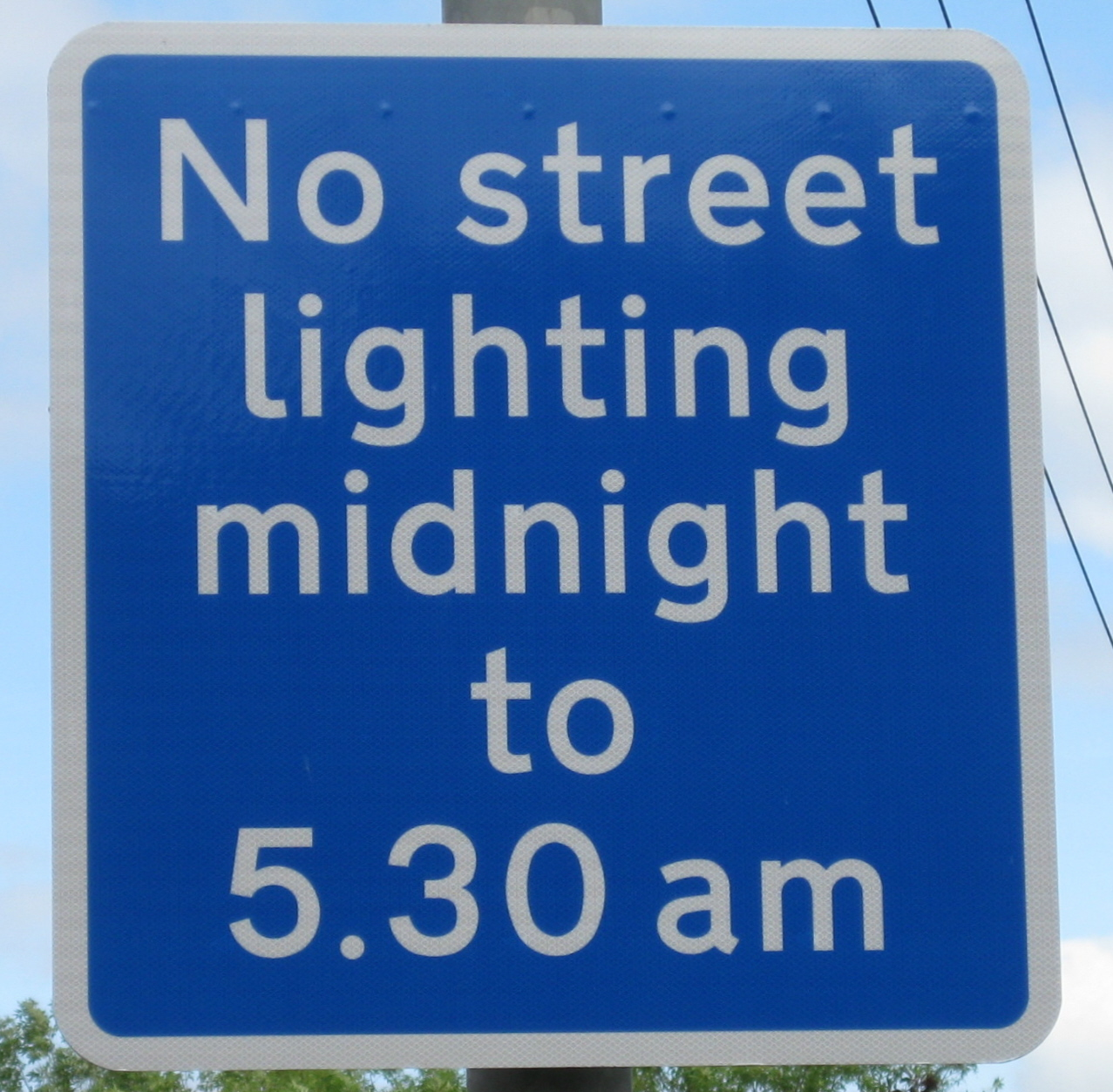
Sign in Leeds, UK, indicating part-night lighting, meant to save energy and reduce light pollution.

Streetlights can impact biodiversity and ecosystems—for instance, disrupting the migration of some nocturnally migrating bird species. In the Netherlands, Philips found that birds can get disoriented by the red wavelengths in street lighting, and in response developed alternative lighting that only emit in the green and blue wavelengths of the visible spectrum. The lamps were installed on Ameland in a small-scale test. If successful, the technology could be used on ships and offshore installations to avoid luring birds towards the open sea at night. Bats can be negatively impacted by streetlights, with evidence showing that red light can be least harmful. As a result, some areas have installed red LED streetlights to minimise disruption to bats. A study published in Science Advances reported that streetlights in southern England had detrimental impacts on local insect populations. Streetlights can also impact plant growth and the number of insects that depend on plants for food.

=== Energy consumption ===
As of 2017, globally 70% of all electricity was generated by burning fossil fuels, a source of air pollution and greenhouse gases, and also globally there are approximately 300 million streetlights using that electricity. Cities are exploring more efficient energy use, reducing streetlight power consumption by dimming lights during off-peak hours and switching to LED streetlights which illuminate a smaller area to a lower level of luminance. Many councils are using a part-night lighting scheme to turn off lighting at quieter times of night. This is typically midnight to 5:30 AM, as seen by the sign on the right. There have, however, been questions about the impact on crime rates. Typical collector road lighting in New York State costs $6,400/mile/year for high pressure sodium at 8.5 kW/mile or $4,000 for light-emitting diode luminaires at 5.4 kW/mile. Improvements can be made by optimising directionality and shape, however. Transitioning to wide angle lights enabled the doubling of distance between streetlights in Flanders from 45 m to 90 m, cutting annual street lighting electricity expenditures to €9 million for the 2,150 km long network that was retrofitted, corresponding to ca. €4,186/km.

== Street light control systems ==
A variety of control approaches are used to reduce energy use and improve maintenance of public lighting, ranging from simple astronomical time switches to networked lighting control (NLC) systems that allow remote monitoring, dimming, and fault detection. NLCs are commonly implemented over wireless or power-line communications and can integrate sensors (e.g., ambient light and occupancy) to adjust output based on pedestrian or vehicle activity.

Independent assessments report that adaptive and networked controls can provide additional savings beyond LED retrofits, while also enabling asset management and faster fault response; actual savings depend on duty cycle, dimming strategy, and sensor accuracy.

Regulations increasingly limit standby power in connected luminaires and controls (e.g., EU <0.5 W; California <0.2 W), which affects whole-system efficacy for "smart" installations.

=== Economics ===
Project economics depend on baseline technology, hours of use, electricity prices, incentives, and the chosen control strategy. Studies find that LEDs provide the largest share of savings, and that networked controls can deliver additional energy and maintenance benefits; cost-effectiveness varies by site and program design.

=== Image-based street light control ===
Research deployments have also evaluated image-based or multi-sensor "adaptive" control strategies that adjust light levels according to detected activity and speed on roadways and paths.

== Purpose ==
There are three distinct main uses of street lights, each requiring different types of lights and placement. Using the wrong types of lights can make the situation worse by compromising visibility or safety.

=== Beacon lights ===
A modest steady light at the intersection of two roads is an aid to navigation because it helps a driver see the location of a side road as they come closer to it, so that they can adjust their braking and know exactly where to turn if they intend to leave the main road or see vehicles or pedestrians. A beacon light's function is to say "here I am" and even a dim light provides enough contrast against the dark night to serve the purpose. To prevent the dangers caused by a car driving through a pool of light, a beacon light must never shine onto the main road, and not brightly onto the side road. In residential areas, this is usually the only appropriate lighting, and it has the bonus side effect of providing spill lighting onto any sidewalk there for the benefit of pedestrians. On Interstate highways, this purpose is commonly served by placing reflectors at the sides of the road.

=== Roadway lights ===
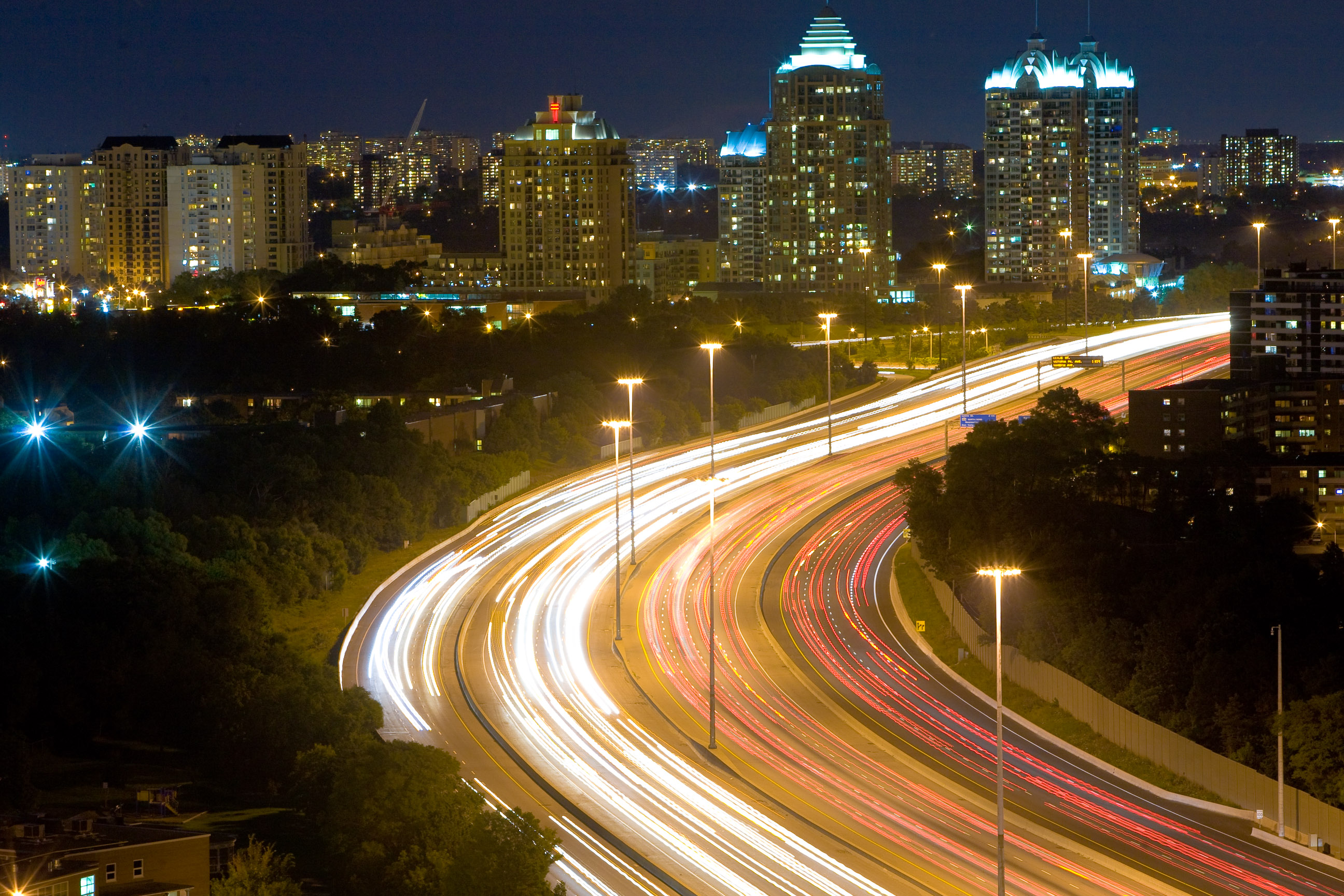
High-mast lighting along Highway 401 in Ontario, Canada

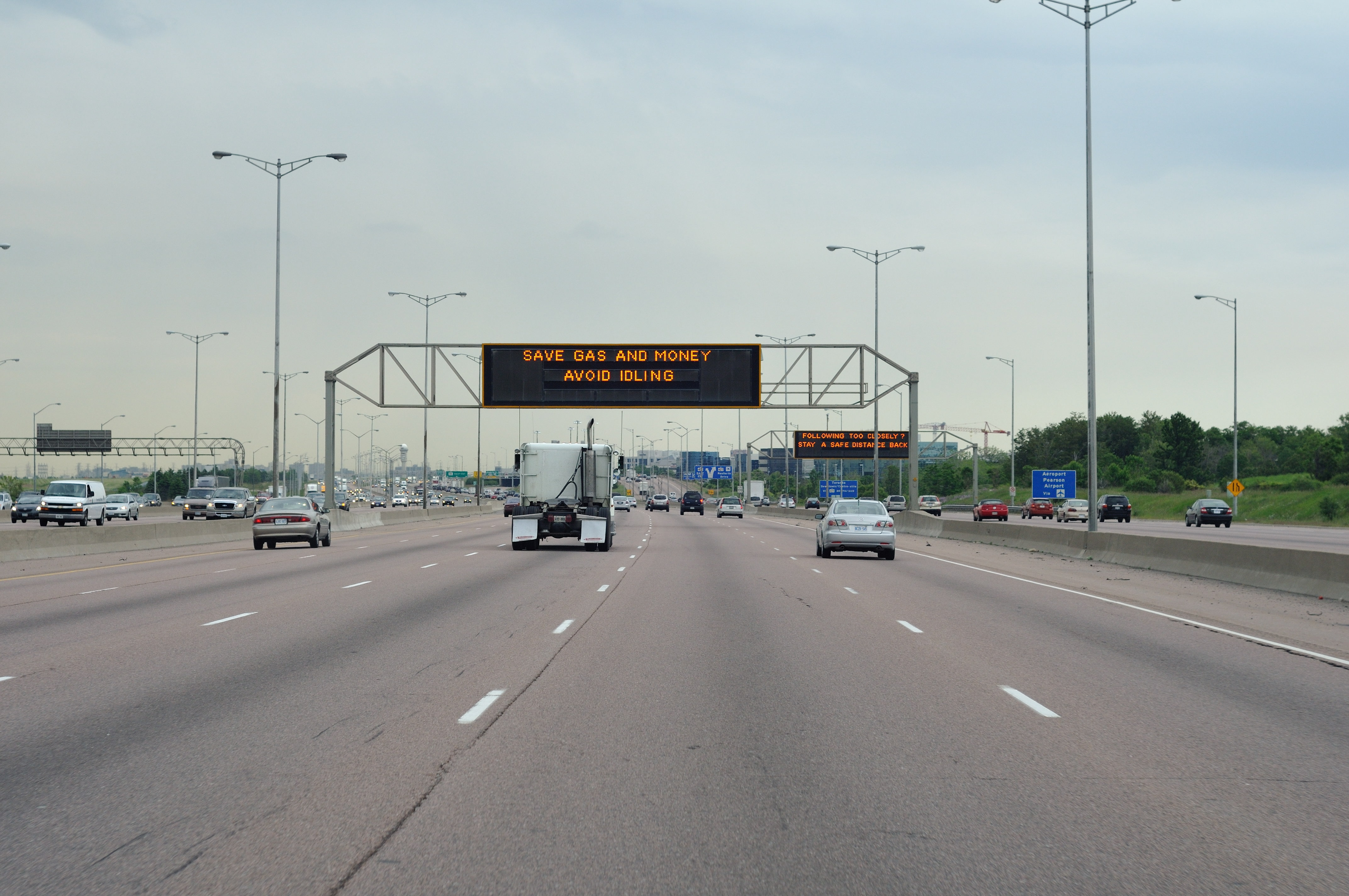
Conventional streetlights are used instead of high-mast lighting near airport runway approaches due to the negative effects caused by the latter.

Because of the dangers discussed above, roadway lights are properly used sparingly and only when a particular situation justifies increasing the risk. This usually involves an intersection with several turning movements and much signage, situations where drivers must take in much information quickly that is not in the headlights' beam. In these situations (a freeway junction or exit ramp), the intersection may be lit so that drivers can quickly see all hazards, and a well-designed plan will have gradually increasing lighting for approximately a quarter of a minute before the intersection and gradually decreasing lighting after it. The main stretches of highways remain unlighted to preserve the driver's night vision and increase the visibility of oncoming headlights. If there is a sharp curve where headlights will not illuminate the road, a light on the outside of the curve is often justified.

If it is desired to light a roadway (perhaps due to heavy and fast multi-lane traffic), to avoid the dangers of casual placement of street lights, it should not be lit intermittently since this requires repeated eye readjustment, which causes eyestrain and temporary blindness when entering and leaving light pools. In this case, the system is designed to eliminate the need for headlights. This is usually achieved with bright lights placed on high poles at close, regular intervals so that there is consistent light along the route. The lighting goes from curb to curb.

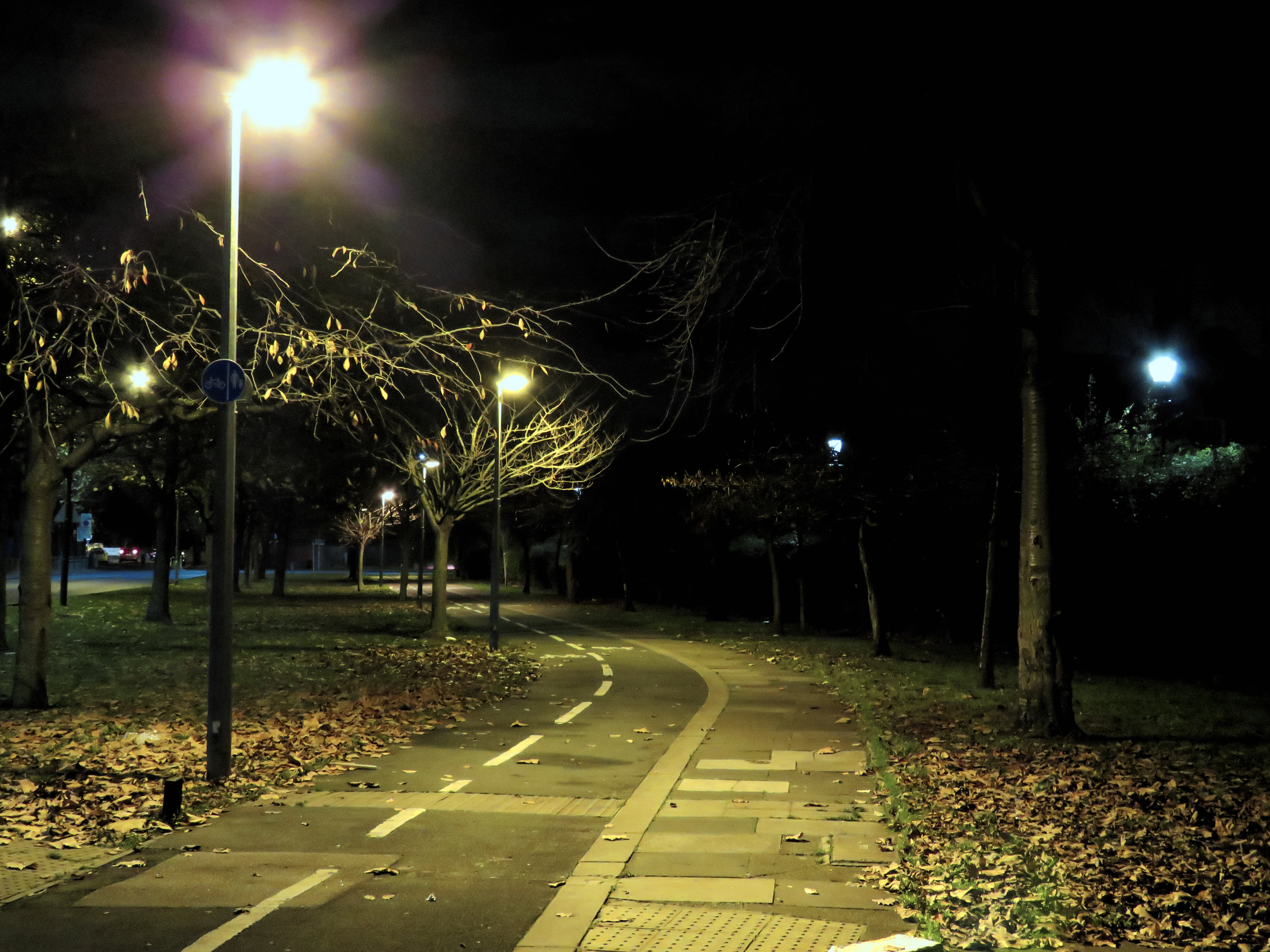
Safe cycling with a dedicated bicycle path with street lights in London

=== Cycle path lights ===
Policies that encourage utility cycling have been proposed and implemented, including lighting bike paths to increase safety at night.

== Usage on rail transport ==
Lights similar to street lights are used on railway platforms at train stations in the open air. Their purpose is similar to that of beacon lights: they help a train driver see the location of a station at night as the train comes closer to it, so that the driver can adjust the braking and know exactly where to stop. A train station light must never shine directly onto the tracks, and has the bonus side effect of providing spill lighting onto any platform for the benefit of passengers waiting there.

== Maintenance ==
Street lighting systems require ongoing maintenance, which can be classified as either reactive or preventative. Reactive maintenance is a direct response to a lighting failure, such as replacing a discharge lamp after it has failed or replacing an entire lighting unit after it has been hit by a vehicle. Preventative maintenance is the scheduled replacement of lighting components, for example, replacing all the discharge lamps in an area of the city when they have reached 85% of their expected life. Maintenance may be undertaken by the lighting owners or by a contractor.

In the United Kingdom, the Roads Liaison Group has issued a Code of Practice recommending specific reactive and preventative maintenance procedures.

Some street lights in New York City have an orange or red light on top of the luminaire (light fixture) or a red light attached to the lamppost. This indicates that near to this lighting pole or in the same intersection, there is a fire alarm pull box. Other street lights have a small red light next to the street light bulb; when the small light flashes, it indicates an issue with the electric current.

== Street lights as public goods ==
In economics, street lighting is commonly cited as a classic example of a (near-)public good: benefits are non-rival and typically non-excludable, so provision is usually coordinated by government and funded collectively.

== Main manufacturers ==
Australia

- Osram Sylvania
- Westinghouse

North America

- American Electric Lighting (formerly ITT, later Thomas & Betts), US
- Cooper Lighting division of Cooper Industries, US
- General Electric, US
- Osram Sylvania, US
- Westinghouse Lighting Corporation (formerly Angelo Brothers) division of the new Westinghouse Electric, US

Europe

- CU Phosco Lighting, United Kingdom
- Trilux, Germany
- Osram, Germany
- Philips, the Netherlands
- Siemens, Germany
- Svetlina AD, Bulgaria
- Thorn Lighting, United Kingdom
- Schréder, Belgium
- DE NOOD, the Netherlands

Asia

- Matsushita Electric Industrial Co., Japan
- Sanyo, Japan
- Bajaj Electricals, India

== Gallery ==
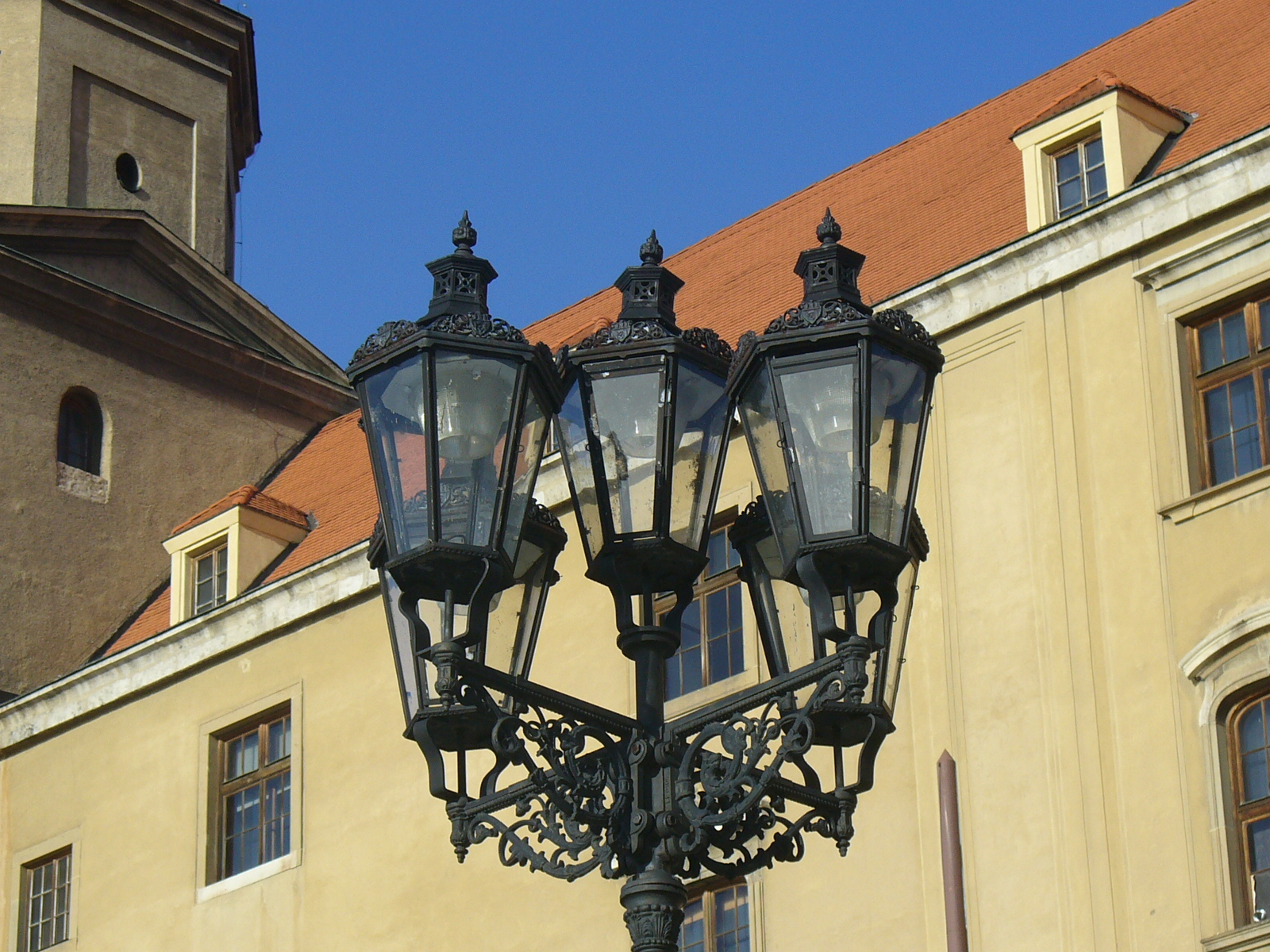
A historical Slovak lamppost

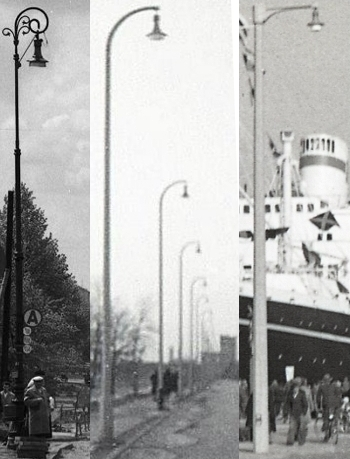
Polish street lights from the 1930s

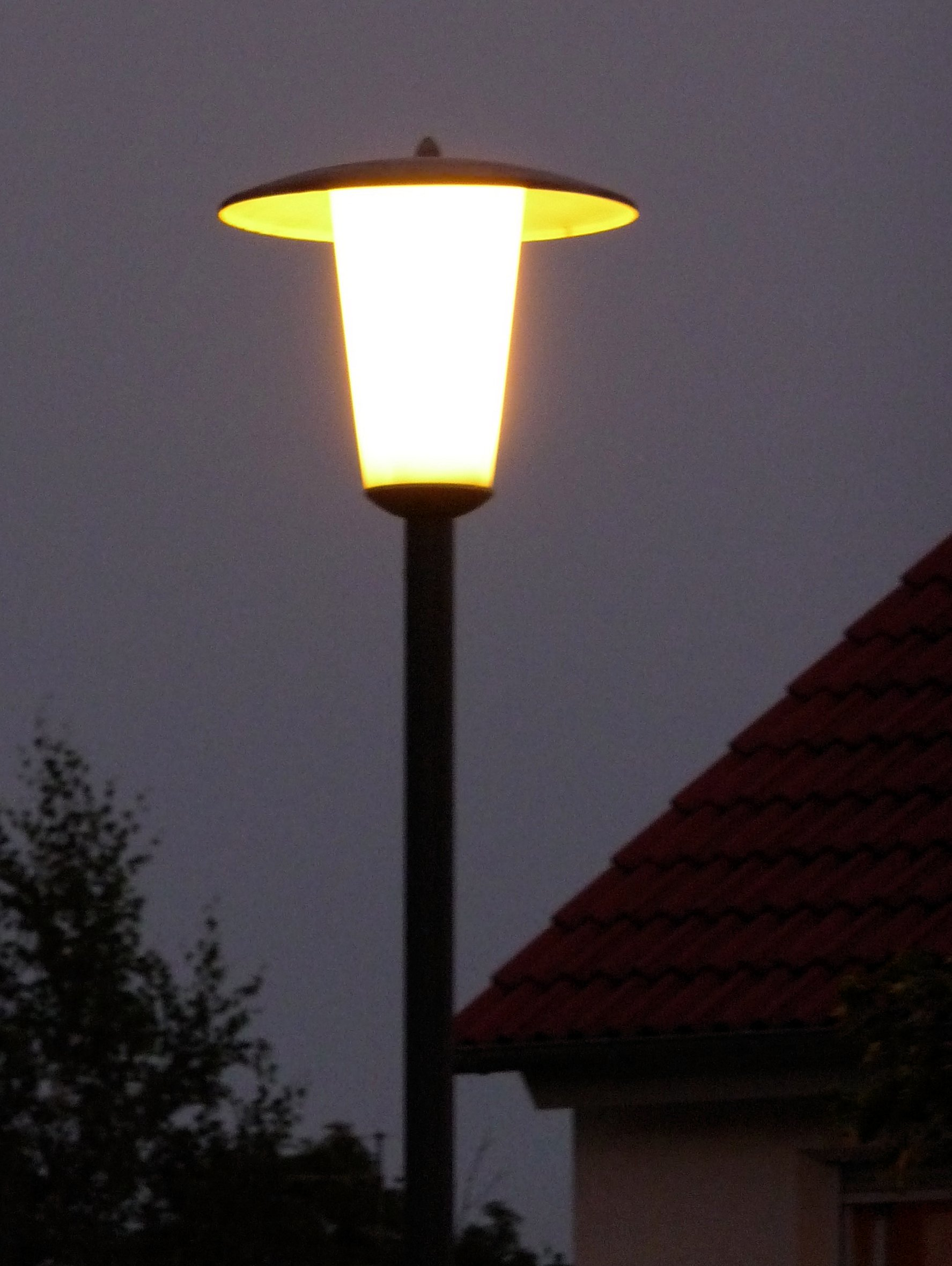
German streetlight at night

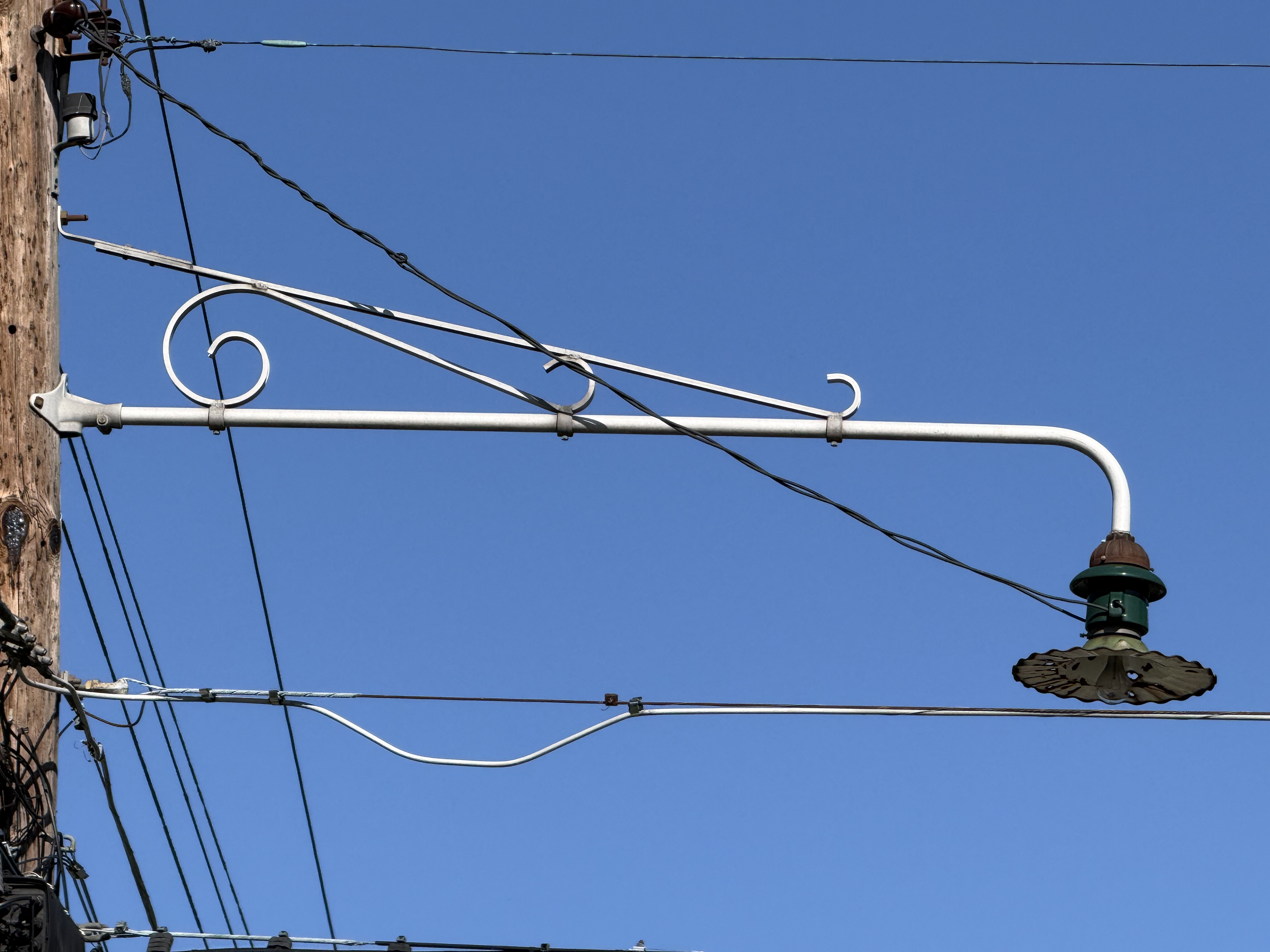
Street light from the 1950s attached to a utility pole in New Jersey

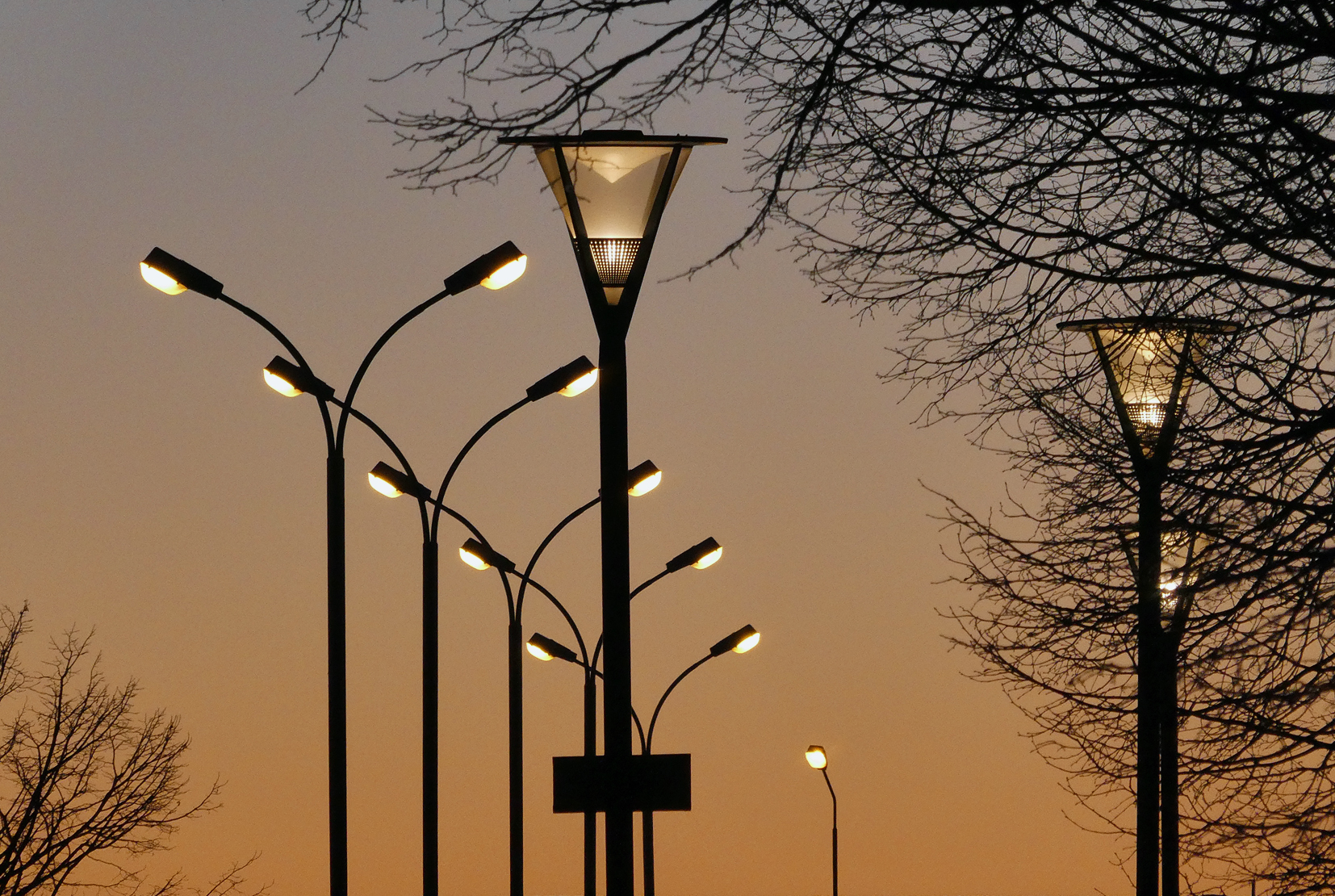
Streetlights in Ystad, 2021

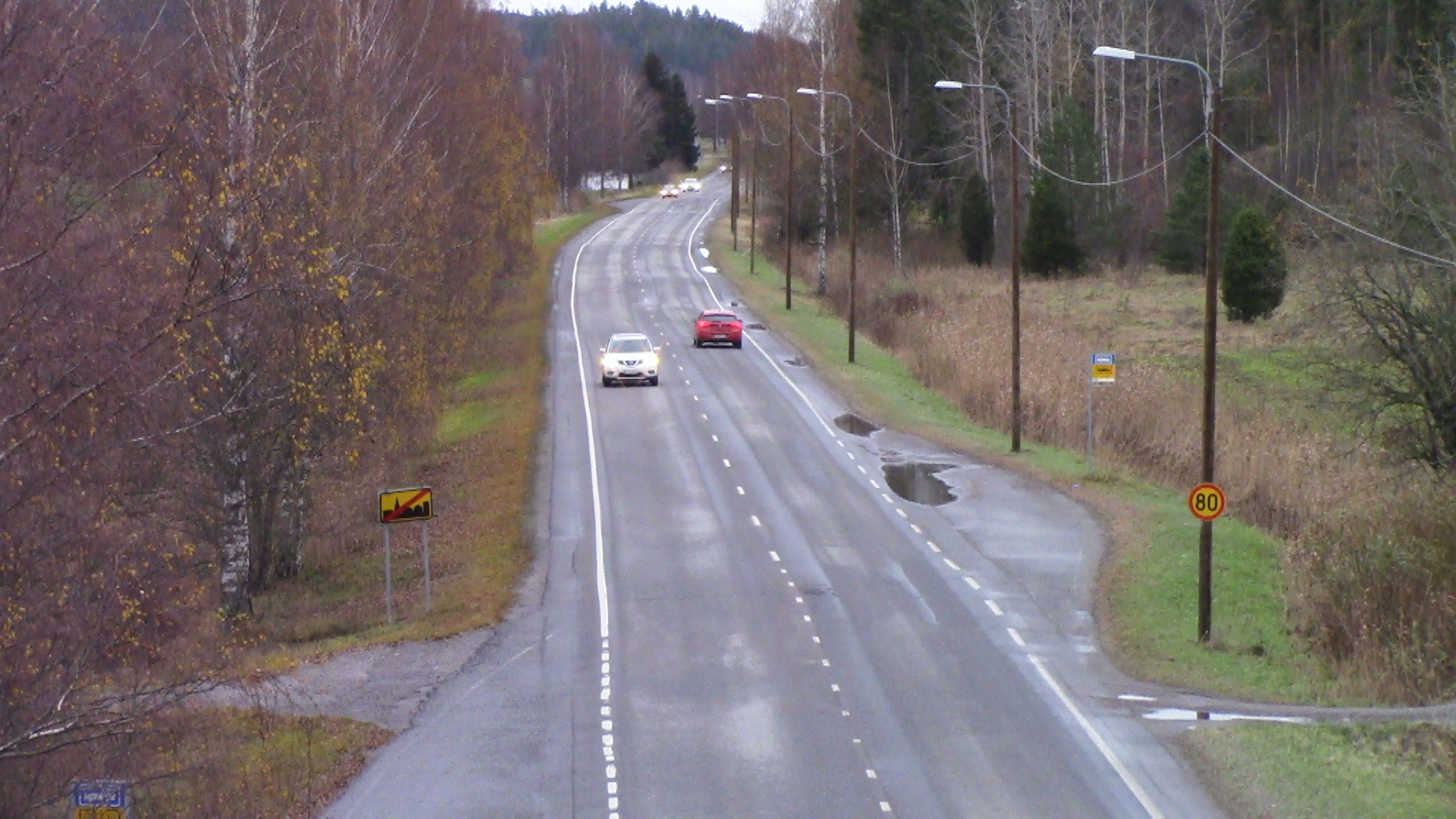
Streetlights in Finnish regional road

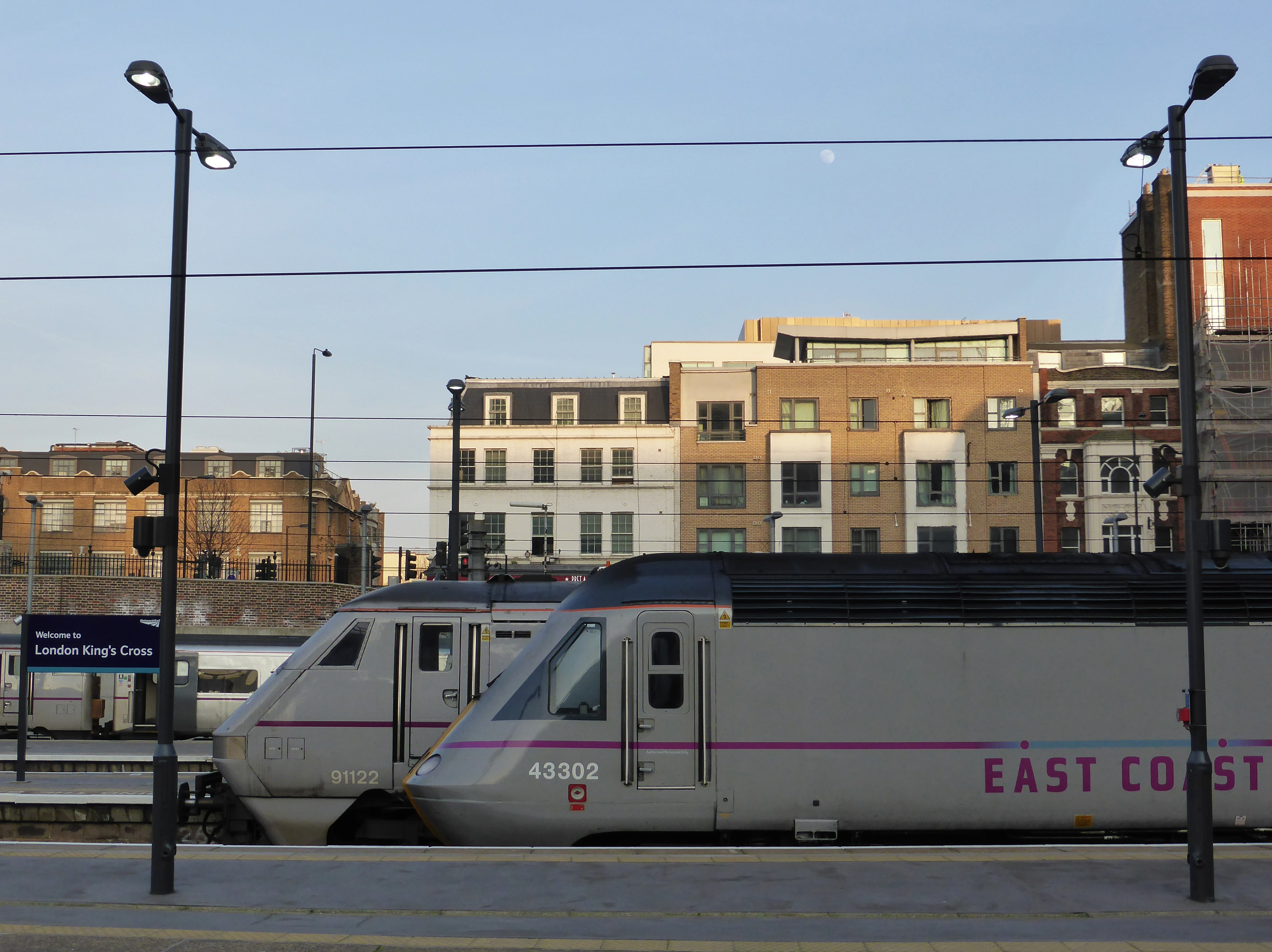
Lights similar to street lights are used at train stations; these are at London King's Cross

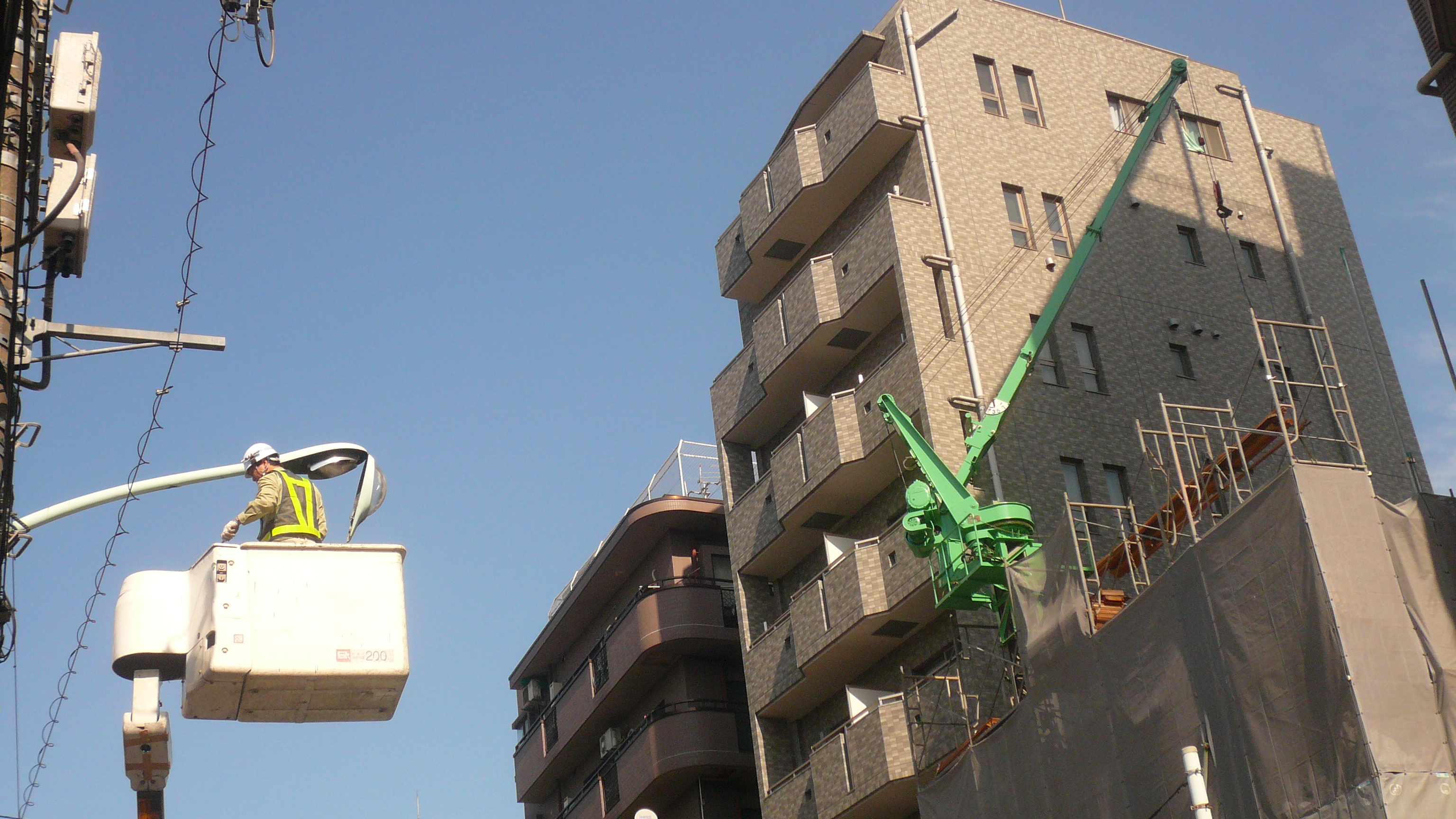
A man performing maintenance on a street light in Tokyo

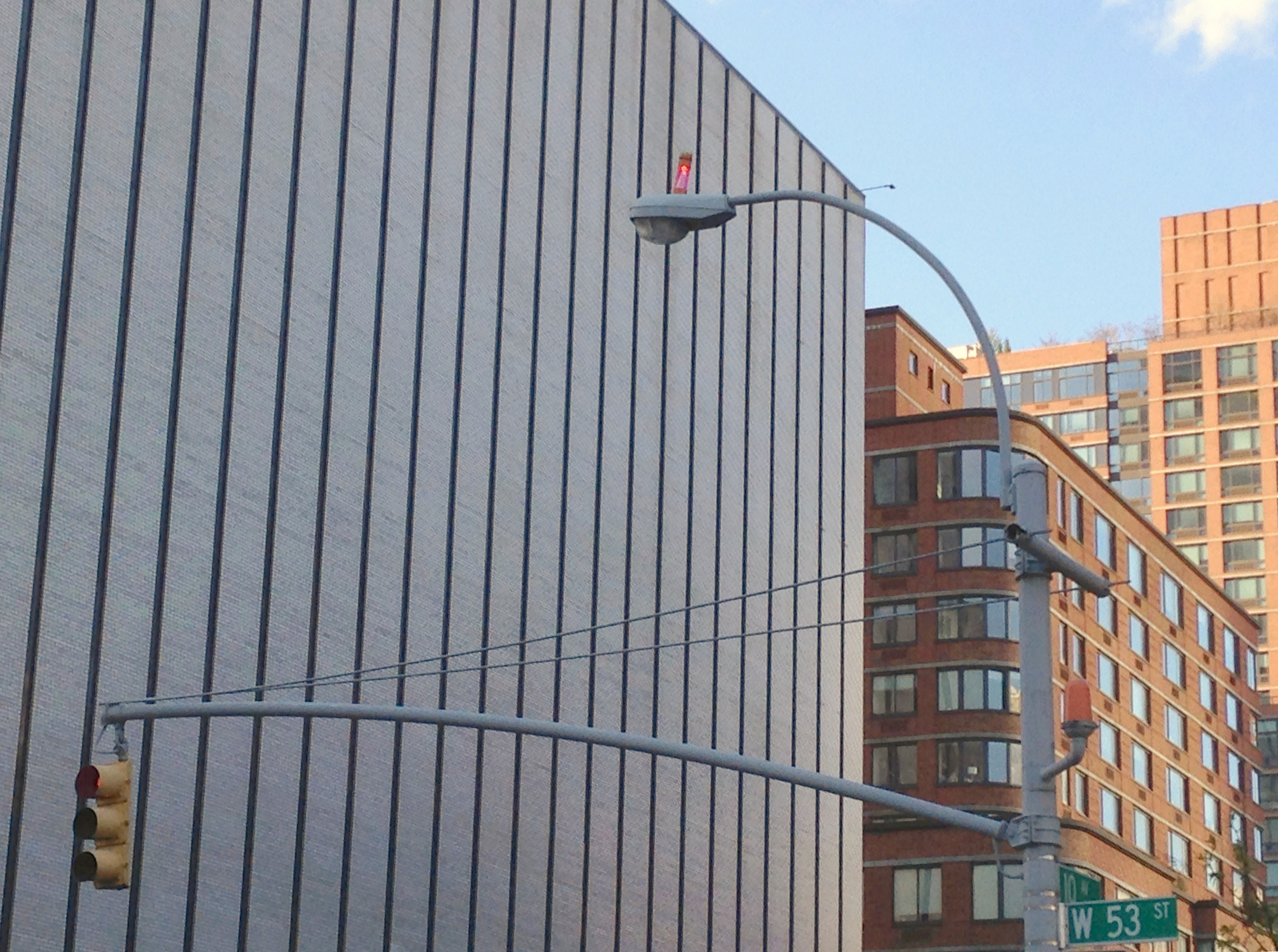
New York City fire alarm pull box indicator mounted on street light

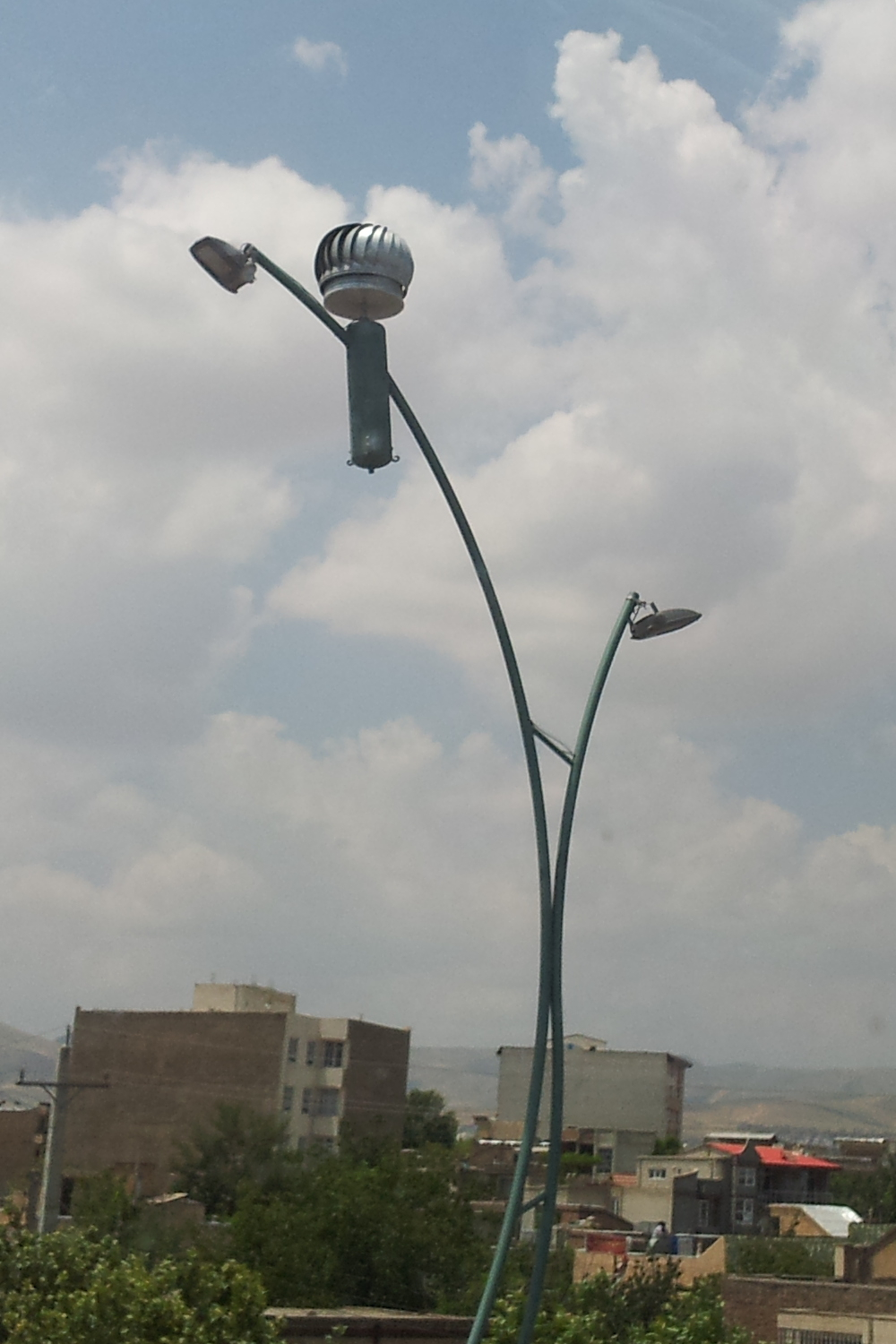
A wind-powered street light in Urmia, Iran

== See also ==
- Charging station
- Floodlight
- Gas lighting
- History of street lighting in the United States
- Intelligent street lighting
- Lighting-up time
- Light pollution
- List of light sources
- Solar street light
- Street furniture
- Street light interference

== Bibliography ==
- Fierro, Alfred (1996). Histoire et dictionnaire de Paris. Robert Laffont. ISBN 978-2-221-07862-4.
- Lobsey, Ian (1988). City of light. Peel-Cunningham County Council. ISBN 978-0-7316-5778-0.
