= Phosco P107 =

The Phosco P107 was the lamp standard of choice for British council estates in the 1960s.

It is a post top lantern with a single bulb. The lantern can run G.L.S. lamps up to 200 W, MB/U or MBF/U lamps up to 125W or 45-60W sodium lamps. It is available with a large or small canopy. The ballast and the capacitor is kept in the actual column, It was first installed mainly around the City of Liverpool, then on housing estates throughout the United Kingdom. Low output columns were very suitable for the Radburn type layout popular on cottage estates in the 1960s.
