= Solar dial =

A solar dial is a type of time switch used primarily for controlling lighting.

The benefit of a solar dial over a conventional 'on-off' time switch is the ability to 'track' the sunrise and sunset times for a particular latitude (which is specified when the unit is purchased). The solar dial 'adjusts' itself by a fractional amount each day, thereby ensuring that street lighting is switched on and off when required throughout the year. Many dials also have an additional 'part night' facility allowing for a switch-off in the middle of the night, and then back on in the morning if needed. This 'part night' option was widely adopted in the United Kingdom for street lighting in the 1970s and 1980s in order to conserve energy. Some solar dial switches have a clockwork or battery 'reserve' to maintain time accuracy in cases of power outage. If this is lacking, the switch would have to be reset every time the power fails, a labour-intensive task.

Frequently, one time switch with a heavier switch rating is used to control a whole series of lighting columns, perhaps one side of a street, and another to control the opposite side. Many columns are however fitted with individual clocks, especially on alleyways, pathways, and areas in which a single column stands alone. Sometimes the time switch is housed in a box fitted to a wall or telegraph pole, and the lanterns are powered/switched by means of an extra (fifth) core on the overhead cables.

== Obsolescence ==
The solar dial time switch has largely been superseded by photocell control, which is cheaper and requires less maintenance. Solar dials are still used for lighting stairwells and car parks, and in some cases local authorities may request them for street lighting, though this is rare. Solar dials are often found in the rural United Kingdom, but as these fail they are sometimes replaced by a photocell, usually on a new lantern and sometimes with a whole new column. More recently, digital sunrise/sunset tracking time switches have appeared on the market, but these are generally too expensive for large scale use in street lighting and have not been adopted for this purpose, except in a few rare instances.

Sangamo still manufacture and sell three models of solar dials from their factory in Port Glasgow. Solar dials continue to be used in retail premises, security systems, lighting and industrial heating systems. Old examples from the 1950s, 1960s and 1970s are collected by enthusiasts.

== See also ==
- Street Light
