= Gomel (disambiguation) =

Gomel is a city in Belarus.

Gomel may also refer to:

== People ==
- Aakarshit Gomel (born 1993), Indian cricketer
- Benjamin Gomel (born 1998), French footballer
- Bob Gomel (born 1933), American photojournalist

== Places ==
- Gomel region, of Belarus
  - Gomel district
- Gomel Governorate, an administrative division of the Russian SFSR 1919–1926

== Sports ==
- FC Gomel, a Belarusian football club
- FC DSK Gomel, a Belarusian football club
- HC Gomel, a Belarusian handball club
- HK Gomel, a Belarusian ice hockey team

== See also ==
- Birkat HaGomel, a Jewish blessing
