= John Billings =

John Billings may refer to:

- John Billings (Australian physician) (1918–2007), family planning pioneer
- John Shaw Billings (1838–1913), American librarian, building designer, and surgeon
- John Shaw Billings (editor) (1891–1975), his grandson, first editor of Life magazine
