= Peter Martin =

Peter Martin may refer to:

== Entertainment ==
- Peter Martin (actor) (1941–2023), British actor
- Peter Martin (jazz pianist) (born 1970), American jazz pianist
- Peter Martin (photographer), Canadian photographer
- Peter B. Martin (1915–1992), American photographer

== Politics ==
- Peter F. Martin (born 1941), American state representative from Rhode Island
- Peter Francis Martin (1867–1937), contractor and political figure in Nova Scotia, Canada
- Peter Martin (politician) (born 1971), member of the Northern Ireland Assembly

== Sports ==
- Peter Martin (athlete) (born 1962), Paralympian athlete from New Zealand
- Peter Martin (Australian footballer) (1875–1918), Australian rules footballer
- Peter Martin (basketball) (born 1968), Filipino former basketball player and coach
- Peter Martin (Canadian football) (1920–1996)
- Peter Martin (English footballer) (born 1950), English footballer with Darlington and Barnsley
- Peter Martin (cricketer) (born 1968), English cricketer
- Peter Martin (rugby league), Australian rugby league player

== Other ==
- Peter Martin (STP) (died 1645), Irish preacher
- Peter E. Martin (1882–1944), American auto industry executive
- Peter D. Martin (1919–1988), college professor and bookstore owner
- Peter Martin (professor) (born 1940), American professor of English and author
- Peter Martin (darts player) (born 1975), Slovak darts player
- Peter Martin (economist) (born c. 1980), Australian commentator on economics
- Peter W. Martin, American professor of law
- Peter Martin, pen-name of Christine Chaundler (1887–1972), British children's author
- Peter Martin (author) (1907–1962), American author

== See also ==
- Peter Martins (born 1946), Danish ballet dancer and choreographer
- Hans-Peter Martin (born 1957), Austrian journalist and Member of Parliament
- Peter Martyn (disambiguation)
- Petr Martin (born 1989), Czech squash player
