= Daniel Longwell =

Daniel Longwell (July 11, 1899 – November 20, 1968) was an American magazine editor. He was a founder and editor of Life magazine and served as the chairman of its editor's board until 1954.

== Early life and education ==
Longwell was born in Omaha, Nebraska. He rejected an appointment to the United States Military Academy and enrolled in Columbia University, graduating in 1922.

== Career ==
After college, Longwell worked for Doubleday and supervised publication of the works of a number of authors including Edna Ferber, Ellen Glasgow, Stephen Vincent Benét, Kenneth Roberts. He also edited a number of picture books.

In 1934, he left Doubleday and joined Time Inc. He was appointed special assistant to the magazine's managing editor, John Shaw Billings and was tasked by Henry Luce to create a "picture magazine". Longwell then headed an experimental group that drew up trial issues of the magazine that was launched as Life magazine in 1936. He was one of the three original editors of the magazine, along with Henry Luce and John Shaw Billings.

From 1936 to 1944, he was the executive editor of Life. He served as the managing editor from 1944 to 1946, and the chairman of its board of editors until his retirement in 1954.

From 1954 to 1956, he was the President of the American Federation of Arts, of which he had been a trustee for 5 years. He was also a trustee of the National Book Committee, which administered the National Book Award from 1950 to 1974.

He retired to Neosho, Missouri, where he owned a farm that he spent time on during his boyhood. He is also the namesake of the Longwell Museum at Crowder College, to which he and his wife donated many works of art from their private collection. He was also credited for making Neosho the "Flowerbox City" by initiating the flowerbox program with a grant from the Rockefeller Foundation.

A fellow Life editor, Loudon Wainwright wrote that "Possibly more than anyone else, Longwell rates consideration as the father of LIFE."

== Personal life ==
Longwell died in Neosho, Missouri, in 1968. He was a member of the River Club, the Coffee House Club, the Century Association, and the Columbia University Club of New York.

Longwell and his wife, Mary Fraser Longwell were subjects of a 2015 book Larger Than Life: The Legacy of Daniel Longwell and Mary Fraser Longwell. The author, Judith Haas Smith, grew up on the same block where they lived after their retirement and she became close friends with the couple. Longwell eventually became her mentor. In 2010, Smith discovered that Longwell's papers were stored at Columbia University and spent the next five years reading the 89 archival boxes of correspondence kept from Longwell's 35-year career in publishing to write the biography.
