= Mary Hamman =

American writer and editor

Mary Hamman (August 2, 1907 – November 18, 1984) was an American writer and editor. She was an editor for Pictorial Review, Good Housekeeping, Mademoiselle, as well as the modern living editor for LIFE and editor-in-chief for Bride & Home.

== Biography ==
She was born in Baltimore, Maryland, a daughter of Johns Hopkins clinician, Dr. Louis Hamman. Her move to Manhattan was during prohibition, which fueled many stories.

She was one of a "trio of formidable and colorful women", the other two being Mary Letherbee, movie editor, and Sally Kirkland, fashion editor. Together they led the "back of the book" at LIFE and were given free rein by Ed Thompson as managing editor and later editor in chief. When Thompson went on to found the Smithsonian Magazine Hamman would often write the humor page inside the back cover.

Jack Coggins, a friend from the days of LIFE and later a neighbor, said:

I've never laughed more than at some of Mary's stories — they came out visually like comic strips. You could see her father's Christmas turkey from a grateful patient, safely anaesthetized, plucked and put over-night in the ice-box — until it leaped out at the first early riser and ran naked and squawking through the startled house...

Sho Sho (Mrs Colin MacLeod), a childhood friend from Baltimore, who with her husband was a neighbor in Manhattan and Bucks County, remembered a trip returning from New Hampshire:

Mess loved her 1941 Buick — she kept it well into the 1960s. One summer she and I bought a flock of antiques in New Hampshire — so many that we had to buy an old trailer to get them to Bucks county. On the road down we were stopped twice by troopers and at every toll booth. "No trailers allowed, lady!" Each time she'd bat her eyes and smile, "But sir, this isn't a trailer — it's a furniture van."Either the rules didn't mention furniture vans or her smile was irresistible, because we made it to the farm by 3:00 a.m.

Hamman liked nothing better than a good prank or joke, as did her father. There are many stories similar to this one from her brother Louis Hamman, Jr., a surgeon:

Years ago, I did a number of breast enhancement operations on go-go dancers (to help pay my daughter's tuition bills, I explained). Later, I received a letter from a Lydia Thomas of Philadelphia complaining that her breasts had continued to grow to their present monstrous size (photo enclosed, showing unbelievable mammaries) and that I had to do something to stop it. I wrote back, telling her to come in for an antidote shot, warning her not to smoke pot because it reacts with the Silastic to form an unusual growth hormone. The letter came back, "No such address." The photo, I later discovered, was cleverly mounted to look like a Polaroid, but actually was a ckip from a skin magazine. Mess said later that she felt I'd eventually smell a rat but concocting the letter had been such fun.

== Books edited ==
- The Mademoiselle Handbook: for the Girl With a Job and a Future, Hamman, Mary and the Editors of Mademoiselle. Whittlesey House., New York, 1946.
- Picture Cookbook by the Editors of LIFE, first published 1958, with second and third editions in 1959 and 1960.
