= Shelley Smith Mydans =

American writer

Shelley Mydans
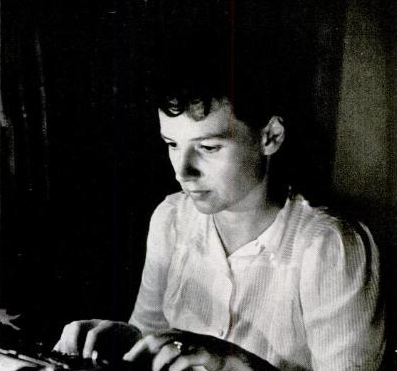
- Smith Mydans reporting from China in 1942
- Born: Shelley Smith; May 20, 1915; Palo Alto, California
- Died: March 7, 2002 (aged 86); Sacramento, California
- Occupation: Journalist
- Employer: Life magazine
- Known for: novelist, war reporter
- Spouse: Carl Mydans

Shelley Smith Mydans (born Shelley Smith; May 20, 1915 – March 7, 2002) was an American novelist, journalist and prisoner of war.

== Life ==
Mydans was born in California, where she grew up thinking of being a dancer, although her father was a university professor of journalism. As a child, she was one of the first participants in Lewis Terman's landmark Genetic Studies of Genius longitudinal study. She moved to New York to work for the Literary Digest, and became a journalist for Life magazine, where she met Carl Mydans in 1938. They married the following year and they were the first husband-and-wife team to be employed by the magazine.

== World War II ==
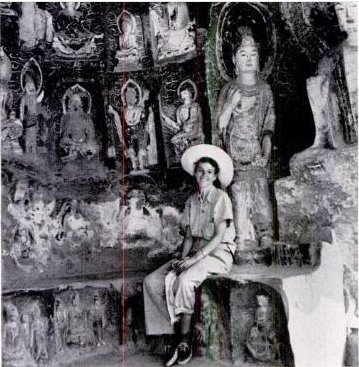
in a Chinese temple

They were sent initially to the United Kingdom to cover the war but they left for China when France was defeated. They eventually traveled over 45,000 miles visiting Scandinavia, Portugal, Italy, Chongqing in China and the British colony of Hong Kong. Mydans described her job as writer and researcher only occasionally getting attribution when a writer was not available. They were both caught by the Japanese in the Philippines and they were held first at the Santo Tomas Internment Camp in Manila and later at the Chapei Internment Center in Shanghai. They were lucky to be exchanged in a prisoner swap in December 1943, and they both then returned to the war. Mydans was to write her first novel called "Open City" based on her time as a prisoner of the Japanese and this was published in 1945.

In 1945 her husband went to Manila where he was to record the iconic moment of MacArthur's return but this was denied to Mydans and she was sent to Guam to work on a restricted basis. "I was accredited to the navy, but I was not - because I was a woman - allowed to cover action on naval ships or planes and my articles had to be confined to such things as the navy flight nurses and marine base camps."

== Post war ==
Mydans wrote for radio for the American ABC network after the war including for the news program The March of Time. She resigned when the first of her children were born. She wrote two more novels — the first was based around the life of Thomas Becket and the other was based in 8th-century Japan. She and her husband also wrote a non-fiction book about post war terrorism.

Mydans died in Larchmont, New York in 2002.
