= Pessimism porn =

Term for being thrilled from pessimistic behavior

Pessimism porn is a neologism used to describe the alleged eschatological and survivalist thrill some people derive from pessimistic behavior, specifically predicting, reading and fantasizing about societal collapse through means such as the destruction of the world's economic system. The term was coined in 2009 during the Great Recession.

== Origin ==
Pessimism porn's coinage is attributed to Hugo Lindgren when he wrote about the concept in New York in February 2009, in the waning months of the Great Recession. Lindgren wrote of the attraction of predicting and planning for economic collapse:

Like real porn, the economic variety gives you the illusion of control, and similarly it only leaves you hungry for more. But econo-porn also feeds a powerful sense of intellectual vanity. You walk the streets feeling superior to all these heedless knaves who have no clue what’s coming down the pike. By making yourself miserable about the frightful hell that awaits us, you feel better. Pessimism can be bliss too.

Geoffrey James suggests the change in programming of news channels to infotainment has played a role in the spread of pessimism porn. Instead of news programming designed to put the issues of the day in a context understandable to viewers, stories follow an "if it bleeds it leads" priority that increase people's fear and anxiety followed by advertisements that offer a way to soothe those anxieties, such as ones for companies for investing in gold to hedge against economic collapse.

Thomas P. M. Barnett, chief analyst at Wikistrat, has criticized apocalyptic predictions for the global economy as problematically short-sighted because "human history is progress, so if you're constantly having to screen out the good to spot the bad, your vision will be unduly narrow....you must consistently discount advances as 'illusions' and 'buying time' and so on, and after a while, you're just this broken clock who's dead-on twice a day."

In her book Apocalypse and Post-Politics: The Romance of the End, Regent University professor Mary Manjikian linked Lindgren's concept of pessimism porn to Frank Kermode's "eschatological anxiety," which he wrote about in his landmark The Sense of an Ending. Kermode argued that "worrying about the apocalypse is actually a feature of societies undergoing significant social and technological transitions."

== Purveyors ==
Purveyors of pessimism porn tend to cite as examples of an approaching economic Armageddon the scenario of the world, particularly the Chinese, giving up on the dollar as a reserve currency; movements such as Occupy Wall Street; and the collapse of the European Union and the Euro. Mainstream economists usually disregard the econometrics of people who forecast the collapse of society and the need to resort to survivalism because of what they perceive as the imminent end of the western financial model.

Lindgren cited the blog Calculated Risk as a "reliable turn-on" for its author's knack for writing about the dangers of plummeting rates for various goods, such as commercial paper. Peter Schiff and trend forecaster Gerald Celente were singled out by ABC News as purveyors of pessimism porn. Celente has predicted that in 2012 the United States will see food riots, shantytowns in Central Park and "economic martial law", and that the only protections from the chaos to come are "the three g's—gold, guns and a get-away plan."

Alex Pareene called Nouriel Roubini the "Joe Francis of Pessimism Porn" for writing multiple doomsday columns for major publications, including a February 2009 column in The Washington Post declaring that unless the U.S. government seized and nationalized all banks the system would collapse.

== See also ==
- Doomer
- Global catastrophic risk
- Millenarianism
- Paul R. Ehrlich
