= Carl Mydans =

American photographer

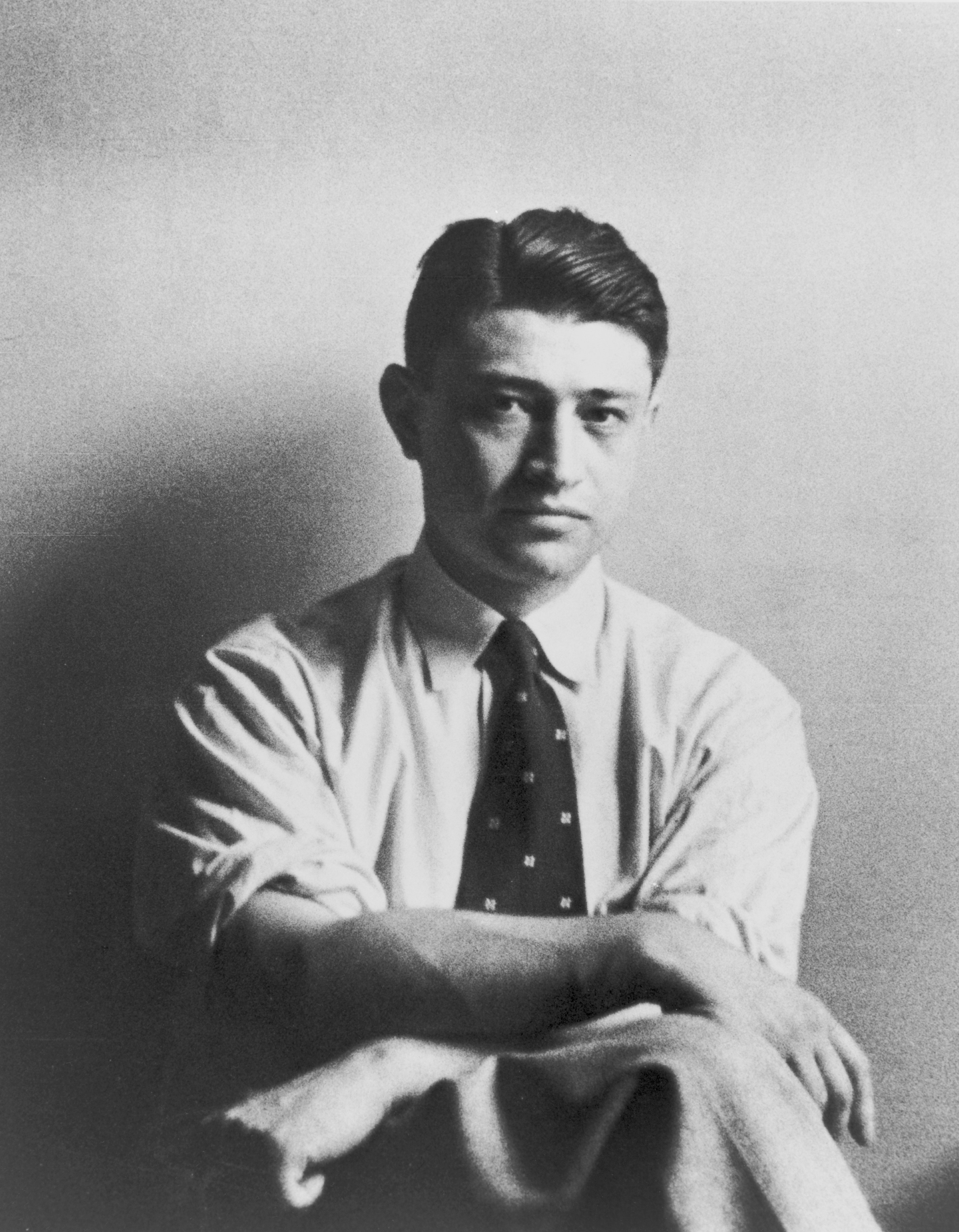
- Carl Mydans in 1935
- Born: May 20, 1907; Medford, Massachusetts
- Died: August 16, 2004 (aged 97); Larchmont, New York
- Employer: Life magazine
- Spouse: Shelley Mydans

Carl Mydans (May 20, 1907 – August 16, 2004) was an American photographer who worked for the Farm Security Administration and Life magazine.

== Life ==
Mydans grew up playing on the Mystic River near Medford, near Boston, Massachusetts. His father was an oboist.

Mydans became devoted to photography while in college at Boston University. While working on the Boston University News he abandoned childhood dreams of being a surgeon or a boat builder in favor of journalism. His first reporting jobs were for The Boston Globe and the Boston Herald. After college, he went to New York as a writer for American Banker and then in 1935 to Washington to join a group of photographers in the Farm Security Administration. There he worked with other photographers like Dorothea Lange and Ben Shahn to document the conditions of the American rural workers.

In 1935, he traveled throughout New England and America's South, documenting the end of a rural-based economy, and gained a measure of renown for his images of bedraggled Arkansas farmers and their families. It was the Great Depression, and the poorest of America's poor were devastated by the economic downturn. "One picture, of a Tennessee family living in a hut built on an abandoned truck chassis, portrays the misery of the times," noted Mydans' Times of London obituary, "as starkly as any photographs by his more celebrated contemporaries."

In 1936, he joined Life as one of its earliest staff photographers (Alfred Eisenstaedt, Margaret Bourke-White, Thomas McAvoy and Peter Stackpole were the original staff photographers) and a pioneering photojournalist.

== World War II ==
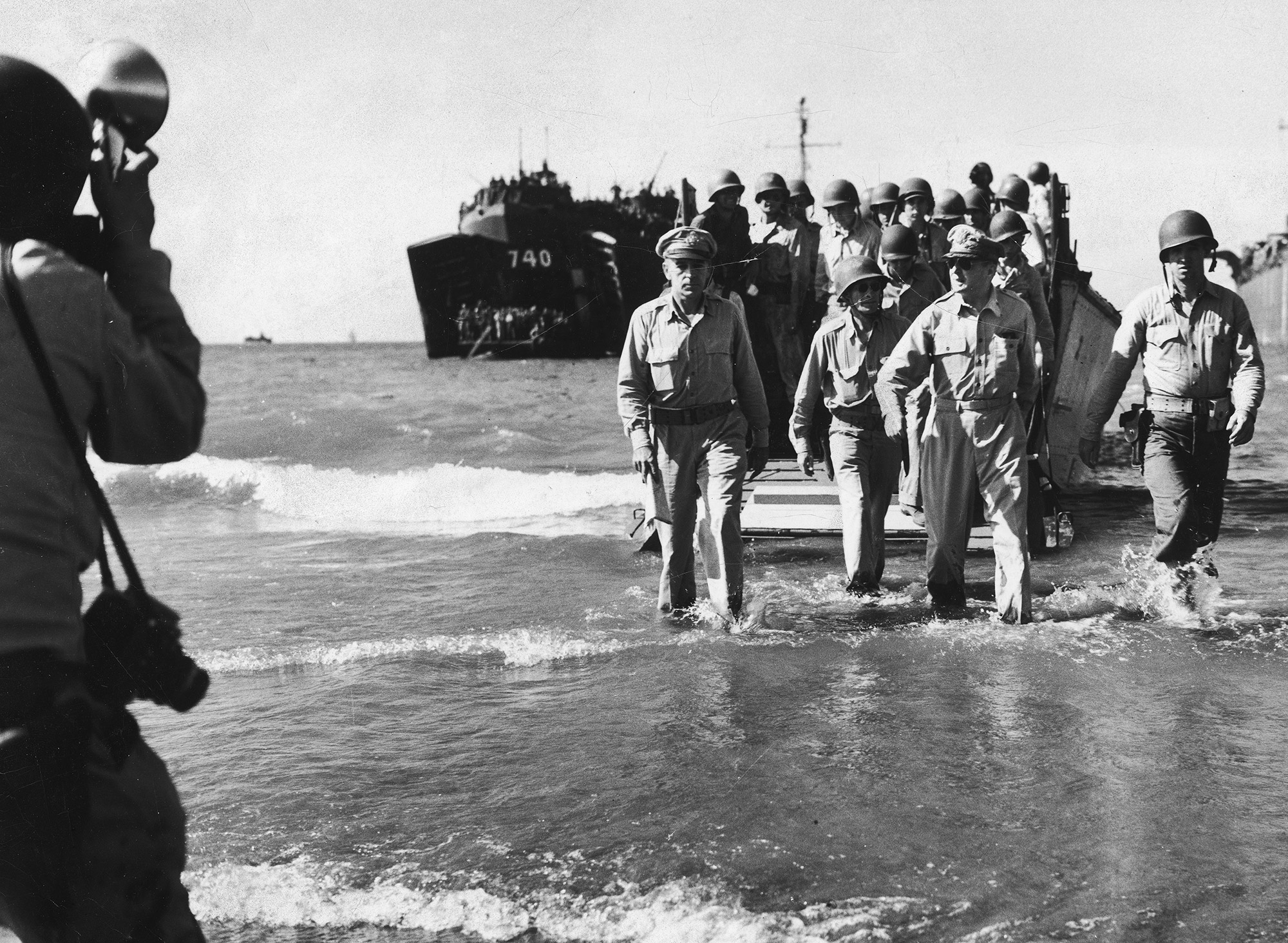
MacArthur Returns (1945), Mydans' most notable photograph

Mydans recorded photographic images of life and death throughout Europe and Asia during World War II travelling over 45,000 miles (72,000 km). In 1941, the photographer and Shelley Mydans were the first husband and wife team on the magazine's staff. Shelley and Carl were captured by the invading Japanese forces in the Philippines and interned for nearly a year at the Santo Tomas Internment Camp in Manila, then for another year in Shanghai, China, before they were released as part of a prisoner-of-war exchange in December 1943.

After their release, Mydans was sent back into Europe for pivotal battles in Italy and France. By 1944, Mydans was back in the Philippines to cover MacArthur's return. Mydans snapped the moment when General Douglas MacArthur purposefully strode ashore in the Philippines in 1945, The legendary officer had declared, when the Japanese came in 1942, "I shall return," and Mydans' photograph of the formidable general immortalized that claim for posterity. Some asserted that it must have been staged, but Mydans resolutely defended the photograph as entirely spontaneous, though he did admit that MacArthur was savvy about public-relations opportunities. The general had appeared in Mydans' other memorable image from that assignment, watching with other top U.S. brass as a Japanese delegation signed the official documents of surrender on an early September day in 1945. "No one I have ever known in public life had a better understanding of the drama and power of a picture," Mydans, said about MacArthur.

Mydans also captured the signing of Japan's surrender aboard the USS. Missouri.

Some of Mydans's other famous pictures include: the bombing of Chongqing, angry French citizens shaving the heads of women accused of sleeping with Germans during the occupation in 1944; a roomful of excited royal youngsters and their staid older relatives in 1954; and a 1950 portrait of Douglas MacArthur smoking a pipe.

But he also photographed the war from the viewpoint of the ordinary soldier or sailor. "Resourceful and unruffled, Mr. Mydans sent back pictures of combat that even now define how some remember World War II, Korea, and other conflicts," noted The New York Times.

== Post-war ==
Despite his two years in captivity, Mydans bore no ill will toward the Asian nation, and accepted an assignment to head Time-Life's Tokyo bureau with his wife. Time-Life was the publisher of Time, Life and other top magazines, which Mydans continued to provide with an array of visual stories. In 1948, he just happened to be in the city of Fukui when a destructive earthquake struck; some of his shots were taken on the street while buildings were collapsing around him.

After covering the Korean War, Mydans traveled the globe for the next two decades for Life before the publication folded in 1972. When it was relaunched several years later, he was still listed as one of its contributing photographers. He died on August 16, 2004, of heart failure at his home in Larchmont, New York, at the age of 97. Widowed in 2002, Mydans was survived by his daughter, Shelley, a California attorney; and his son, Seth, Asia correspondent for The New York Times.

== Gallery ==
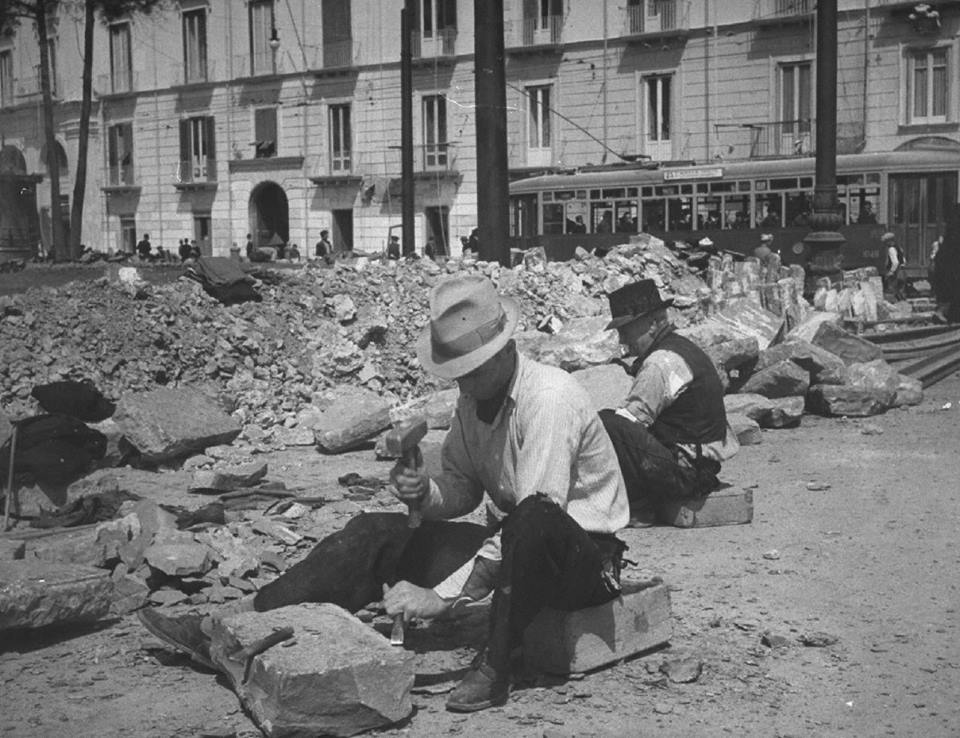
Napoli, Piazza Vittoria 13 (1940)

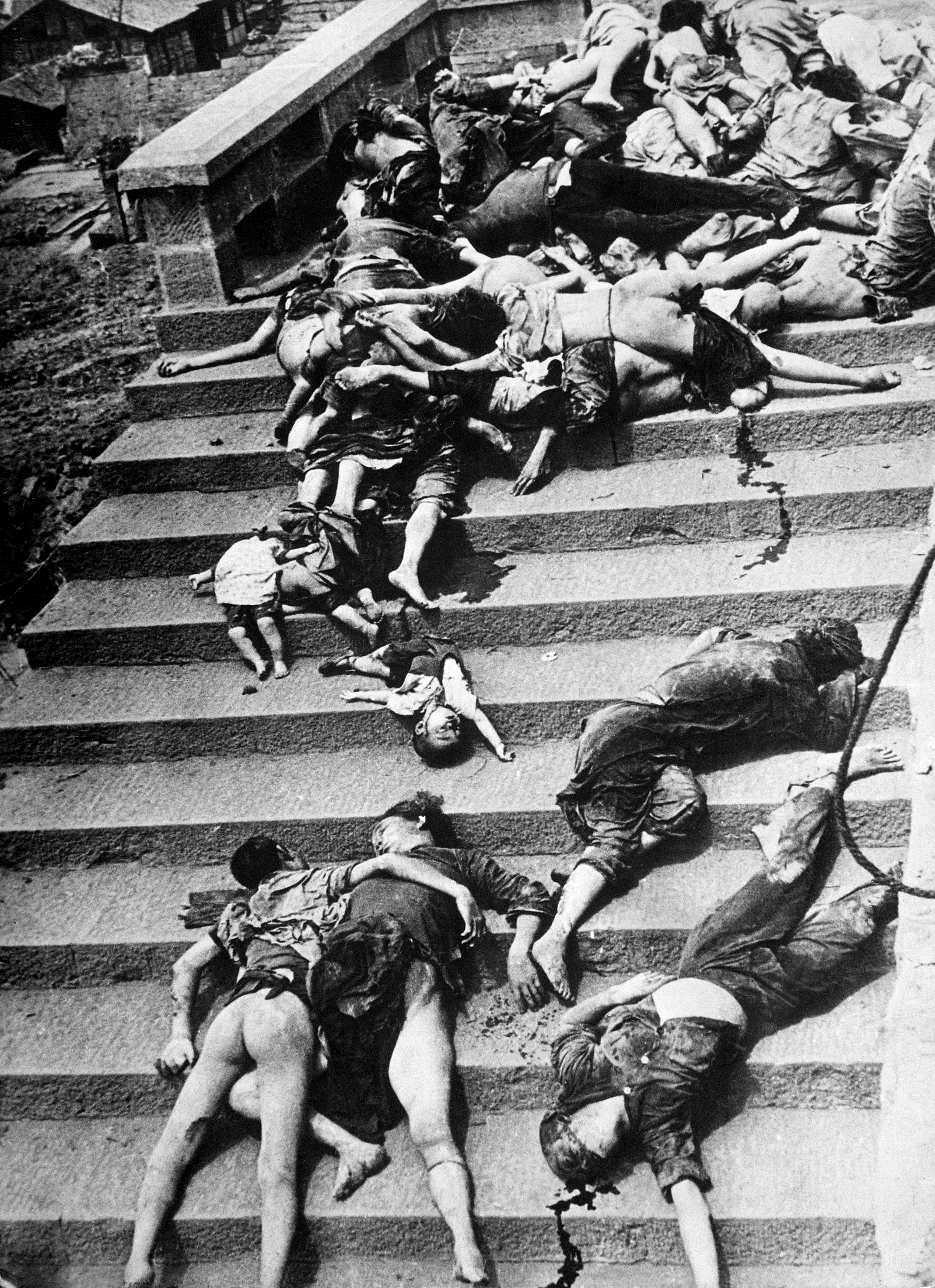
Casualties of a mass panic in Chungking, China (1941)

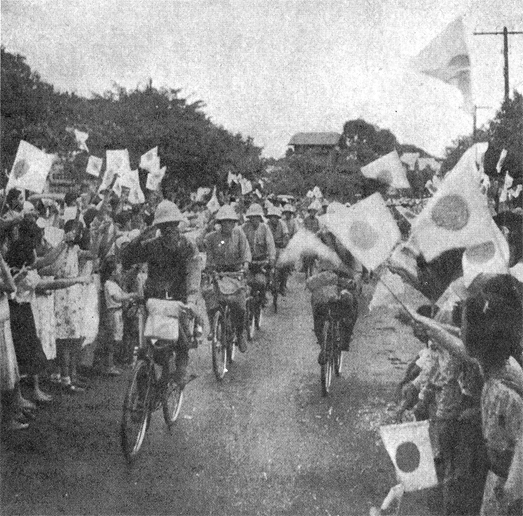
Imperial Japanese army enters Manila on Bicycles (1942)

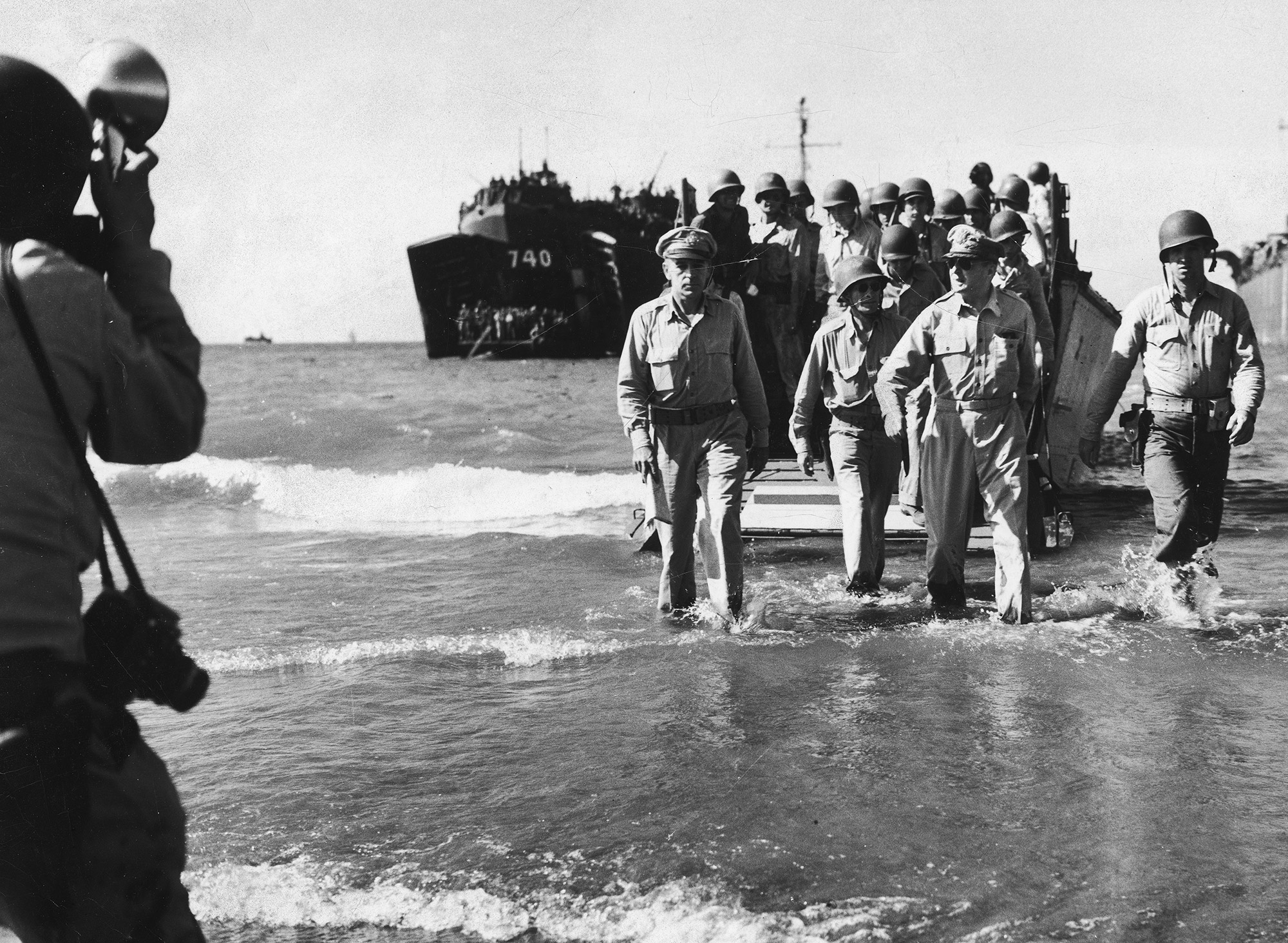
MacArthur Returns (1945)

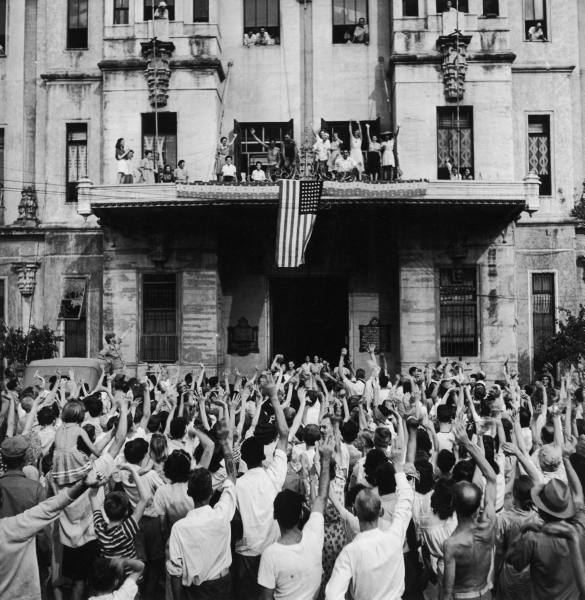
The University of Santo Tomas in the Philippines during its liberation from the Japanese regime (1945)

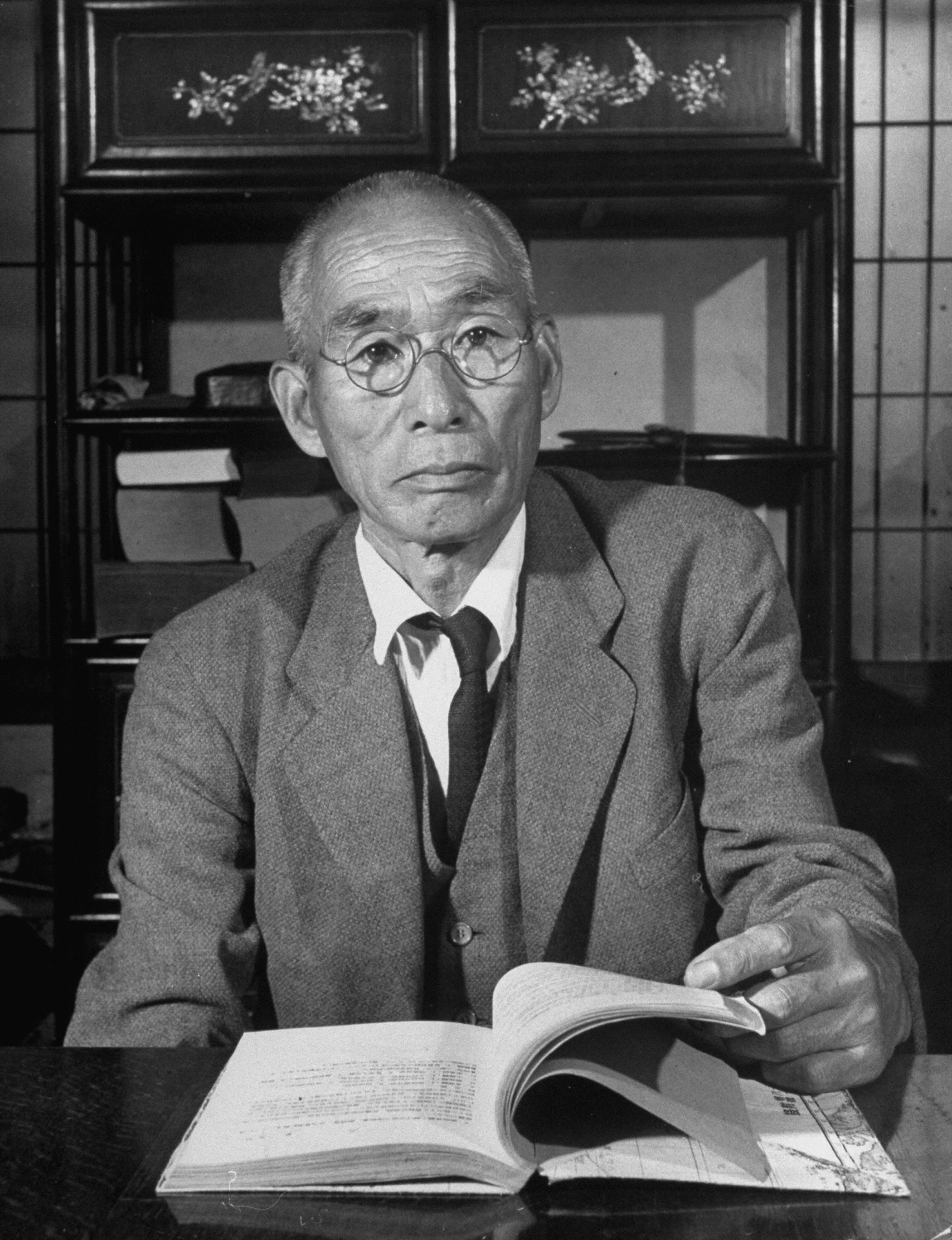
Takeo Kurita (1949)

== Books ==
- IN THE SHADOW OF THE CAPITOL. Melbourne: Pataphysics Books, 2012. ISBN 978-0-987-3387-0-9. Photographs by Carl Mydans for the U.S. Resettlement Administration, September 1935 (Farm Security Administration/Office of War Information Collection, Library of Congress). Edited and with text by Tom Clark (poet). Designed by Yanni Florence.
- Carl Mydans. "More Than Meets the Eye", 1959 Harper Row. New York
- Carl Mydans. "Carl Mydans – Photojournalist. 1985. Harry N. Abrams. New York
- Carl and Shelly Mydans. "The Violent Peace", 1968. Atheneum.

== Sources ==
- Mark Edward Harris. "Carl Mydans: A life goes to war". In: Camera & Darkroom (ed.), Volume 16 Number 6 (June 1994). Beverly Hills, CA. pp. 22–31.
