= Howell Conant =

American photographer (1909–1999)

Howell T. Conant
- Born: March 13, 1916; Sturgeon Bay, Wisconsin
- Died: March 11, 1999 (aged 82); Carefree, Arizona, US
- Education: University of Wisconsin; Art Center College of Design
- Occupation: Photographer
- Known for: Portraits of Grace Kelly

Howell Thomas Conant, Sr. (March 13, 1916 – March 11, 1999) was an American fashion photographer noted for his portraits of the American actress and later Princess Consort of Monaco, Grace Kelly.

== Life ==
Conant's father was a professional photographer who owned a studio in Marinette, Wisconsin. Conant studied photography at the University of Wisconsin and at the Art Center College of Design in Pasadena. During World War II Conant was stationed at Pearl Harbor and was part of the Naval photographic team operating under Admiral Chester W. Nimitz. Conant later took pictures for Life, Look and Paris Match among other publications, and photographed celebrities from Elizabeth Taylor and Audrey Hepburn to American presidents Richard Nixon and John F. Kennedy. Conant died at his home in Carefree, Arizona in 1999. He was survived by his wife, Dorothy; with whom he had four children.

=== Grace Kelly ===
In 1955, Conant received a commission from Photoplay magazine to conduct a cover shoot with Grace Kelly, who was a prominent film actress at the time. After the Photoplay shoot, Grace Kelly vacationed in Jamaica alongside her sister and extended an invitation to Conant. He photographed her in a naturalistic setting without makeup, which was a departure from the traditional portrayal of actresses. The resulting photographs were published in the June 24 issue of Collier's magazine, with a celebrated photo of Kelly rising from the water with wet hair making the cover.

Conant wrote that he thought that Grace Kelly's sole flaw in her appearance was her jaw, which he considered too square. He would use a dog or a baby to disguise it when photographing her below her jaw. Conant later said that "You trusted Grace's beauty...You knew it wasn't built from clothes and makeup...this was Grace: natural, unpretentious".

Grace Kelly sailed on the SS Constitution from New York to Monaco for her marriage to Prince Rainier in 1956. Many photographers were on board the ship, but only Conant had access to Grace Kelly. Following her marriage Conant was the unofficial photographer to the House of Grimaldi, and extensively photographed Grace Kelly, her husband and their three children. In 1992 Conant published Grace, a book of photographs that he took during Kelly's 26-year reign as Princess of Monaco.

In September 1982, Conant was preparing for a trip to Monaco to capture the family's official Christmas portrait. However, upon learning of Princess Grace's tragic death in a car accident, he departed for Monaco without his photographic equipment. Despite this unexpected turn of events, Conant maintained his friendship with Prince Rainier until the prince's passing.
