= Life (magazine) =

American photo newsmagazine (since 1936)

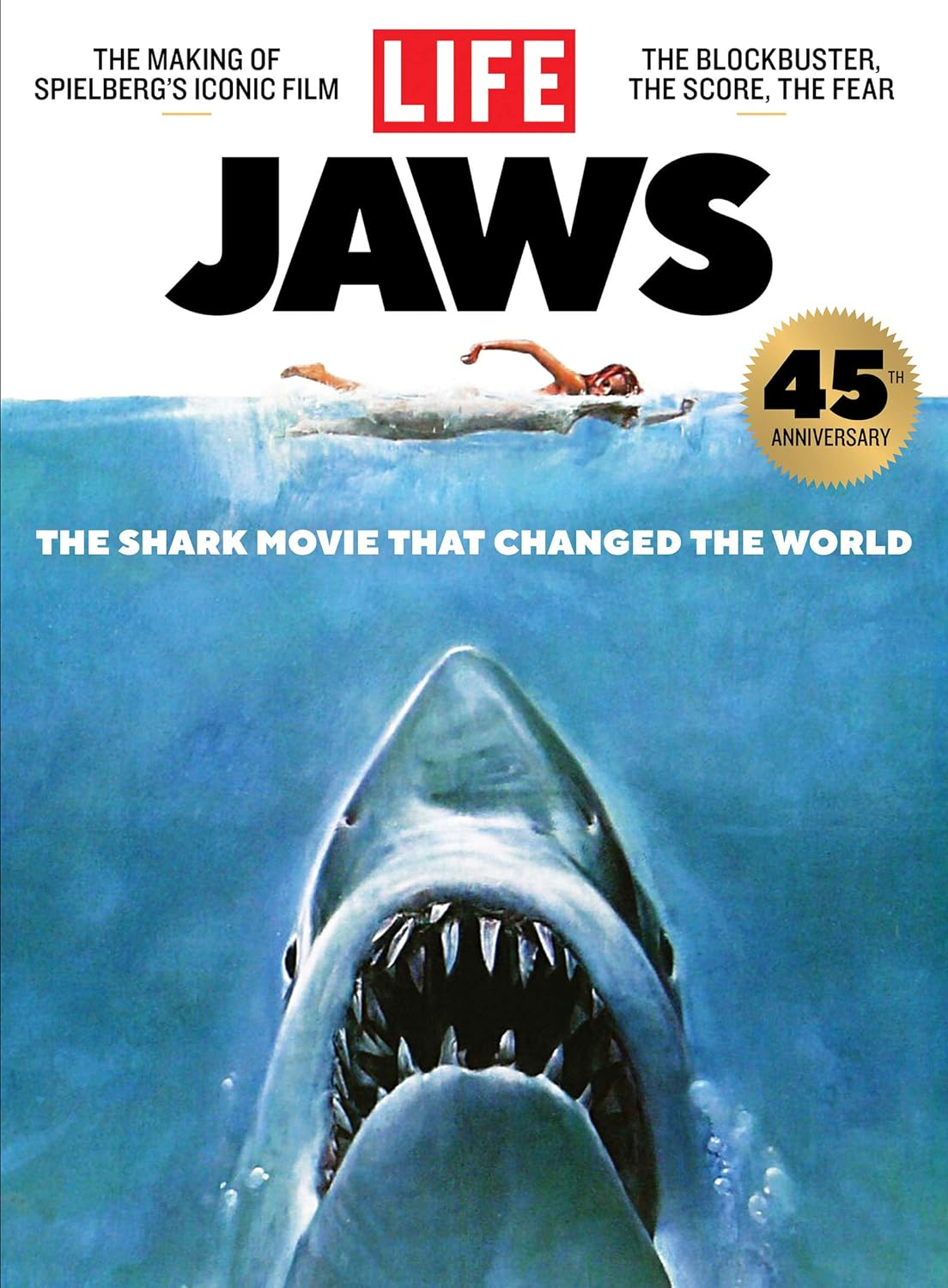
- Cover of the issue from June 19, 2020, commemorating the 45th anniversary of Jaws
- Editor: Hugo Lindgren
- Creative Director: Richard Turley
- Categories: News
- Frequency: Weekly (1936–1972); Monthly (1978–2000)
- Total circulation: 1,000,000 (1937)
- First issue: November 23, 1936; 89 years ago
- Company: Time Inc. (1936–2018); Meredith Corporation (2018–2021); People Inc. (since 2021); Bedford Media (since 2024)
- Country: United States
- Based in: New York City, New York, U.S.
- Language: English
- Website: life.com
- ISSN: 0024-3019

Life (stylised in all caps) is an American quarterly news magazine. Originally published by Time Inc. until its 2018 acquisition by Meredith Corporation, since 2021 it has been owned by People Inc. and since 2026 is published by Bedford Media. Since 2026, Hugo Lindgren has served as editorial director and Richard Turley as creative director.

Life began publication in 1936, after Henry Luce purchased the 1883 humour magazine Life for its name. It was published weekly until 1972 when it transitioned to publishing "special" issues before operating as a monthly from 1978 to 2000. It then published irregular "special" issues until 2026 when it relaunched as a quarterly.

The magazine's place in the history of photojournalism is considered one of its most important contributions to the world of publishing. From 1936 to the 1960s, Life was a wide-ranging general-interest and news magazine known for its photojournalism. During this period, it was one of the most popular magazines in the United States, with its circulation regularly reaching a quarter of the U.S. population.

== History ==
=== 20th century ===
==== Weekly news magazine ====
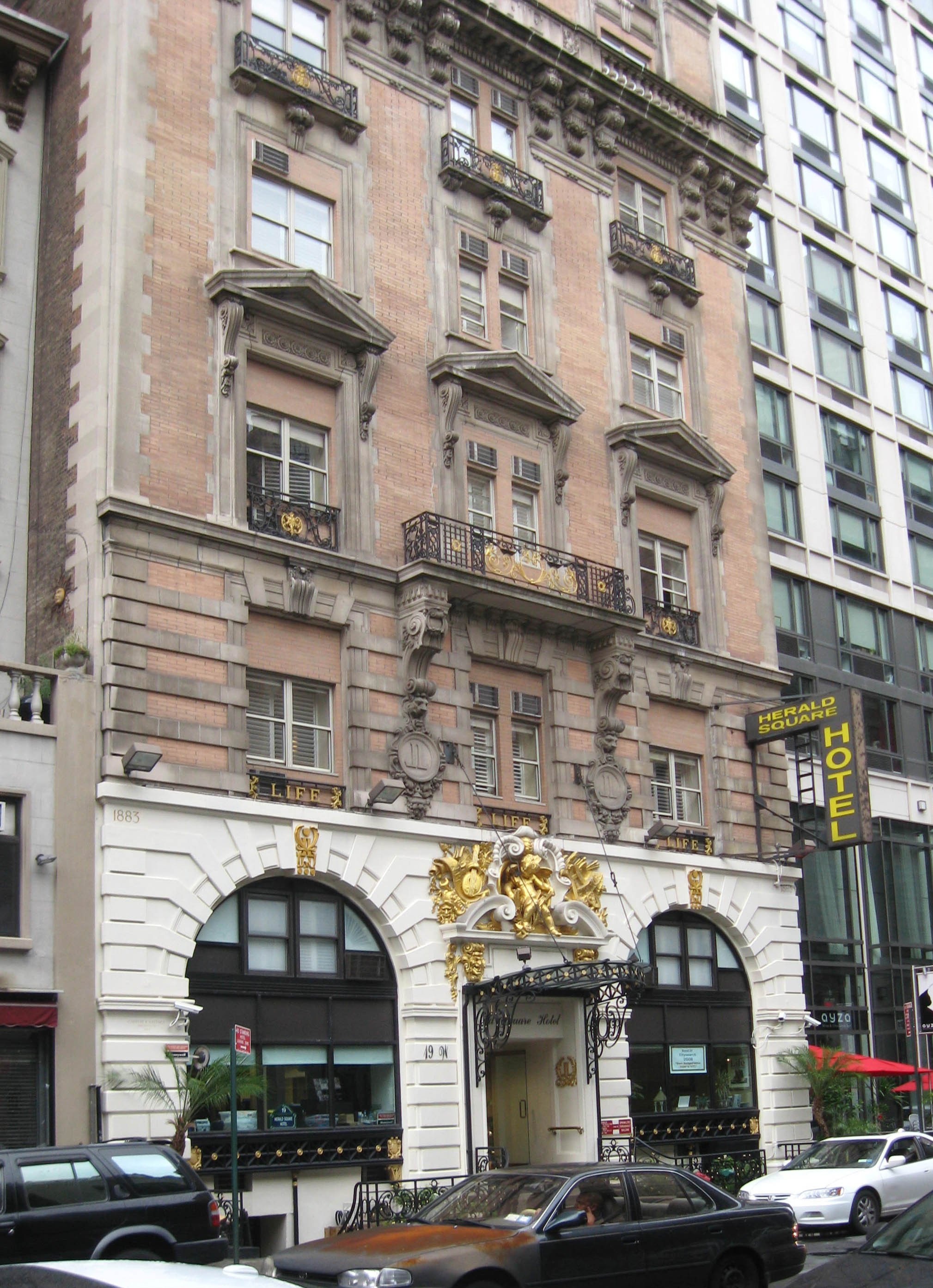
19 West 31st Street

Cover of the issue from March 25, 1966, with the feature story on LSD

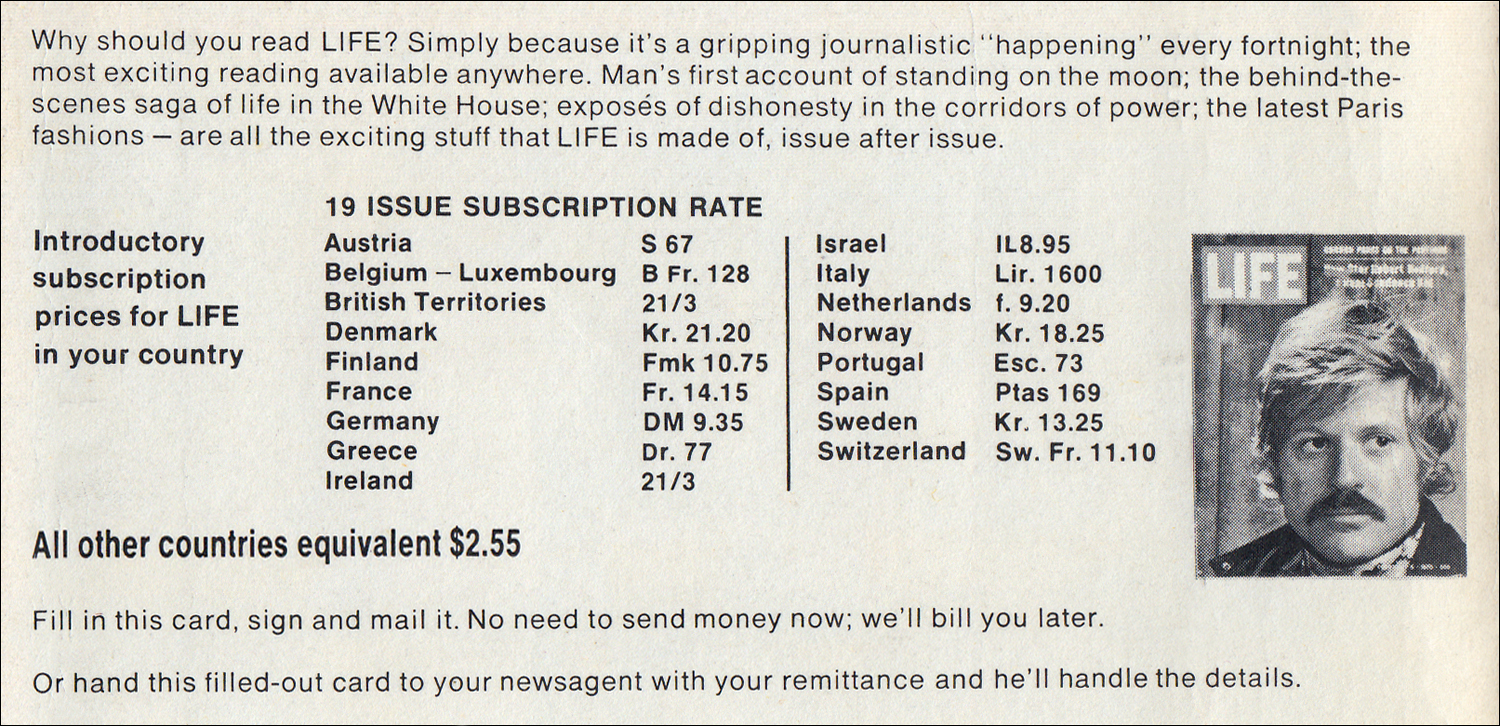
A subscription offer from Life in 1970. The U.S. price was then $2.55 for 19 issues.

In 1936, publisher Henry Luce purchased a humor magazine called Life for US$92,000 ($2.13 million in 2025) because he wanted the name for his company, Time Inc., to use. Time Inc. sold Life's subscription list and features to another humor magazine, Judge. Convinced that pictures could tell a story instead of just illustrating text, Luce launched the new Life on November 23, 1936, with John Shaw Billings and Daniel Longwell as founding editors. The third magazine published by Luce, after Time in 1923 and Fortune in 1930, Life developed as the definitive photo magazine in the U.S., giving as much space and importance to images as to words. The first issue of this version of Life, which sold for ten cents (worth $2.32 in 2025), had five pages of Alfred Eisenstaedt's photographs.

In planning the weekly news magazine, Luce circulated a confidential prospectus within Time Inc. in 1936, which described his vision for the new Life magazine, and what he viewed as its unique purpose. Life magazine was to be the first publication with a focus on photographs that enabled the American public:

To see life; to see the world; to eyewitness great events; to watch the faces of the poor and the gestures of the proud; to see strange things—machines, armies, multitudes, shadows in the jungle and on the moon; to see man's work—his paintings, towers and discoveries; to see things thousands of miles away, things hidden behind walls and within rooms, things dangerous to come to; the women that men love and many children; to see and take pleasure in seeing; to see and be amazed; to see and be instructed...

—Prospectus for a New Magazine

Luce's first issue cover depicted the Fort Peck Dam in Montana, a Works Progress Administration project, photographed by Margaret Bourke-White.

The format of Life in 1936 was a success: the text was condensed into captions for 50 pages of photographs. The magazine was printed on heavily coated paper and cost readers only a dime ($2.32 in 2025). The magazine's circulation was beyond the company's predictions, going from 380,000 copies of the first issue to more than one million a week four months later. It soon challenged The Saturday Evening Post, then the largest-circulation weekly in the country. The magazine's success stimulated many imitators, such as Look, which was founded a year later in 1937 and ran until 1971.

Luce moved Life into its own building at 19 West 31st Street, a Beaux-Arts building constructed in 1894. Later Life moved its editorial offices to 9 Rockefeller Plaza.

A co-founder of the new Life magazine, Longwell served as managing editor from 1944 to 1946, and as chairman of the board of editors until his retirement in 1954. He was credited for publishing Winston Churchill's The Second World War and Ernest Hemingway's The Old Man and the Sea.

Luce also selected Edward Kramer Thompson, a stringer for Time, as assistant picture editor in 1937. From 1949 to 1961, Thompson was the managing editor, and served as editor-in-chief for nearly a decade until his retirement in 1970. His influence was significant during the magazine's heyday, which was roughly from 1936 until the mid-1960s. Thompson was known for the free rein he gave his editors, particularly a "trio of formidable and colorful women: Sally Kirkland, fashion editor; Mary Letherbee, movie editor; and Mary Hamman, modern living editor."

When the U.S. entered World War II in 1941, Life covered the war closely. By 1944, seven of the 40 Time and Life war correspondents were women: Americans Mary Welsh Hemingway, Margaret Bourke-White, Lael Tucker, Peggy Durdin, Shelley Smith Mydans, and Annalee Jacoby, as well as Englishwoman Jacqueline Saix (Saix's name is often omitted from the list, but she and Welsh were the only women listed as part of the magazine's team in a Times's publisher's letter from May 8, 1944).

Life backed the war effort each week. In July 1942, it launched its first art contest for soldiers, which drew more than 1,500 entries submitted by all ranks. Judges sorted out the best and awarded $1,000 in prizes. Life picked 16 for reproduction in the magazine. The National Gallery in Washington, D.C. agreed to put 117 entries on exhibition that summer. Life, also supported the military's efforts to use artists to document the war. When Congress forbade the armed forces from using government money to fund artists in the field, Life privatized the programs, hiring many of the artists being let go by the Department of War (which would later become the Department of Defense). On December 7, 1960, Life managers donated many of the works by such artists to the Department of War and its art programs, such as the United States Army Art Program.

Each week during World War II, the magazine brought photographs of the war to Americans, with photographers from all theaters of war. The magazine was imitated in enemy propaganda using contrasting images of Life and Death.

In August 1942, writing about labor and racial unrest in Detroit, Life warned that "the morale situation is perhaps the worst in the U.S. ... It is time for the rest of the country to sit up and take notice. For Detroit can either blow up Hitler or it can blow up the U.S." Mayor Edward Jeffries was outraged: "I'll match Detroit's patriotism against any other city's in the country. The whole story in Life is scurrilous ... I'd just call it a yellow magazine and let it go at that." The article was considered so dangerous to the war effort that it was censored from copies of the magazine sold outside North America.

In July 1943, the magazine hired war photographer Robert Capa to cover the Sicilian and Italian campaigns. A veteran of Collier's magazine, Capa accompanied the first wave of the D-Day invasion in Normandy, France, on June 6, 1944, and returned with only a handful of images, many of them out of focus. The magazine wrote in the captions that the photos were fuzzy because Capa's hands were shaking. Capa denied this and claimed that the darkroom had ruined his negatives. Later he poked fun at Life by titling his war memoir Slightly Out of Focus (1947). In 1954, Capa was killed after stepping on a landmine while covering the First Indochina War. Life photographer Bob Landry also went in with the first wave at D-Day, "but all of Landry's film was lost, and his shoes to boot."

A notable mistake appeared in Life's 1 November 1948 issue, the day before the U.S. presidential election, when the magazine printed a full-page photograph showing candidate Thomas E. Dewey and his wife riding across the harbor of San Francisco, California with the caption "The next President travels by ferry boat over the broad waters of San Francisco Bay." Incumbent President Harry S. Truman won the election; Dewey was expected to win the election, and the Chicago Tribune made a similar mistake with the erroneous headline "Dewey Defeats Truman".

On May 10, 1950, the council of ministers in Cairo banned Life from Egypt forever. All issues on sale were confiscated. No reason was given, but Egyptian officials expressed indignation over the magazine's April 10 story about King Farouk of Egypt, entitled the "Problem King of Egypt". The government considered it insulting to the country.

In the 1950s, Life earned a measure of respect by commissioning work from top authors. After its publication of Ernest Hemingway's The Old Man and the Sea in 1952, the magazine contracted with the author for a 4,000-word piece on bullfighting. Hemingway sent the editors a 10,000-word article, following his last visit to Spain to cover a series of contests between two top matadors in 1959. The article was republished in 1985 as the novella The Dangerous Summer.

In February 1953, just a few weeks after leaving office, President Harry S. Truman announced that Life magazine would handle all rights to his memoirs. Truman said it was his belief that by 1954 he would be able to speak more fully on subjects pertaining to the role his administration played in world affairs. Truman observed that Life editors had presented other memoirs with great dignity; he added that Life had also made the best offer.

Beginning in 1953, a Spanish-language edition was published, titled Life en español. It had a circulation of over 300,000 in Latin America.

For his 1955 Museum of Modern Art traveling exhibition The Family of Man, which was to be seen by nine million visitors worldwide, curator Edward Steichen relied heavily on photographs from Life: 111 of the 503 pictures shown, constituting more than 20% as counted by Abigail Solomon-Godeau. His assistant Wayne Miller entered the magazine's archive in late 1953, and spent an estimated nine months there. He searched through 3.5 million images, most in the form of original negatives (only in the last years of the war did the picture department start to print contact sheets of all assignments), and submitted many that had not been published in the magazine to Steichen for selection.

In November 1954, actress Dorothy Dandridge became the first African-American woman to be featured on the cover of the magazine.

In 1957, R. Gordon Wasson, a vice president at J. P. Morgan, published an article in Life extolling the virtues of magic mushrooms. This prompted Albert Hofmann to isolate psilocybin in 1958 for distribution by Sandoz alongside LSD in the U.S., further raising interest in LSD in the mass media. Following Wasson's report, Timothy Leary visited Mexico to try out the mushrooms, which were used in traditional religious rituals.

Life's motto became "To see Life; to see the world." The magazine produced many popular science serials, such as The World We Live In and The Epic of Man in the early 1950s. The magazine continued to showcase the work of notable illustrators such as Alton S. Tobey, whose contributions included the cover for a 1958 series of articles on the history of the Russian Revolution.

As the 1950s drew to a close and television became more popular, the magazine was losing readers. In May 1959, Life announced plans to reduce its regular news-stand price from 25 cents a copy to 20. With the increase in television sales and viewership, interest in news magazines was waning, and Life had to try to create a new form.

In the 1960s, the magazine was filled with color photos of movie stars, President John F. Kennedy and his family, the war in Vietnam, and the Apollo program. Typical of the magazine's editorial focus was a long 1964 feature on actress Elizabeth Taylor and her relationship with actor Richard Burton. Journalist Richard Meryman traveled with Taylor to New York, California, and Paris. Life ran a 6,000-word first-person article on the screen star.

"I'm not a 'sex queen' or a 'sex symbol,'" Taylor said. "I don't think I want to be one. Sex symbol kind of suggests bathrooms in hotels or something. I do know I'm a movie star and I like being a woman, and I think sex is absolutely gorgeous. But as far as a sex goddess, I don't worry myself that way... Richard is a very sexy man. He's got that sort of jungle essence that one can sense... When we look at each other, it's like our eyes have fingers and they grab ahold.... I think I ended up being the scarlet woman because of my rather puritanical upbringing and beliefs. I couldn't just have a romance. It had to be a marriage."

In the 1960s, the magazine printed photographs by Gordon Parks. "The camera is my weapon against the things I dislike about the universe and how I show the beautiful things about the universe," Parks recalled in 2000. "I didn't care about Life magazine. I cared about the people," he said.

Paul Welch's Life article "Homosexuality in America", published in June 1964, marked the first time a national mainstream publication reported on gay issues. Life's photographer was referred to the gay leather bar in San Francisco called the Tool Box for the article by Hal Call, who had long worked to dispel the myth that all gay men were effeminate. The article opened with a two-page spread of the mural of life-size leathermen in the bar, painted by Chuck Arnett in 1962. The article described San Francisco as "The Gay Capital of America", and inspired many gay leathermen to move there.

On March 25, 1966, Life featured a cover story on the drug LSD. The drug had attracted attention among the counterculture and was not yet criminalized.

In March 1967, Life won the 1967 National Magazine Award, chosen by the Columbia University Graduate School of Journalism. Despite the industry's accolades and its coverage of the U.S. mission to the Moon in 1969, the magazine continued to lose circulation. In January 1971, Time Inc. announced its decision to reduce the magazine's circulation from 8.5 million to 7 million in an effort to offset shrinking advertising revenues. The following year, Life cut its circulation further to 5.5 million beginning with the issue from January 14, 1972. The magazine was reportedly not losing money, but its costs were rising faster than its profits. Life lost credibility with many readers when it supported author Clifford Irving, whose fraudulent autobiography of Howard Hughes was revealed as a hoax in January 1972. The magazine had purchased serialization rights to Irving's manuscript.

Industry figures showed that some 96% of Life's circulation went to mail subscribers, with only 4% coming from the more profitable newsstand sales. Gary Valk was publisher when, on December 8, 1972, the magazine announced it would cease publication by the end of the year and lay off hundreds of staff. The weekly Life magazine published its last issue on December 29, 1972.

From 1972 to 1978, Time Inc. published ten Life Special Reports on such themes as "The Spirit of Israel", "Remarkable American Women" and "The Year in Pictures". With a minimum of promotion, these issues sold between 500,000 and 1 million copies at cover prices of up to $2.

Beginning in October 1978, Life was published as a monthly publication with a new logo; although it remained a familiar red rectangle with the white type, the new version was larger, the lettering was closer together and the box surrounding it was smaller.

Life continued for the next 22 years as general-interest, news features magazine. In 1986, it marked its 50th anniversary under the Time Inc. umbrella with a special issue showing every cover since 1936, which included issues published during the six-year hiatus in the 1970s.

The circulation in this era hovered around 1.5 million. The cover price in 1986 was $2.50 (equivalent to $7.34 in 2025). The publisher was Charles Whittingham; the editor was Philip Kunhardt.

In 1991, Life sent correspondents to the first Gulf War and published special issues of coverage. Four issues of this weekly, Life in Time of War, were published during the war.

Life's online presence began in the 1990s as part of the Pathfinder.com network. The standalone Life.com site was launched on March 31, 2009, and closed on January 30, 2012. Life.com was developed by Andrew Blau and Bill Shapiro, the same team who launched the weekly newspaper supplement. While the archive of Life, known as the Life Picture Collection, was substantial, they searched for a partner who could provide significant contemporary photography. They approached Getty Images, the world's largest licensor of photography. The site offered millions of photographs from Life and Getty Images' combined collections. On the 50th anniversary of the night Marilyn Monroe sang "Happy Birthday" to John F. Kennedy, Life.com presented Bill Ray's iconic portrait of the actress, along with other rare photos.

Life.com later became a redirect to a small photo channel on Time.com. Life.com also maintains Tumblr and Twitter accounts and a presence on Instagram.

The magazine struggled financially and, in February 1993, Life announced the magazine would be printed in a smaller format starting with its July issue, which reintroduced the original Life logo.

Life reduced advertising prices by 34% in a bid to attract more advertisers. In July 1993, the magazine reduced its circulation guarantee for advertisers by 12%, from 1.7 million to 1.5 million copies. The publishers in this era were Nora McAniff and Edward McCarrick, and Daniel Okrent was the editor. Life now used the smaller size used by its longtime Time Inc. sister publication, Fortune.

In 1999, the magazine, despite its financial troubles, still made news by compiling lists to round out the 20th century. Life editors ranked their "Most Important Events of the Millennium" and a list of the "100 Most Important People of the Millennium"; however, this list was criticized for focusing on the West. Thomas Edison's number one ranking was challenged since critics believed that other inventions, such as the internal combustion engine, the automobile, and electricity-making machines, had greater effects on society than Edison's. The top 100 list was also criticized for mixing world-famous names, such as Isaac Newton, Albert Einstein, Louis Pasteur, and Leonardo da Vinci, with figures largely unknown outside of the United States (18 Americans compared to 13 Italian and French, and 11 English).

=== 21st century ===
In March 2000, Time Inc. announced it would cease regular publication of Life with the May issue.

"It's a sad day for us here," Don Logan, chairman and chief executive of Time Inc., told CNN.com. "It was still in the black," he said, noting that Life was increasingly spending more to maintain its monthly circulation level of approximately 1.5 million. "Life was a general interest magazine and since its reincarnation, it had always struggled to find its identity, to find its position in the marketplace."

The magazine's last issue featured a human interest story. Its first issue under Henry Luce in 1936 featured a baby named George Story, with the headline "Life Begins"; the magazine had published updates about the course of Story's life over the years, as he married, had children, and pursued a career as a journalist. After Time announced its pending closure in March, Story happened to die of heart failure on April 4, 2000. The last issue of Life was titled "A Life Ends", featuring his story and how it had intertwined with the magazine's history.

For Life subscribers, remaining subscriptions were honored with other Time Inc. magazines, such as Time. In January 2001, these subscribers received a special Life-sized format of "The Year in Pictures" edition of Time magazine; it was a Life issue disguised under a Time logo on the front. Newsstand copies of this edition were published under the Life imprint.

While citing poor advertising sales and a difficult climate for selling magazine subscriptions, Time Inc. executives said a key reason for closing Life magazine was to divert resources to the company's other magazine launches that year, such as Real Simple. Later that year, its owner, Time Warner, struck a deal with the Tribune Company for Times Mirror magazines, which included Golf, Ski, Skiing, Field & Stream and Yachting. AOL and Time Warner announced a $184 billion merger, the largest corporate merger in history, which was finalized in January 2001.

In 2001, Time Warner began publishing special newsstand "megazine" issues of Life on topics such as the September 11 attacks and the Holy Land. These issues, which were printed on thicker paper, were more like softcover books than magazines.

Beginning in October 2004, Life was revived for a second time. It resumed weekly publication as a free supplement to U.S. newspapers, competing for the first time with the two industry heavyweights, Parade and USA Weekend. At its launch, it was distributed with more than 60 newspapers with a combined circulation of approximately 12 million. Among the newspapers to carry Life were the Washington Post, New York Daily News, Los Angeles Times, Chicago Tribune, Denver Post, and St. Louis Post-Dispatch. Time Inc. made deals with several major newspaper publishers to carry the Life supplement, including Knight Ridder and the McClatchy Company. The launch of Life as a weekly newspaper supplement was conceived by Andrew Blau, who served as the President of Life. Bill Shapiro was the founding editor of the weekly supplement.

This version of Life retained its trademark logo but sported a new cover motto, "America's Weekend Magazine." It measured 9½ x 11½ inches and was printed on glossy paper in full color. On September 15, 2006, Life was 19 pages of editorial content. The editorial content contained one full-page photo, of actress Julia Louis-Dreyfus, and one three-page, seven-photo essay, of Kaiju Big Battel. On March 24, 2007, Time Inc. announced that it would fold the magazine by April 20, although it would keep the web site.

On November 18, 2008, Google began hosting an archive of the magazine's photographs, as part of a joint effort with Life. Many images in this archive had never been published in the magazine. The archive, consisting of over six million photographs, is also available through Google Cultural Institute, allowing for users to create collections, and is accessible through Google image search. The full archive of the issues of the main run (1936–1972) is available through Google Book Search.

In September 2008, Time Inc. and Getty Images announced LIFE.com, a website jointly owned and operated by the two companies, with Andy Blau of Time Inc. as chief executive and Catherine Gluckstein of Getty Images as chief financial officer. The site launched on March 31, 2009, under founding editor Bill Shapiro, combining the LIFE archive with current and archival Getty Images photography and adding roughly 3,000 new photographs daily; Ellen DeGeneres served as its first celebrity curator. In April 2009, LIFE.com published the first new cover featuring Miley Cyrus, photographed by editor at large Jeff Vespa over four days around the release of Hannah Montana: The Movie and the Kids' Choice Awards. On December 16, 2009, LIFE.com released a special edition of LIFE for James Cameron's Avatar, with four collectible covers shot by Vespa featuring Cameron, Zoe Saldana, Sam Worthington and Sigourney Weaver. On January 30, 2012, the partnership ended and the LIFE.com address became a photo channel on Time.com.

Special editions of Life are published on notable occasions, such as a Bob Dylan edition on the occasion of his winning the Nobel Prize in Literature in 2016, Paul at 75 when Paul McCartney turned 75 in 2017, and "Life" Explores: The Roaring '20s in 2020.

Life is currently owned by Dotdash Meredith, which owns most former Time Inc. and Meredith Corporation assets.

In 2024, LIFE. Hollywood, a two-volume 2024 photo book collection from Life magazine was published by Taschen and captured Hollywood's Golden Age from 1936 to 1972.

=== Revival ===
In 2024, it was announced that Bedford Media (owned by Karlie Kloss and Joshua Kushner) would be reviving the magazine in an agreement with Dotdash Meredith (now People Inc.). Bedford Media owns i-D magazine and Kloss partially owns W Media.

The magazine is scheduled to relaunch in November 2026. Hugo Lindgren will serve as editor and Richard Turley as creative director.

== Contributors ==
Notable contributors have included:

- Edward K. Thompson, managing editor (1949–1961) and editor (1961–1970)

Photojournalists:

- Harry Benson
- Berry Berenson
- Walter Bosshard
- Margaret Bourke-White
- Brian Brake
- Larry Burrows
- David Burnett
- David Douglas Duncan
- Robert Capa
- Henri Cartier-Bresson
- Loomis Dean
- John Dominis
- Alfred Eisenstaedt
- Eliot Elisofon
- Bill Eppridge
- Andreas Feininger
- Ron Galella
- Alfred Gescheidt
- Bob Gomel
- Allan Grant
- Dirck Halstead
- Marie Hansen
- Bernard Hoffman
- Henri Huet
- Isaac Kitrosser
- Peter B. Martin
- Hansel Mieth
- Lee Miller
- Gjon Mili
- John G. Morris
- Ralph Morse
- Carl Mydans
- Gordon Parks
- John Phillips
- Bill Ray
- Co Rentmeester
- David E. Scherman
- Paul Schutzer
- Art Shay
- George Silk
- George Strock
- W. Eugene Smith
- Peter Stackpole
- Pete Souza
- John Vachon
- Jeff Vespa, editor
- Leigh Wiener
- Tony Zappone, Europe edition
- John G. Zimmerman

Film critics:

- Brad Darrach
- Wheeler Winston Dixon

Fashion:

- Howell Conant, fashion photographer
- Clay Felker, sportswriter, founder of New York magazine
- Sally Kirkland, editor, fashion

Photographers:

- John Florea
- Henry Grossman
- Philippe Halsman
- Dorothea Lange
- Nina Leen
- Mark Shaw
- Edward Steichen, portraits
- André Weinfeld, portraits

Illustrators:

- Mary Hamman, modern living editor
- Richard Edes Harrison, cartographer
- Jane Howard, journalist and correspondent
- Will Lang Jr. (bureau chief)
- Henry Luce, publisher and editor-in-chief
- Gerald Moore, reporter

Writers:

- Normand Poirier
- Ronald B. Scott
- Thomas Thompson, writer and editor

== See also ==
- List of defunct American periodicals
