= Peter Martyn =

Peter Martyn may refer to:

- Peter Martyn (soldier) (1772–1827), Irish soldier
- Peter Martyn (actor) (1925–1955), British actor
- Peter Martyn (judge), Irish barrister, landowner and judge
- Peter Martyn (MP), Member of Parliament (MP) for Helston
- Peter H. Martyn (born 1948), Canadian journalist

== See also ==
- Peter Martin (disambiguation)
