= Carefree sundial =

Sundial in Carefree, Arizona, US

Carefree Sundial
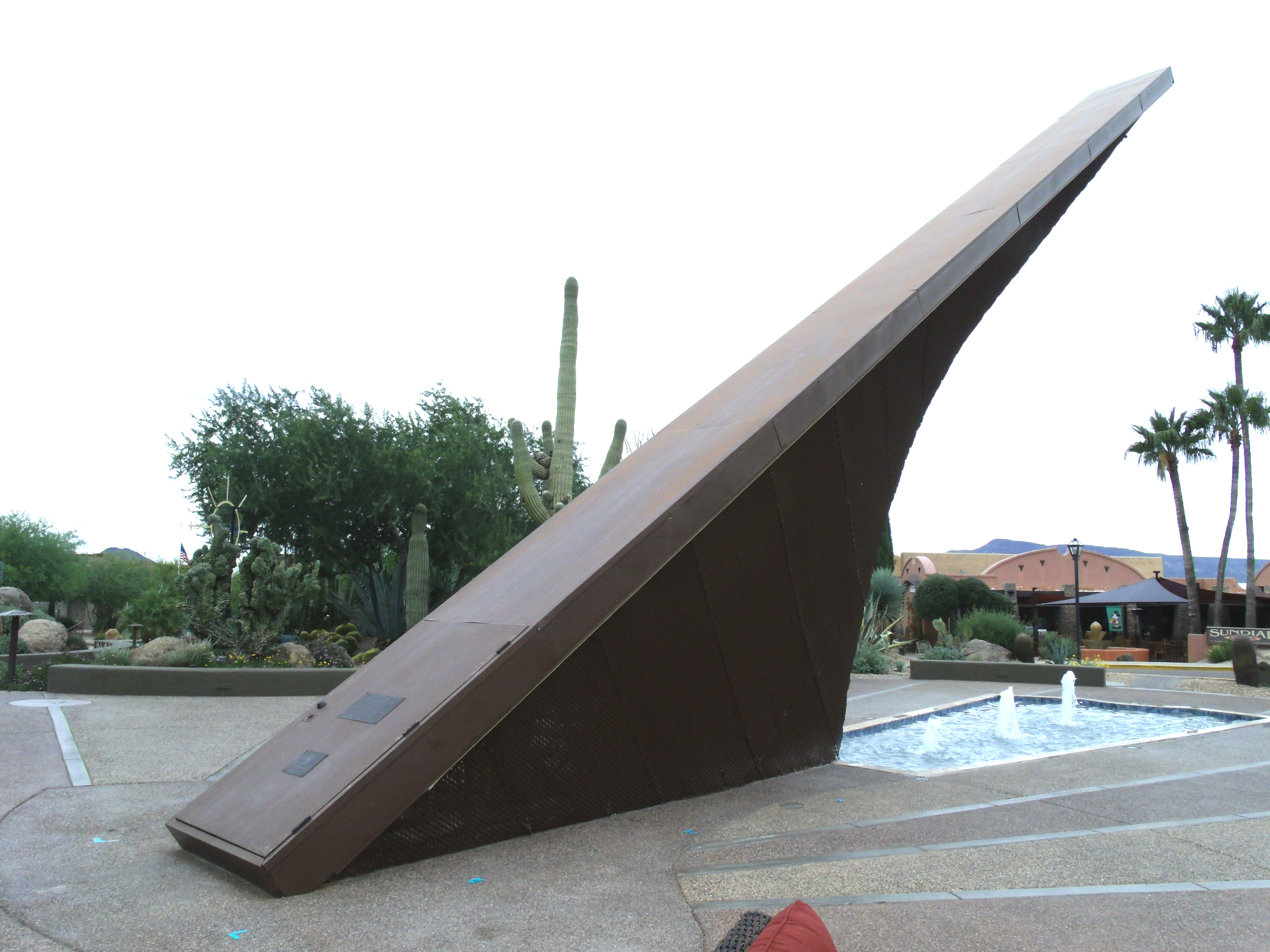
- Possibly once the largest sundial in the United States
- Interactive map of Carefree Sundial
- Location: Sundial Circle Plaza, Carefree, Arizona.
- Coordinates: 33.8242°N 111.9220°W
- Designer: Solar Engineer John I. Yellot and Architect Joe Wong
- Material: Copper-clad
- Length: 62 feet (19 m); 90 feet (27 m) in diameter
- Completion date: 1959
- Dedicated to: K. T. Palmer

The Carefree Sundial, in Carefree, Arizona, was designed by architect Joe Wong and solar engineer John I. Yellott (1908–1986), was erected in the Sundial Circle plaza in 1959. The sundial is made from a steel frame and covered in anodized copper. As originally designed the 1200mm wide gnomon acted as a heat collecting plate for a local heating scheme. It measures 90 feet (27 m) in diameter. The metal gnomon, the shadow-casting portion of the dial, stands 35 feet (11 m) above the plaza and extends 62 feet (19 m). Local apparent time is 27.7 minutes behind the meridian time which here is Mountain Standard Time. The hour markers are adjusted accordingly.

== Description ==
The Carefree sundial was conceived and constructed by John Yellott of Phoenix, Arizona, the architect was Joe Wong. The dial's gnomon is 4 feet (1.2 m) wide and 62 feet (19 m) feet long, rising 35 feet (11 m) above Solar Plaza. It is encircled by cacti and stones surrounding a reflecting pool with golden lines and concrete numbers to mark the time. Once it was visible from 3 kilometres (1.9 mi) but a shopping-centre has developed around it, obscuring the view. The hour-lines are offset to account for plaza's longitude, 6° 35' 36" west of the Mountain Standard Time meridian, 105° west. The gnomon served an ancillary purpose – designed to absorb solar energy which was converted into heat by three copper tubes, which pumped the heated water into a local heating system for a neighbouring office block. To facilitate the absorption the top 52 feet (16 m) of the gnomon's length is coated with a special paint. A smaller 1/48 scale model is on site along with an equation of time table.

== Disputed claims ==
Various communities have made "the largest sundial in" claims. In 1913 the sundial in Ingleside Terraces, San Francisco was claimed to be the largest in the world, (Note: The dial has quite a history, it was built as a marketing device for a residential estate on the former motor-racing circuit. It was popular with local children who dared each other to run to the top, and slide down forwards.) ignoring the existence of the dials at Jaipur. It had a dial diameter of 35 feet (11 m). There is even a larger one (78 feet (24 m)) at Hunters Point in San Francisco. The Carefree claim is disputed by Sun City, Arizona, who have repaired their competing dial which is built from a 64 feet (20 m) steel I-bar.

== Gallery ==
Carefree Sundial
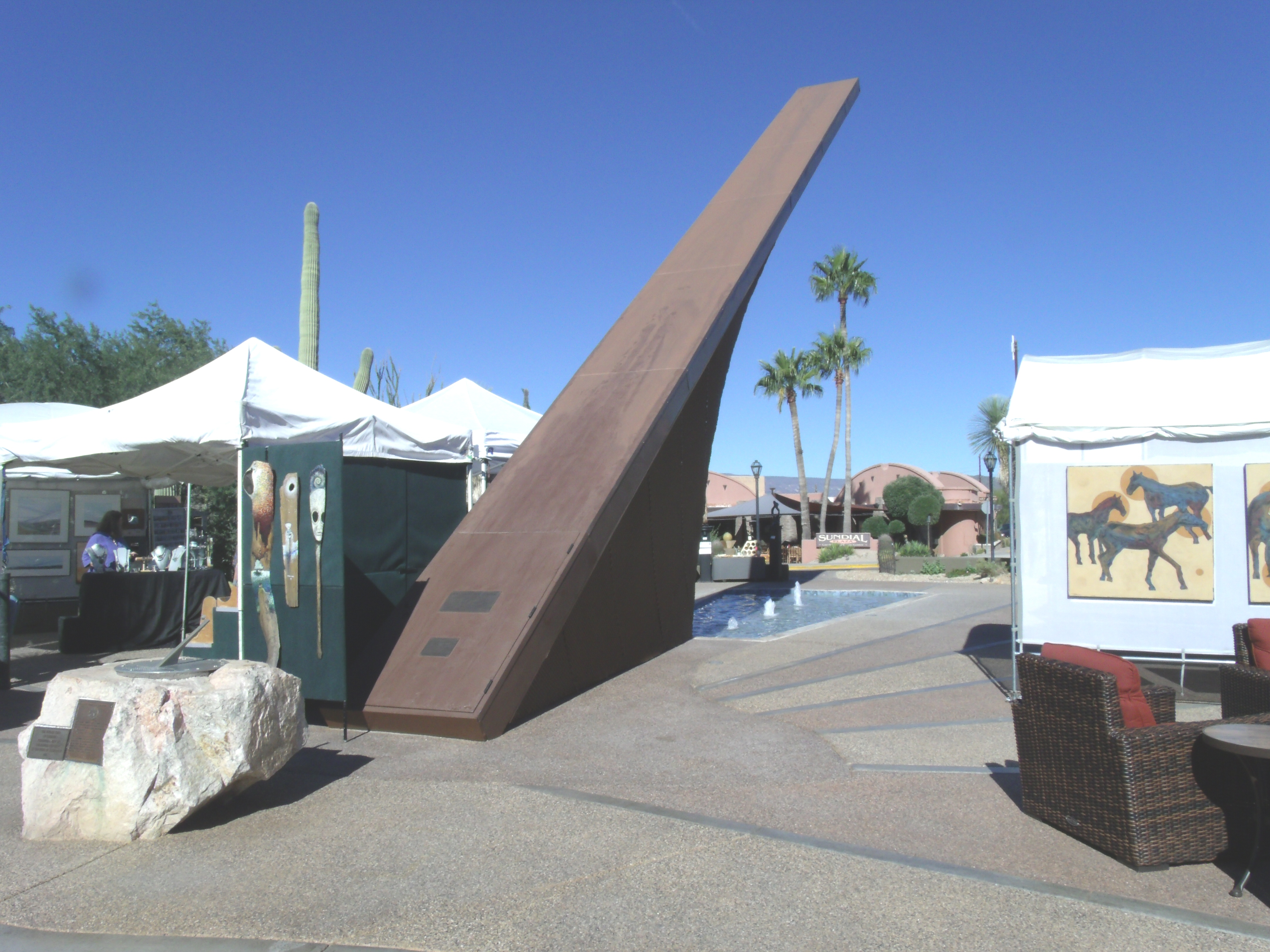
The Carefree Sundial during a town activity

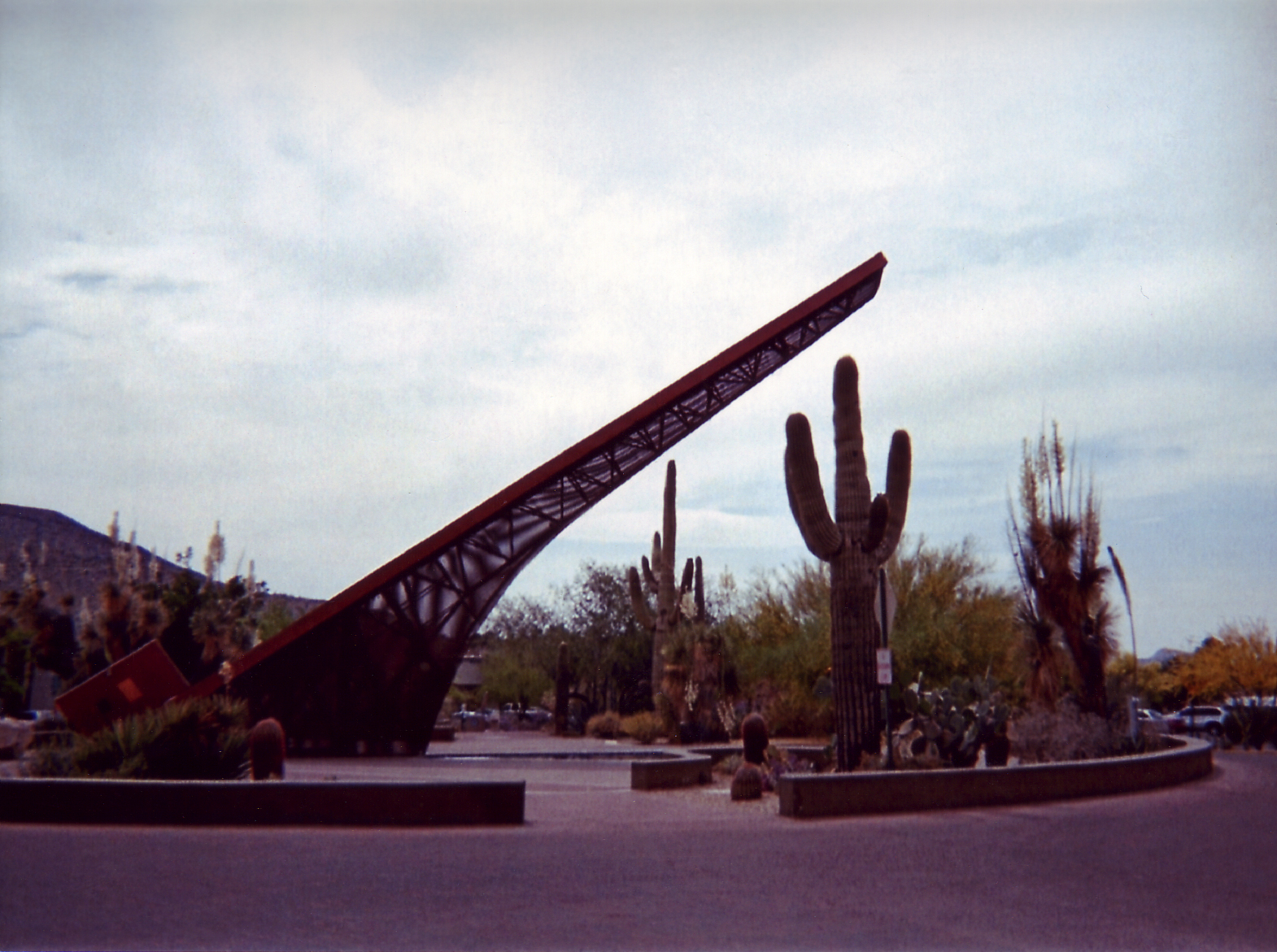
Carefree Sundial at 2 P.M. in early May

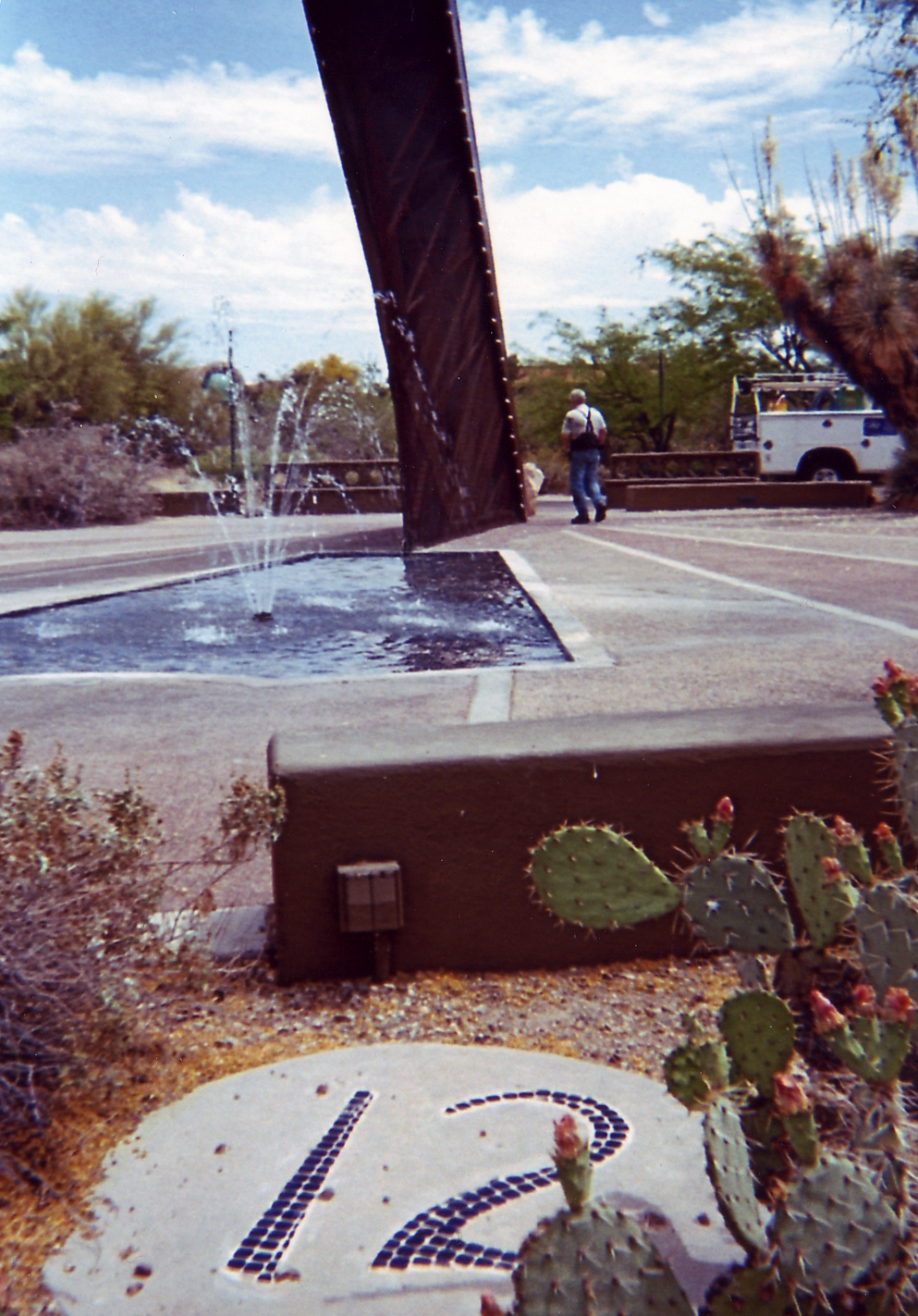
Detail of the 12 o'clock marker with fountain repairman

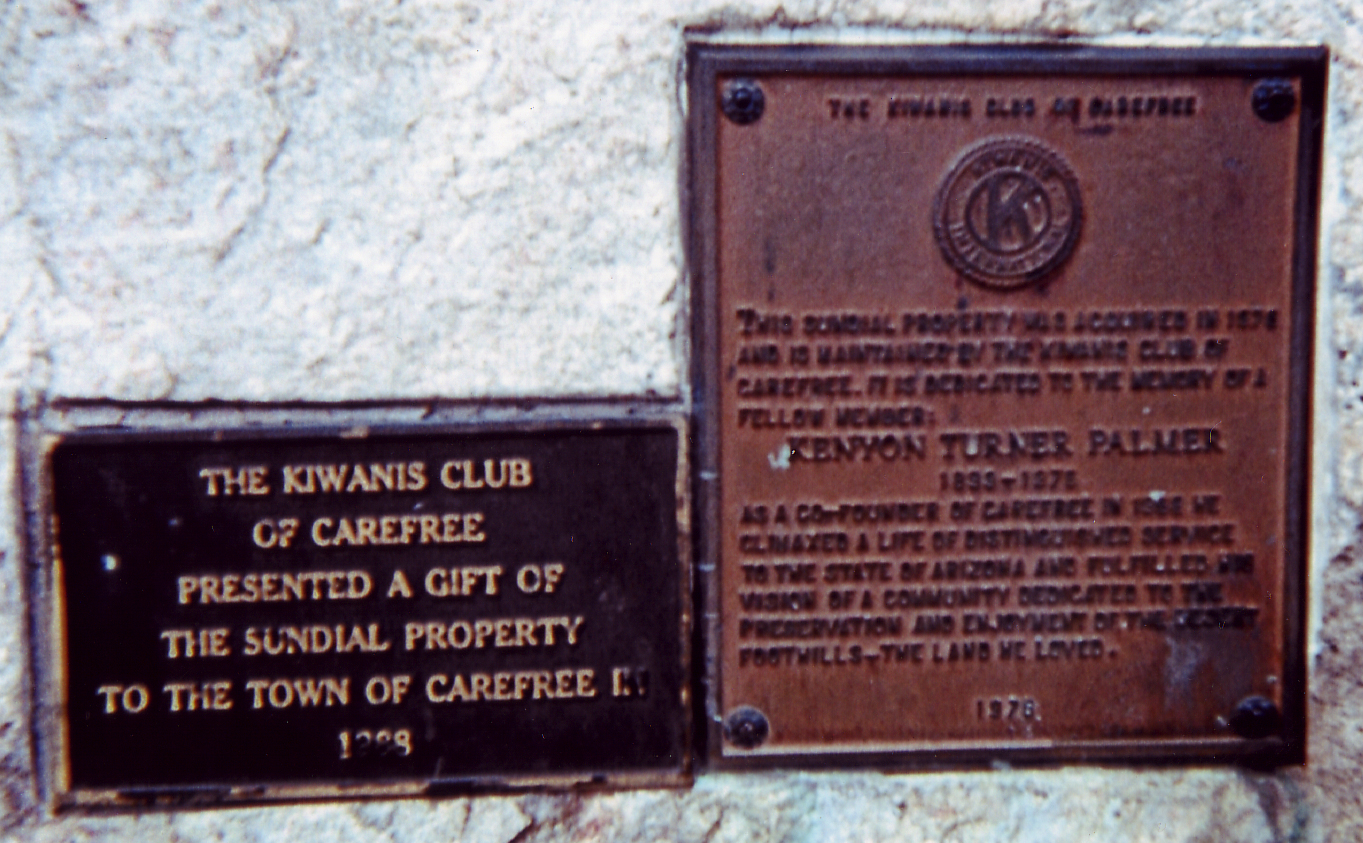
Kiwanis sign

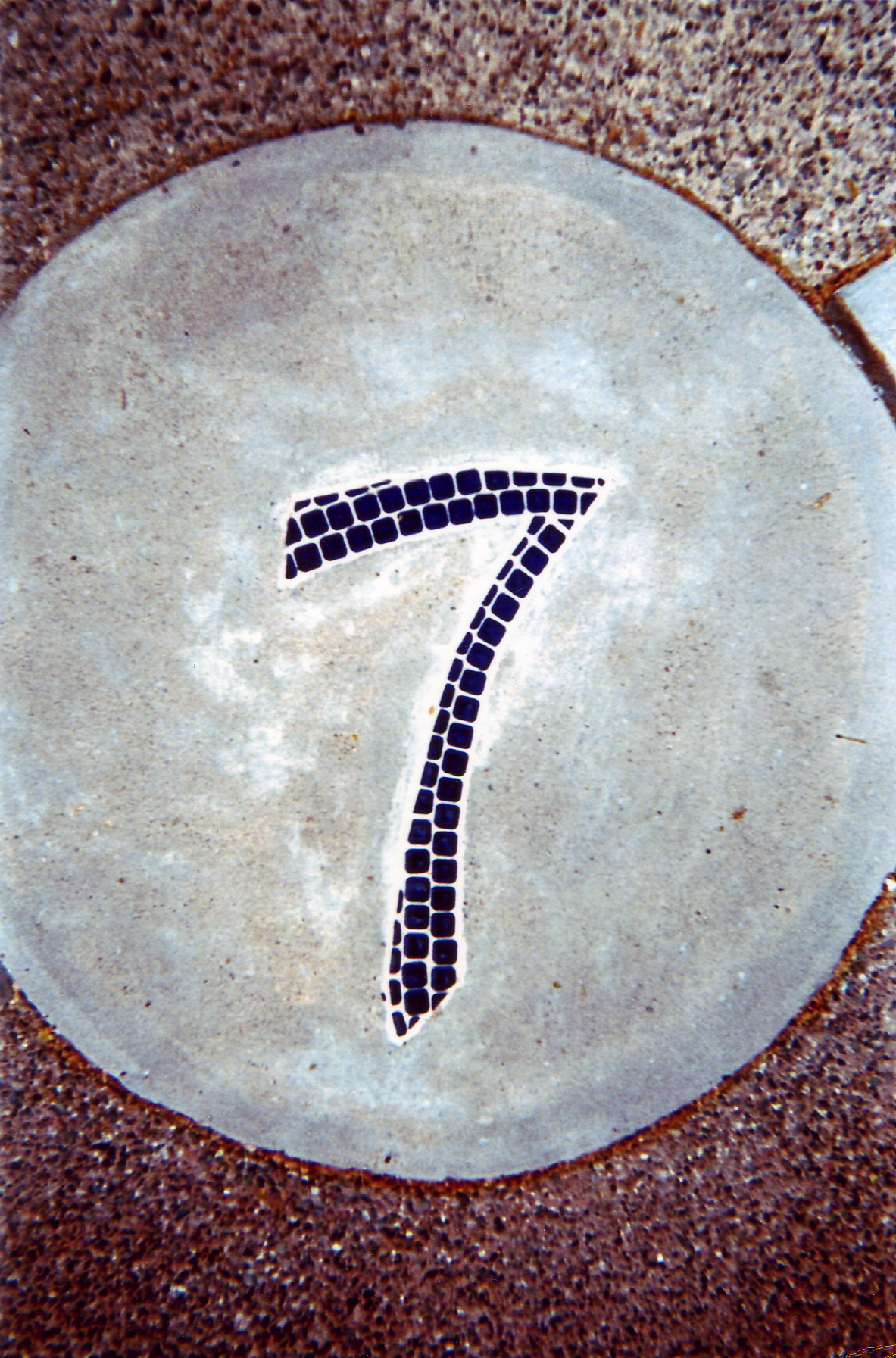
Detail of the 7 o'clock marker
