= Carefree, Arizona =

Town in Maricopa County, Arizona

- Town
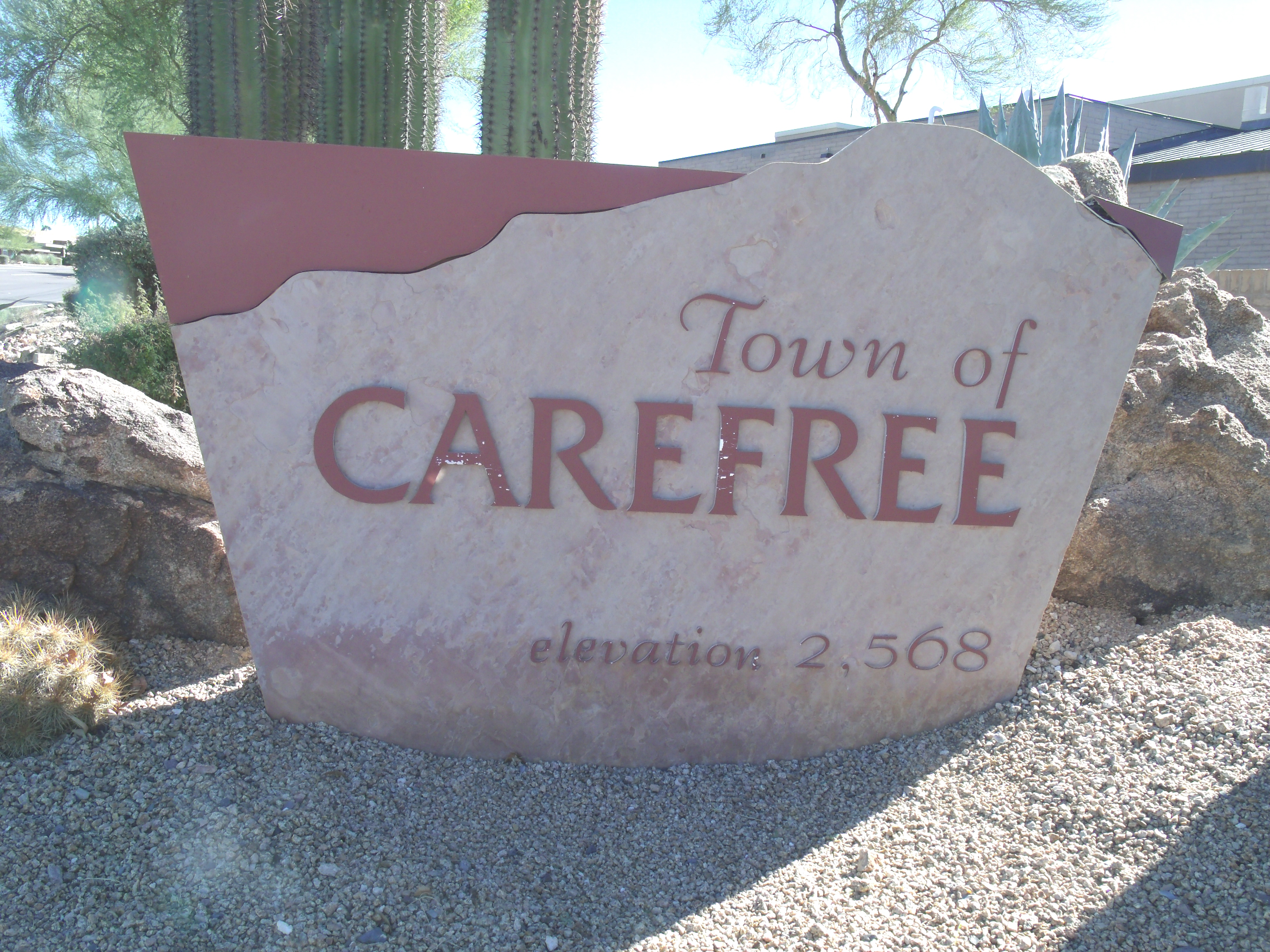
- Welcome marker

- Seal

- Location in Maricopa County, Arizona

- Location within Arizona Location within the United States
- Coordinates: 33°49′24″N 111°54′58″W
- Country: United States
- State: Arizona
- County: Maricopa

Government
  - Mayor: John Crane

Area
  - Total: 8.81 sq mi (22.83 km^{2})
  - Land: 8.81 sq mi (22.82 km^{2})
  - Water: 0.0039 sq mi (0.01 km^{2})
- Elevation: 2,402 ft (732 m)

Population (2020)
  - Total: 3,690
  - Density: 418.9/sq mi (161.73/km^{2})
- Time zone: UTC−7 (MST (no DST))
- ZIP code: 85377
- Area code: 480
- FIPS code: 04-10180
- GNIS feature ID: 2413168
- Website: www.carefree.org

Carefree is a town in Maricopa County, Arizona, United States. It is located north of both Phoenix and Scottsdale in the far northeast area of the Phoenix metropolitan area. As of the 2020 United States census, the population of the town was 3,690.

== History ==
Characterized as an upscale residential area, Carefree was conceived in the mid-1950s by business partners K.T. Palmer and Tom Darlington as a master-planned community. Land sales commenced in 1955 and homebuilding started in 1958. Carefree was incorporated in 1984 to avoid annexation by neighboring Scottsdale.

== Demographics ==
Historical population
Census	Pop.	Note	%±
1980	964		—
1990	1,657		71.9%
2000	2,927		76.6%
2010	3,363		14.9%
2020	3,690		9.7%
U.S. Decennial Census

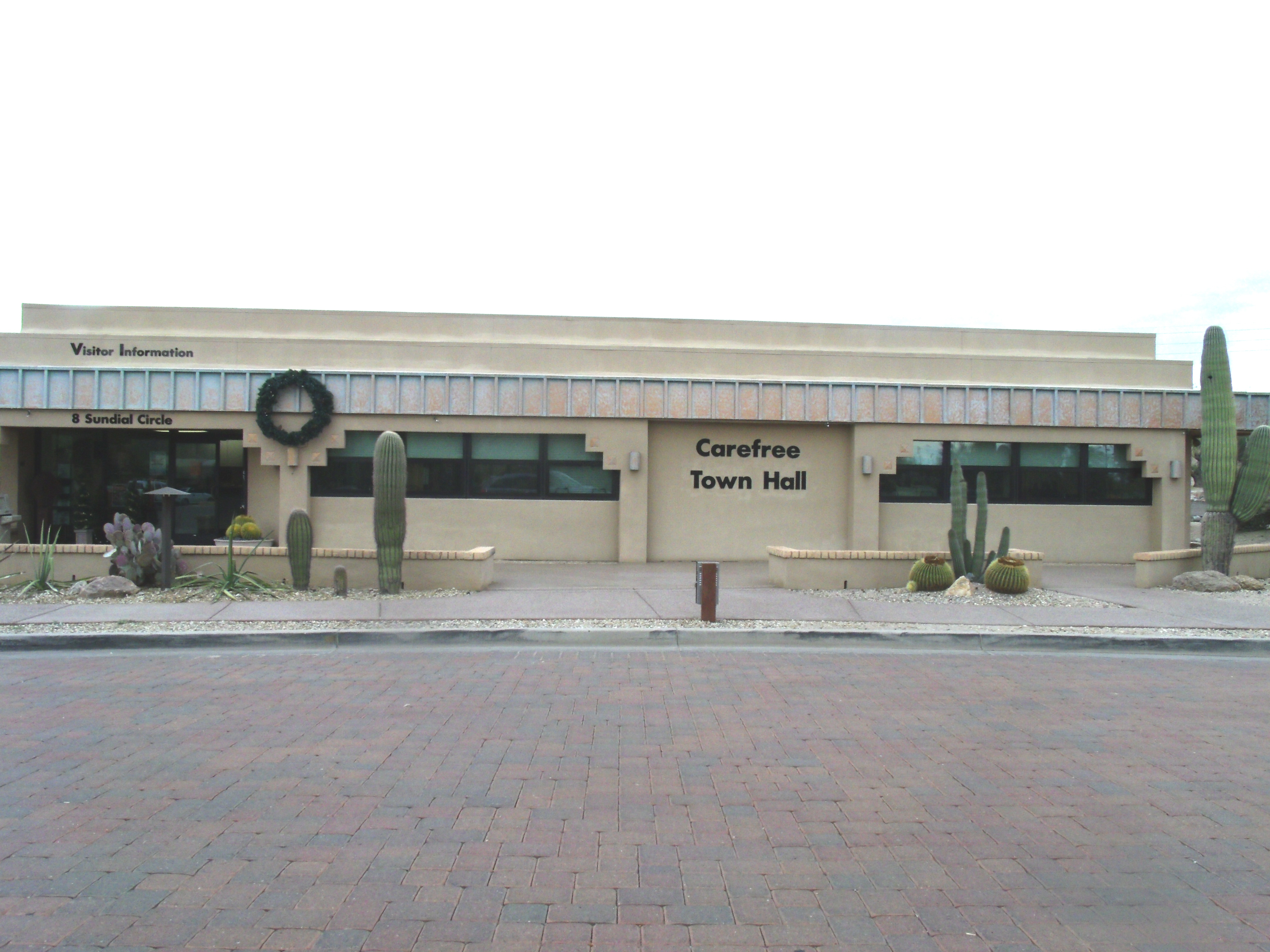
The Carefree Town Hall located at 8 East Sundial Circle

=== 2020 census ===
As of the 2020 census, Carefree had a population of 3,690. The median age was 65.2 years. 6.2% of residents were under the age of 18 and 50.6% of residents were 65 years of age or older. For every 100 females there were 93.6 males, and for every 100 females age 18 and over there were 93.8 males age 18 and over.

95.8% of residents lived in urban areas, while 4.2% lived in rural areas.

There were 1,811 households in Carefree, of which 10.4% had children under the age of 18 living in them. Of all households, 62.3% were married-couple households, 12.5% were households with a male householder and no spouse or partner present, and 20.7% were households with a female householder and no spouse or partner present. About 25.8% of all households were made up of individuals and 17.4% had someone living alone who was 65 years of age or older.

There were 2,536 housing units, of which 28.6% were vacant. The homeowner vacancy rate was 4.2% and the rental vacancy rate was 13.4%.

Racial composition as of the 2020 census
Race	Number	Percent
White	3,408	92.4%
Black or African American	32	0.9%
American Indian and Alaska Native	18	0.5%
Asian	40	1.1%
Native Hawaiian and Other Pacific Islander	3	0.1%
Some other race	30	0.8%
Two or more races	159	4.3%
Hispanic or Latino (of any race)	166	4.5%

=== 2000 census ===
As of the census of 2000, there were 2,927 people, 1,389 households, and 995 families residing in the town. The population density was 330.8 inhabitants per square mile (127.7/km^{2}). There were 1,769 housing units at an average density of 200.0 per square mile (77.2/km^{2}). The racial makeup of the town was 98% White, <1% Black or African American, <1% Native American, <1% Asian, <1% from other races, and 1% from two or more races. Hispanic or Latino of any race were 3% of the population.

There were 1,389 households, out of which 14.3% had children under the age of 18 living with them, 66.5% were married couples, 3.2% had a single owner, and 28.3% were non-families. 23.3% of all households were made up of individuals, and 10.7% had someone living alone who was 65 years of age or older. The average household size was 2.11 and the average family size was 2.44.

In the town, the population was spread out, with 12.7% under the age of 18, 2.0% from 18 to 24, 15.4% from 25 to 44, 40.5% from 45 to 64, and 29.3% who were 65 years of age or older. The median age was 55 years. For every 100 females, there were 98.6 males. For every 100 females age 18 and over, there were 97.2 males.

The median income for a household in the town was $88,702, and the median income for a family was $105,699. Males had a median income of $61,050 versus $38,750 for females. The per capita income for the town was $62,433. About 2.0% of families and 3.2% of the population were below the poverty line, including 1.2% of those under the age of 18 and 3.2% of those 65 and older.

== Geography and climate ==
Carefree lies in northeastern Maricopa County, bordered by the city of Scottsdale to the south and east and by the town of Cave Creek to the west. Carefree and Cave Creek are sometimes thought of as a single community. The two towns share the local landmark Black Mountain, which rises more than 1,000 feet (300 m) above them, to an elevation of 3,398 feet (1,036 m).

According to the United States Census Bureau, the town has a total area of 8.8 square miles (23 km^{2}), of which 0.004 square miles (0.010 km^{2}), or 0.05%, are listed as water.

Carefree has a hot semi-arid climate (Köppen BSh) with hot summers and mild winters, avoiding a designation of arid by being located closer to the rain-catching central mountains of Arizona, so that it receives about 70 percent (around 5.3 inches or 135 millimeters) more rainfall annually than does Phoenix. There are 141 afternoons annually with highs of at least 90 °F or 32.2 °C, 63.4 afternoons of at least 100 °F or 37.8 °C, and three afternoons that exceed 110 °F or 43.3 °C. During the winter, 8.3 mornings will fall below freezing; the coldest temperature reported in Carefree is 15 °F or −9.4 °C, which occurred on January 13, 1963, and January 7, 1971. Snowfall, although infrequent, can occur. The last measurable snow was February 22, 2019, accumulating 3 to 6 inches or 7.6 to 15 centimeters depending upon the elevation.

Rainfall is sometimes heavy during winter fronts or monsoonal storms; the wettest month on record is January 1993 with 9.37 inches (238.0 mm), which helped produce a record "rain year" total of 26.20 inches (665.5 mm) between July 1992 and June 1993; in contrast between July 1962 and June 1963, only 6.98 inches (177.3 mm) was recorded.

Climate data for Carefree, Arizona, 1991–2020 normals, extremes 1961–present
Month	Jan	Feb	Mar	Apr	May	Jun	Jul	Aug	Sep	Oct	Nov	Dec	Year
Record high °F (°C)	84 (29)	86 (30)	97 (36)	102 (39)	109 (43)	118 (48)	118 (48)	114 (46)	111 (44)	107 (42)	92 (33)	82 (28)	118 (48)
Mean maximum °F (°C)	74.5 (23.6)	78.0 (25.6)	85.6 (29.8)	94.0 (34.4)	101.5 (38.6)	108.5 (42.5)	110.6 (43.7)	109.4 (43.0)	105.1 (40.6)	96.5 (35.8)	85.0 (29.4)	74.7 (23.7)	111.8 (44.3)
Mean daily maximum °F (°C)	64.6 (18.1)	67.5 (19.7)	74.1 (23.4)	81.6 (27.6)	91.0 (32.8)	100.6 (38.1)	103.4 (39.7)	102.3 (39.1)	97.0 (36.1)	85.5 (29.7)	73.5 (23.1)	63.6 (17.6)	83.7 (28.7)
Daily mean °F (°C)	53.1 (11.7)	55.6 (13.1)	61.0 (16.1)	67.2 (19.6)	76.1 (24.5)	85.4 (29.7)	89.7 (32.1)	89.1 (31.7)	83.7 (28.7)	72.8 (22.7)	61.5 (16.4)	52.5 (11.4)	70.6 (21.4)
Mean daily minimum °F (°C)	41.6 (5.3)	43.8 (6.6)	47.9 (8.8)	52.8 (11.6)	61.2 (16.2)	70.1 (21.2)	75.9 (24.4)	75.9 (24.4)	70.4 (21.3)	60.1 (15.6)	49.4 (9.7)	41.3 (5.2)	57.5 (14.2)
Mean minimum °F (°C)	30.5 (−0.8)	33.2 (0.7)	36.2 (2.3)	41.9 (5.5)	49.9 (9.9)	60.7 (15.9)	68.4 (20.2)	67.4 (19.7)	61.8 (16.6)	47.4 (8.6)	35.7 (2.1)	29.8 (−1.2)	27.6 (−2.4)
Record low °F (°C)	15 (−9)	19 (−7)	24 (−4)	32 (0)	37 (3)	49 (9)	56 (13)	59 (15)	44 (7)	32 (0)	28 (−2)	20 (−7)	15 (−9)
Average precipitation inches (mm)	1.80 (46)	1.60 (41)	1.64 (42)	0.50 (13)	0.15 (3.8)	0.12 (3.0)	1.27 (32)	1.30 (33)	1.15 (29)	0.97 (25)	0.77 (20)	1.31 (33)	12.58 (320)
Average precipitation days (≥ 0.01 in)	4.5	4.7	3.8	1.9	1.5	0.6	3.8	4.9	3.3	2.7	2.7	3.9	38.3
Source: National Oceanic and Atmospheric Administration

== Sites of interest ==
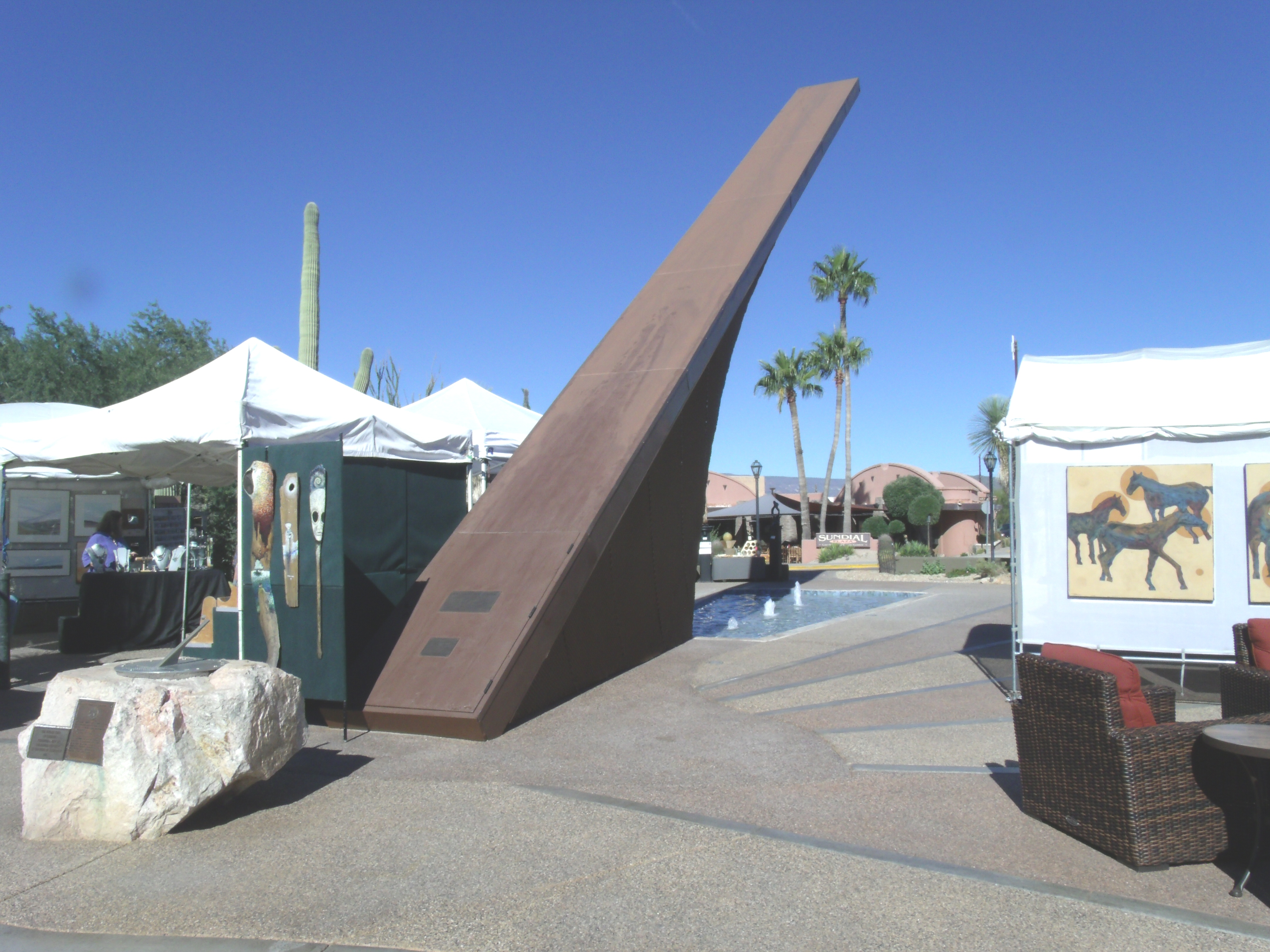
The Carefree Sundial

The Carefree sundial, designed by architect Joe Wong and solar engineer John I. Yellott, was erected in the Sundial Circle plaza in 1959 and claims to be the "third largest sundial in the Western Hemisphere". The sundial, which points to the North Star, is made from a steel frame and covered in anodized copper. It measures 90 feet (27 m) in diameter. The metal gnomon, the shadow-casting portion of the dial, stands 35 feet (11 m) above the plaza and extends 72 feet (22 m).

Carefree was the long-time home of Southwestern Studios, originally built in 1968 as Fred Graham Studios by actor, stunt man, and Arizona Film Commissioner Fred Graham. The sprawling 160-acre (0.65 km^{2}) desert property adjacent to North Scottsdale featured three state-of-the-art soundstages, edit bays, 35mm screening room, make-up, production facilities, western street and backlot. In the early 1970s, Stage 1 of the studio was used for The New Dick Van Dyke Show starring Dick Van Dyke, Hope Lange, Fannie Flagg, and Marty Brill. Stage 1 also was used for the filming of The Other Side of the Wind, starring John Huston, Oja Kodar, Susan Strasberg, Bob Random and Peter Bogdanovich.

The studio was used for the filming of Bob Hope's last feature film, Cancel My Reservation, with Eva Marie Saint, Ralph Bellamy, and Forrest Tucker. Scenes were also shot in Carefree and at the studio for Michelangelo Antonioni's Zabriskie Point, on the back lot, where a mock-up of the Carefree mansion was built and then exploded. The studio was also used for Paul Newman's scenes in Pocket Money; for Bill Cosby's feature debut, Man and Boy, for which the western street was built; and for Bill and Ted's Excellent Adventure, again the western street. The short, silent feature Time River was shot on Stages 2 and 3 and extensively on the back lot and western street sets.

Southwestern Studios was also used in television productions. In 1973–74, local resident Hugh Downs produced and hosted two pilot episodes for a unique show, Foursome, that was both a game show and talk show, where four celebrities came together to play various games and interact with each other. In one episode, actors Janet Leigh and Robert Culp and comedians Jo Anne Worley and Alan Sues played a game of tennis. In another episode filmed on Stage 3, Culp, Worley, Sues, and Ann Miller played a popular board game. In 1974, Southwestern Studios was the location on Stage 2 and the back lot for the filming of the television film McMasters of Sweetwater, starring Jack Cassidy and Loretta Ball and directed by Robert Butler.

Later renamed Carefree Studios, the studio was razed in 1999. The studio, western street, and pristine desert back lot property was developed into retail space and residential development.

Gordon Lightfoot composed and recorded a hit song titled "Carefree Highway". He took the name from a section of Arizona State Route 74 in north Phoenix, to explain his mood at that time. The highway runs from the foot of (North) Tom Darlington Drive at the South-West corner of Carefree about 30 miles westward to Lake Pleasant Parkway in Peoria, Arizona.

== Education ==
The town is served by Cave Creek Unified School District.

== Transportation ==
Arizona State Route 74 runs along the south border of Carefree. Cave Creek Road runs along the east edge of Carefree, then curves and becomes an east-west road through Carefree.

Cave Creek is not a member of Valley Metro and does not have local bus service.

SkyRanch is a private airport located in Carefree.

== Notable residents ==
- Eric Bischoff, entrepreneur and professional wrestling producer
- Frederick J. Brown, visual artist
- Howell Conant, fashion photographer, associated with Grace Kelly
- Hugh Downs, broadcaster, television host, news anchor
- Michael Haugen Jr., professional ten-pin bowler and winner of five PBA Tour titles
- Kathleen Hite, scriptwriter for television and radio
- Wilhelm Kuhweide, German Olympic gold medalist, 1964; four-time world sailing champion
- David Lapham, comic book artist
- Dick Stockton, sportscaster
