= Hugo Lindgren =

American magazine and newspaper editor

Hugo Lindgren is an American magazine and newspaper editor. He was the editor of The New York Times Magazine from 2010 to December 2013 and acting editor of The Hollywood Reporter in 2014. Since 2026 he has worked on the relaunch of Life.

In 2009, he coined the neologism "pessimism porn" to describe the alleged eschatological and survivalist thrill some people derive from reading about and preparing for the collapse of civil society from a global economic crisis. He ran the production company Page 1 Productions with the filmmaker Mark Boal.

== Personal life ==
Lindgren lives in New York City with his wife, writer Sarah Bernard, and his twin daughters. Lindgren attended Duke University.
