= Sally Kirkland (editor) =

American journalist and fashion editor (1912–1989)

Sally Kathleen Kirkland (née Phinney; July 1, 1912 – May 1, 1989) was a manager at Lord & Taylor, a fashion editor at Vogue magazine, and served as the only fashion editor at Life magazine between 1947 and 1969.

== Early life ==
Born as Sarah Kathleen Phinney in El Reno, Oklahoma, the daughter of Col. Robert Truman Phinney and his wife, Ruth Ida "Minnie" Naill, she had one brother, Robert Truman Phinney Jr., who became Vice President of Braniff International Airways. In the 1920s and 1930s, Sally lived in Washington DC with her parents. She graduated from Vassar College in 1934. She married in 1938 in New York City to Frederic McMichael Kirkland, the son of a wealthy Philadelphia Main Line family. Their only child was actress Sally Kirkland (1941–2025).

== Career ==
After graduating from Vassar College in 1934, she worked in the college shop at Lord & Taylor, which was then the headquarters for the best casual American clothes.

=== Vogue ===
In 1939, Kirkland became an assistant editor of Vogue magazine and, by 1946, she was the magazine's fashion editor.

=== Life ===
Kirkland joined Life magazine after working as a correspondent in the Pacific during World War II. From 1947 to 1969, she was the publication's fashion editor; Kirkland has been credited with making the weekly magazine influential in the area of international fashion. She was the first fashion editor to do multiple-model sittings, in which a dozen or so models would be stretched across one and even two pages; her innovation was widely copied. She halted traffic in the Place de la Concorde in Paris to get a fashion picture.

She was one of a "trio of formidable and colorful women" (the other two being film editor Mary Letherbee and modern living editor Mary Hamman) who led the "back of the book" at Life and were given free rein by managing editor and later editor in chief Edward K. Thompson. After she left the magazine, she wrote a book about designer Claire McCardell and contributed articles to the RAM Report, a monthly trade journal.

Kirkland was the first person to hire an African-American, Gordon Parks, at Life Magazine.

== Awards ==
In July 1954 in Rome, stylists including Emilio Schuberth, Vincenzo Ferdinandi, and the Sorelle Fontana, awarded Kirkland a prize for her role as ambassador of Italian fashion in the United States during the "Alta Moda in Castel Sant'Angelo", in the evocative setting of that famous castle. Kirkland also received, at Palazzo Pitti, Florence, the "Order of the Star of Italian Solidarity" in 1954 from the Italian Government for her reports on Italian clothes.

Together with Grace Kelly and Vera Maxwell, Kirkland received a Neiman Marcus Fashion Award in 1955 for her contribution to fashion.

== Death ==
Kirkland died of emphysema, aged 76, at St. Vincent's Hospital, New York City. She lived on the Upper East Side of Manhattan.
