= Bob Gomel =

American photojournalist

Bob Gomel (born August 14, 1933) is an American photojournalist who created images of 1960s world leaders, athletes, entertainers, and major events. His photographs have appeared on the covers of Life, Sports Illustrated, Newsweek, Fortune, and Forbes, and in Time, The New York Times, and Stern, and in more than 40 books. Gomel's images are held in the collections of the U.S. Library of Congress and the Museum of Fine Arts in Houston.

== Early life, education and family ==
Born in New York, Gomel earned a journalism degree from New York University in 1955 and then served as a U.S. naval aviator stationed in Japan from 1955 to 1958.

The father of three sons, Gomel resides in Houston with his wife, Sandra.

== Life years ==
As a Life magazine photographer from January 1959 through June 1969, Gomel's coverage included John F. Kennedy, the Beatles, and Cassius Clay, later known as Muhammad Ali, and Arnold Palmer. Gomel's major-event coverage included the 1962 Cuban Missile Crisis, the 1963 March on Washington, the 1963 funeral of President Kennedy, the 1964 Democratic National Convention, the 1965 Northeast blackout, the 1968 funeral of Sen. Robert Kennedy, the 1968 Democratic National Convention, the 1968 Republican National Convention, the 1969 funeral of President Dwight D. Eisenhower, United Nations debates, and the baseball World Series. In 1964, the University of Missouri School of Journalism honored Gomel with the best news photo of the year. The photo reflected the passion in the keynote speech of Sen. John O. Pastore at the 1964 Democratic National Convention.

Gomel's 1965 photograph of the blackout-darkened New York City skyline in moonlight is believed to be the first double-exposure image published as a news photograph. In 1966, editors selected Gomel's "Kayaker in White Water" for inclusion in Life's Best of Year issue. In 1967, Gomel's Life photo essay on strip-mining in Appalachia helped lead to regulatory reform. Gomel's 1969 Life cover shot of President Eisenhower lying in state was the first news photograph taken from the dome of the U.S. Capitol Rotunda. His camera was fired remotely by wire to a foot switch hundreds of feet below the dome.

== After Life ==
From the 1970s through the 1990s, Gomel shifted his focus to commercial photography, and he moved to Houston in 1977. He shot national advertising campaigns throughout the world for Audi, Bulova, GTE, Merrill Lynch ("Bullish on America"), Pan Am Airways, Pennzoil, Shell Oil, the U.S. Army, and Volkswagen, and professional services companies, such as law firms and medical practices.

In 2010, Gomel's photograph, "Malcolm X Photographing Muhammad Ali", was acquired by the Library of Congress. In 2016, Gomel donated his photography archives to the University of Texas Dolph Briscoe Center for American History.

In recent years, Gomel has made international travel photography. In 2020, he was featured in Bob Gomel: Eyewitness, a documentary directed by David Scarbrough. In 2022, on the 60th anniversary of President John F. Kennedy's "moon-shot" speech at Rice University, his photography from the speech and other moments in early-1960s space program history was displayed in NASA Johnson Space Center and Rice University commemorative events. In 2024, the City of Houston proclaimed April 23 as "Bob Gomel Day", recognizing Gomel for dedicating "eight decades to the advancement of American photojournalism and imagery of world cultures."

== Publications ==
- The Fight. Norman Mailer. 1975 and 2013, Random House. ISBN 9780812986129.
- The Civil Rights Movement: A Photographic History. Steven Kasher. 1996, Abbeville. ISBN 9780789206565.
- Life Sixty Years: A 60th Anniversary Celebration. 1996, Time-Life. ISBN 9781883013608.
- Life Goes to the Movies. David Edward Scherman. 1975, Time-Life. ISBN 9780809416431.
- Art Buchwald: Leaving Home, a Memoir. 1994, Putnam Adult. ISBN 9780786201587.
- The Beatles: From Yesterday to Today. Charles Hirshberg. 1996, Bullfinch; Time Life. ISBN 9780821223178.
- Life: Century of Change: America in Pictures. Richard B. Stolley. 2000, Time-Life. ISBN 9780821226971.
- Mafia. The Editors of Time-Life Books. 2003, Time-Life. ISBN 9781844471034.
- Arnold Palmer: A Personal Journey. Thomas Houser. 2004, HarperCollins. ISBN 9781938069499.
- These Guys are Good: They Live to Play, They Play to Win: the Spirit and Drama of the PGA TOUR. 2005, Tehabi Sports. ISBN 9781933208008.
- Building New York: The Rise and Rise of the Greatest City on Earth. Bruce Marshall. 2005, Universe. ISBN 9780789313621.
- Memories of John Lennon. Edited by Yoko Ono. 2005, HarperCollins)
- The Art of Caring: A Look at Life Through Photography. Cynthia Goodman. 2009, Ruder-Finn. ISBN 9781932646504.
- 2010–2011 Rules of Golf. United States Golf Association. 2009. ISBN 9780941774109.
- Moonfire, The Epic Journey of Apollo 11. Norman Mailer. 2010, Taschen. ISBN 9783836556224.
- Life 75 Years: The Very Best of Life. 2011, Time-Life. ISBN 9781603202121.
- Life Books: The Day Kennedy Died. 2013, Time-Life. ISBN 9781618930743.
- Five Days in November. Clint Hill and Lisa McCubbin. 2013, Gallery, a Division of Simon & Schuster. ISBN 9781476731490.
- JFK: Superman Comes to the Supermarket. Norman Mailer and Nina Weiner. 2014, Taschen. ISBN 9783836550338.
- The 1960s: The Decade When Everything Changed. 2014, Time-Life.
- Life Books: Lincoln: An Intimate Portrait. The Editors of Life. 2014, Time-Life. ISBN 9781618930729.
- Blood Brothers: The Fatal Friendship Between Muhammad Ali and Malcolm X. 2016, Basic. ISBN 9780465079704.

== Collections ==
Gomel's work is held in the following permanent collections:

- Dolph Briscoe Center for American History, University of Texas at Austin: "Ranging in date from 1959 to 2014, the Bob Gomel Photographic Archive consists of film negatives, contact sheets and exhibit prints"
- Library of Congress, Washington, D.C.
- Museum of Fine Arts, Houston: 8 prints (as of 30 April 2024)
