= Edward Kramer Thompson =

American writer (1907–1996)

Edward Kramer Thompson (January 15, 1907 – October 8, 1996) was an American writer and editor. He was the editor of Life from its early days as a weekly and was the founding editor of Smithsonian magazine.

== Biography ==
Thompson was born in 1907 in St. Thomas, North Dakota, to Edward T. Thompson, a dry goods business proprietor and local banker. After finishing high school at 15, he went with his mother to Grand Forks, North Dakota, at the age of 16 to begin his studies at the University of North Dakota.

His first wife was Marguerite Maxam, from Montana, whom he married in 1928. The first of his two sons, Edward T. Thompson would become the editor of Reader's Digest. He would move to Milwaukee, Wisconsin, with his family in 1929 to work for the Milwaukee Journal where he would remain until 1937.

=== Life ===
While at the Milwaukee Journal he also worked as a stringer for Time which brought him to the attention of Henry Luce who was thinking about introducing a national picture magazine, which would become Life. Luce hired Thompson in 1937 as assistant picture editor for this new venture. From 1949–1961 he was the managing editor. During this time he came to know Lee Eitingon, who would become his second wife in 1963. Thompson was known for the free rein he gave his editors, particularly a "trio of formidable and colorful women: Sally Kirkland, fashion editor; Mary Letherbee, movie editor; and Mary Hamman, modern living editor." He retired from Life as editor in chief, in 1970.

=== Smithsonian ===
Next he "invented", to use his word, Smithsonian magazine. "To those all-out converts to computerized journalism who declaim that 'print is dead,' I say, 'Not so fast.'" are his opening words of his book: A Love Affair with Life & Smithsonian published by the University of Missouri Press in October 1995. His other 'invention' was the magazine Impact which he created for the Army Air Forces during his time out during World War II; Life, he would say, was Henry Luce's invention.

=== Death ===
He died on October 8, 1996.
