= John Shaw Billings (editor) =

John Shaw Billings (1898–1975) was the first editor of Life magazine and first managing editor of Time-Life.

== Background ==
Billings descended from U.S. Senator James Henry Hammond (1807–1864). His grandfather (also John Shaw Billings) was an Army medical doctor during the Civil War. After the war, he established an Army medical library with the first modern bibliographical system for medical knowledge. He later became one of the best-known, early 20th-century librarians as director of the New York Public Library.

Billings was born at Redcliffe manor in Beech Island, South Carolina, a plantation built by his great-grandfather the senator (famed for the saying "Cotton is king").

He left Harvard University to drive ammunition trucks for the army of France in World War I.

== Career ==
After the great war, Billings became a reporter for the Bridgeport Telegram. Fired for his purple prose, he joined the Brooklyn Daily Eagle as its Washington correspondent.

In 1928, Billings began working for Time magazine, again as Washington correspondent (and replacing Henry Cabot Lodge Jr.). In 1929, he became National Affairs editor.

By 1933, he became Time's managing editor. In 1936, Luce asked him to become the first editor of Life.

In 1944, he became deputy editorial director under Luce for Time-Life's four publications: Time, Life, Architectural Forum, and Fortune.

He retired in the 1950s.

== Personal and death ==
In the 1930s, Billings bought and restored the Hammond family's Savannah River home "Redcliffe." After visiting him there, Henry R. Luce bought Mepkin Plantation (now Mepkin Abbey) for his wife, Claire Booth Luce.

Billings died in late August 1975.

== Legacy ==
At time of death, Edward K. Thompson, a following Life managing editor (1949–1961) said of Billings, "He lived his entire life by what landed on his desk. He interpreted the world as something he edited, whether text or pictures. He was an editor's editor."

In 1975, the Billings family gave the first major endowment for the newly expanded Thomas Cooper Library. "Funds generated by the John Shaw Billings Library Endowment have provided for the acquisition of significant materials for the Irvin Department of Rare Books and Special Collections (such as the Nuremberg Chronicle, 1493) and for other library needs." The library also houses the John Shaw Billings Papers and Collections, as well as those of his ancestor, U.S. Senator James Henry Hammond (1807-1864). A Time-Life-Fortune collection, 1886-1964, is also archived there.

== See also ==
- James Henry Hammond great-grandfather
- John Shaw Billings grandfather
- Henry R. Luce
- Time
- Life
- Time-Life

== External sources ==
- University of South Carolina: John Shaw Billings Library Endowment
