= Peter B. Martin =

American photographer and publisher

Peter B. Martin, Sr. (1915–1992) was an American photographer and publisher. Martin was one of the top New York City publishing photographers in the 1950s, with work published in Mademoiselle, Cosmopolitan, Life, and McCall's.

From the late 1940s to the 1960s, he was a fashion photographer and photojournalist. He photographed many celebrities including Frank Sinatra, Bunk Johnson, Edgar Bergen, Imogene Coca, Edward R Murrow, Arthur Schlesinger, Jr, Leonard Bernstein, Eleanor Roosevelt, Natalie Wood, James Dean, Vera Zorina, Kim Novak, Ann Francis, Sheree North, Walt Disney, Jack Webb, the Allman Brothers, Jim Morrison, The Doors, Jimi Hendrix, The Grateful Dead and Janis Joplin. In addition to his photography, Martin published periodicals about photography (Figure and Photography Workshop) during the early 1950s, and in the late 1950s and 1960s he published television and music magazines (Movie Teen Illustrated and Pop Rock).

== Photography Workshop ==
New York was a photojournalism mecca in the 1950s, and Peter Martin's "studio 61" at 286 Bleecker Street in Greenwich Village, New York, was a gathering place for many photographers at that time. Many contributed to the Photography Workshop publication, which was devoted to the photographer's work, techniques, equipment and art.

=== Photography Workshop Summer 1950 contents ===
Editor: Peter Martin; Associate Editors: Fred Sparks, Joan Marsh, Fred Lyon

- Technical Story of the Year
- Parlor, Bedlam and Flashbulb
- Photo-Journalism
- The Case History of A Picture Story "Fairy Tale On Fifth Avenue"
- Fashion Photography
- The Ford Girls
- Portrait Photography
- Figure Photography (Fred Lyon)
- The Reluctant Photographer
- The Photographer in Europe (by Fred Sparks)
- The Child as a Photographic Subject
- A Subject Eyes The Photographer
- Four Picture Assignments
- Circle of Confusion (photos by Peter Martin)

=== Photography Workshop Fall 1950 contents ===
- The Photographer's Story
- Press Photography
- Voodoo Photography (Earl Leaf)
- The LIfe, Times and Photographs of Halsman
- Thumbnail Photographs 1935–1950
- Damascus: An Early Picture HIstory
- Philippe & The Rita
- Portraits
- 42 Life Magazine Halsman Covers
- Theatre and Dance
- Salvador Dalí
- Model "t" Fashion Photography
- Halsman Technique
- Figure Photography
- Anatomic props

=== Photography Workshop Fall 1951 contents ===
- Assignment in Studio 61
- 12 Photographers:
  - Fred Lyon
  - Fernand Fonssagrives
  - Ruth Orkin
  - Stephen Colhoun
  - Dan Wynn
  - Gleb Derrujinsky, Jr.
  - Herbert Giles
  - Jerry Yulsman
  - Genevieve Naylor
  - Richard Litwin
  - Ted Croner
  - W. Eugene Smith
