= Birkat HaGomel =

Jewish prayer

Birkat HaGomel (pronounced [/birˈkat haɡoˈmel/]; Hebrew: בִּרְכַּת הַגּוֹמֵל, lit. 'Blessing [of] the Benefactor') is a bracha (בְּרָכָה, 'blessing') of gratitude and thanksgiving recited by a Jewish individual who has survived a serious illness, dangerous journey, or personal peril. The prayer acknowledges God's kindness in saving the individual. It is traditionally recited in the synagogue following one of the day's Torah readings, such as during Shacharit on Shabbat.

== Text ==
The full English translation of the Birkat HaGomel is:

"Blessed are You, LORD our God, King of the universe, who bestows good things upon the unworthy, and who has bestowed every goodness upon me."

== Circumstances of recitation ==
Birkat HaGomel may be recited in any of the four following circumstances. In the opinion of Rabbi Moses Uri HaLevi, one should not recite the blessing outside of said circumstances, as determined by Chazal.

1. After recovery from serious illness (e.g., cancer): When a person recovers from a life-threatening or severe illness, they may recite the prayer to thank God for their healing.
2. After surviving a dangerous journey: Those who have traveled through hazardous conditions (e.g., long-distance travel, especially in ancient times when roads were unsafe) traditionally recite this prayer to express gratitude for a safe return.
3. After escaping danger: Individuals who have survived a perilous situation, such as a natural disaster, a violent encounter, or other life-threatening scenarios, may recite Birkat HaGomel.
4. Following the birth of a child: In some communities, the birth mother may recite Birkat HaGomel in the wake of childbirth, acknowledging the difficulties of childbirth and the survival of both mother and child. However, this is a more modern practice and was not practiced around the time of the Middle Ages.

== Talmudic sources and halakhic debate ==
The origin of Birkat HaGomel is rooted in the Talmud's tractate Berakhot 54b:12:

Rav Yehuda said that Rav said: Four must offer thanks to God with a thanks-offering and a special blessing. They are: Seafarers, those who walk in the desert, and one who was ill and recovered, and one who was incarcerated in prison and went out. All of these appear in the verses of a psalm (Psalm 107).

Rav Yehuda, citing Rav Abba Arikha (a.k.a. Rav Abba bar Aybo), teaches that someone who survives illness, a dangerous journey, or other life-threatening situations should give thanks to God. However, there is ongoing debate among halakhic authorities regarding the timing, manner, and who should recite the blessing. The array of Jewish communities has developed distinct practices.

Maimonides ruled that Birkat HaGomel is a public declaration of gratitude, while other scholars, like the Rashba, argue it should be a private prayer of thanksgiving. In modern times, the general consensus is that the prayer is to be recited publicly after an aliyah during services.
