= Japanese occupation of the Philippines =

Part of World War II

Philippines フィリピン (Japanese) Pilipinas (Filipino)
- 1941–1945
- Flag of the Empire of Japan and Flag of the Philippines Coat of arms
- Motto: 八紘一宇 ("Hakkō ichiu") 'Eight Crown Cords, One Roof'
- Anthem: 君が代 ("Kimigayo") 'His Majesty's Reign' Lupang Hinirang (unofficial) "Chosen Land"
- Philippines (dark red) within the Empire of Japan (light red) at its furthest extent
- Status: Military occupation by the Empire of Japan
- Capital: Manila
- Common languages: Japanese, Filipino
- Emperor
  - 1942–1945: Hirohito
- Military Governor
  - 1942: Masaharu Homma (First)
  - 1944–1945: Tomoyuki Yamashita (Last)
- Leader
  - 1942–1943: Jorge B. Vargas (Note: As Chairman of the PEC)
  - 1943–1945: Jose P. Laurel (Note: As President of the Second Philippine Republic)
- Legislature: Philippine Executive Commission (1942–1943) National Assembly (1943–1945)
- Historical era: World War II
  - Start of Japanese Invasion: December 8 1941
  - Formation of Hukbalahap: March 29, 1942
  - Fall of Bataan: April 9, 1942
  - Bataan Death March: April 9–17, 1942
  - Fall of Corregidor: May 6, 1942
  - Comfort Women system: 1942–1945
  - Establishment of the Second Philippine Republic (Note: Japan installed a puppet government under President Jose P. Laurel to try to legitimize their rule.): October 14, 1943
  - Allied Liberation of the Philippines: October 20, 1944 – August 15, 1945
  - Battle of Leyte Gulf: October 20–26, 1944
  - Manila Massacre and Battle of Manila: February 3 – March 3, 1945
  - Surrender of Japan: September 2, 1945
  - Independence proclaimed (Note: from the United States): July 4, 1946
- Currency: Japanese government–issued Philippine peso
Preceded by	Succeeded by
Commonwealth of the Philippines	Philippines campaign (1944–1945)
- Today part of: Philippines

The Japanese Empire occupied the Commonwealth of the Philippines between 1942 and 1945 during World War II.

Japan invaded the Philippines on December 8, 1941, ten hours after the attack on Pearl Harbor. As at Pearl Harbor, American aircraft were severely damaged in the initial Japanese attack. Lacking air cover, the American Asiatic Fleet in the Philippines withdrew to Java on December 12, 1941. General Douglas MacArthur was ordered out, leaving his men at Corregidor on the night of 11 March 1942 for Australia, 4,000 km away. The 76,000 starving and sick American and Filipino defenders in Bataan surrendered on April 9, 1942, and were forced to endure the infamous Bataan Death March on which 7,000–10,000 died or were murdered. The 13,000 survivors on Corregidor surrendered on 6 May.

Japan occupied the Philippines for over three years, until the surrender of Japan. A highly effective guerrilla campaign by Philippine resistance forces controlled sixty percent of the islands, mostly forested and mountainous areas. MacArthur supplied them by submarine and sent reinforcements and officers. The Filipino population remained generally loyal to the United States, partly because of the American guarantee of independence, partly because of the Japanese mistreatment of Filipinos after the surrender, and partly because the Japanese had pressed large numbers of Filipinos into work details and put young Filipino women into brothels.

General MacArthur kept his promise to return to the Philippines on October 20, 1944. The landings on the island of Leyte were accompanied by a force of 700 vessels and 174,000 men. The initial Leyte landing was followed by landings on Mindoro, Luzon, and Mindanao. During the campaign, the Imperial Japanese Army conducted a suicidal defense of the islands. Cities such as Manila were reduced to rubble. Around 500,000 Filipinos died during the occupation.

== Background ==
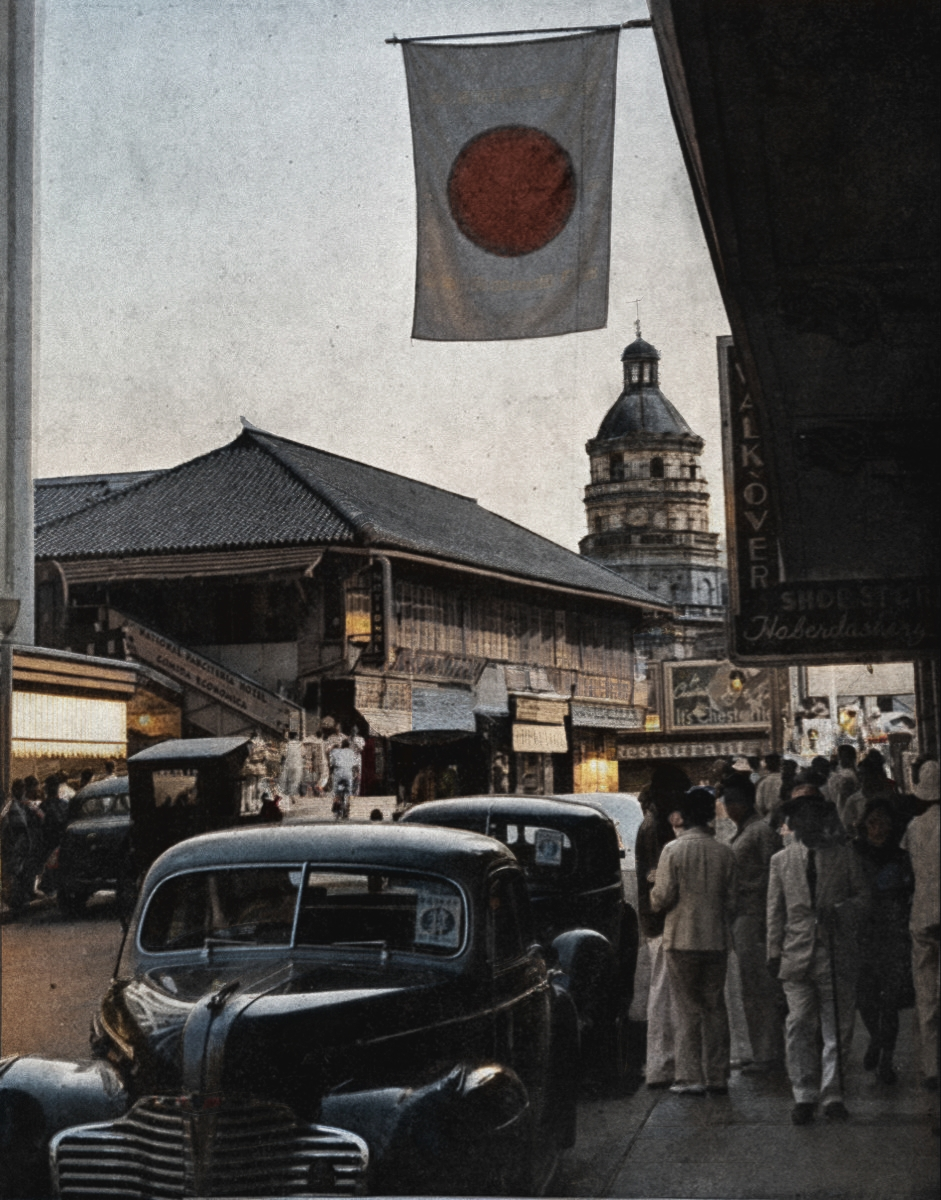
Manila during the Japanese occupation.

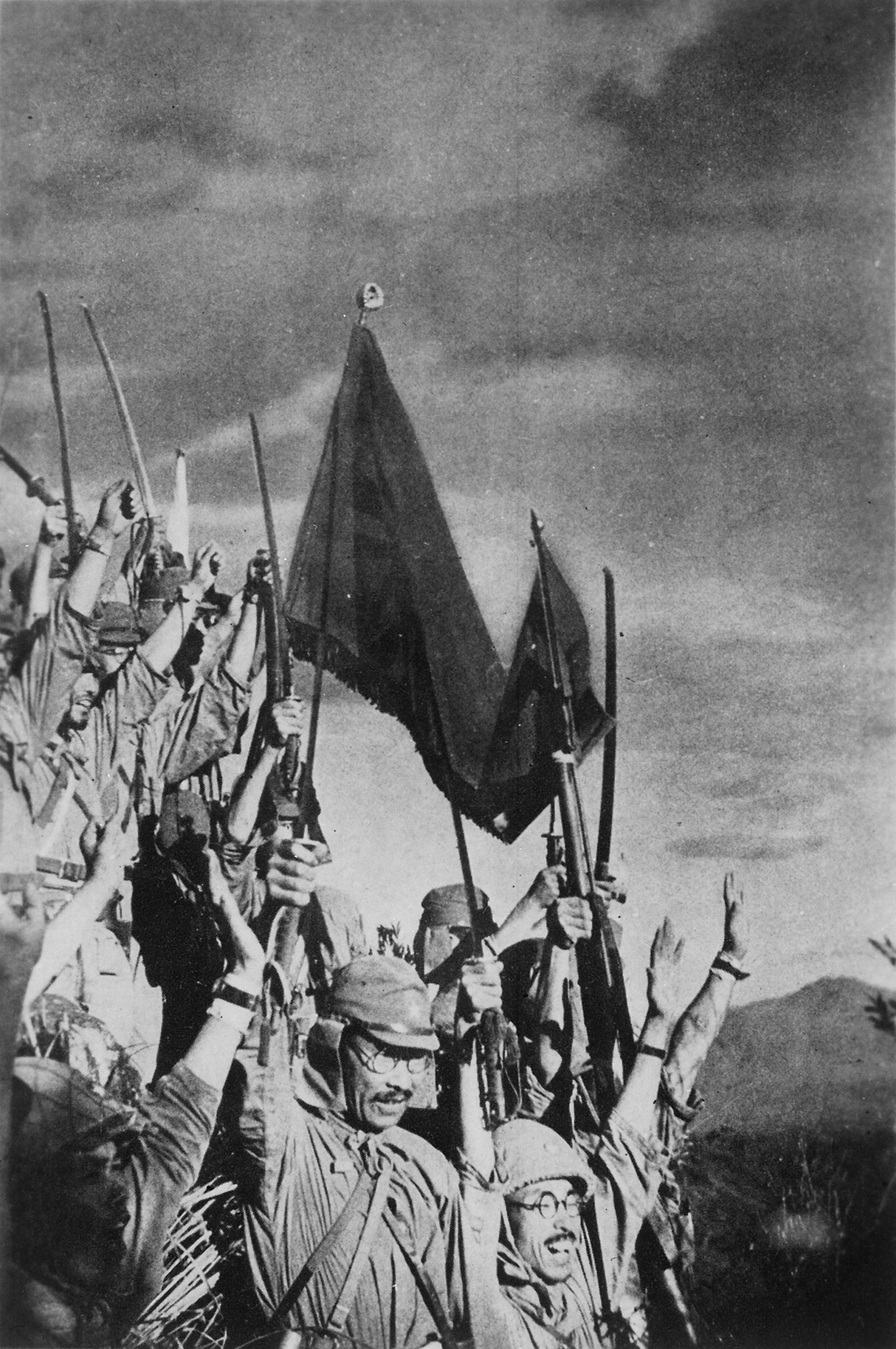
Japanese troops celebrate their conquest of Bataan Peninsula, Philippines

Japan launched an attack on the Philippines on December 8, 1941, just ten hours after their attack on Pearl Harbor. Initial aerial bombardment was followed by landings of ground troops both north and south of Manila. The defending Philippine and United States troops were under the command of General Douglas MacArthur, who had been recalled to active duty in the United States Army earlier in the year and was designated commander of the United States Armed Forces in the Asia-Pacific region. The aircraft of his command were destroyed; the naval forces were ordered to leave; and because of the circumstances in the Pacific region, reinforcement and resupply of his ground forces were impossible. Under the pressure of superior numbers, the defending forces withdrew to the Bataan Peninsula and to the island of Corregidor at the entrance to Manila Bay. Manila, declared an open city to prevent its destruction, was occupied by the Japanese on 2 January 1942.

The Philippine defense continued until the final surrender of US-Philippine forces on the Bataan Peninsula on April 10, 1942, and on Corregidor on May 6, 1942. Quezon and Osmeña had accompanied the troops to Corregidor and later left for the United States, where they set up a government-in-exile. MacArthur was ordered to Australia, where he started to plan for a return to the Philippines. Quezon's political rival, former president Aguinaldo, sided with the Japanese invaders as a collaborator. In exchange, Japan initially was going to appoint Aguinaldo as President of a Japanese puppet-state in the Philippines, but later gave him the position of National Distribution Corporation head, placing him in charge of rationing prime commodities for the Japanese war effort.

Most of the 80,000 prisoners of war captured by the Japanese at Bataan were forced to undertake the "Bataan Death March" to Camp O'Donnell prison camp in Capas, Tarlac 105 kilometers to the north of Mariveles Bataan. Thousands of men, weakened by disease and malnutrition and treated harshly by their captors, died before reaching their destination. More men died from Japanese mistreatment in the first four months in the camps than had died in the four months of battle previously.

== The occupation ==
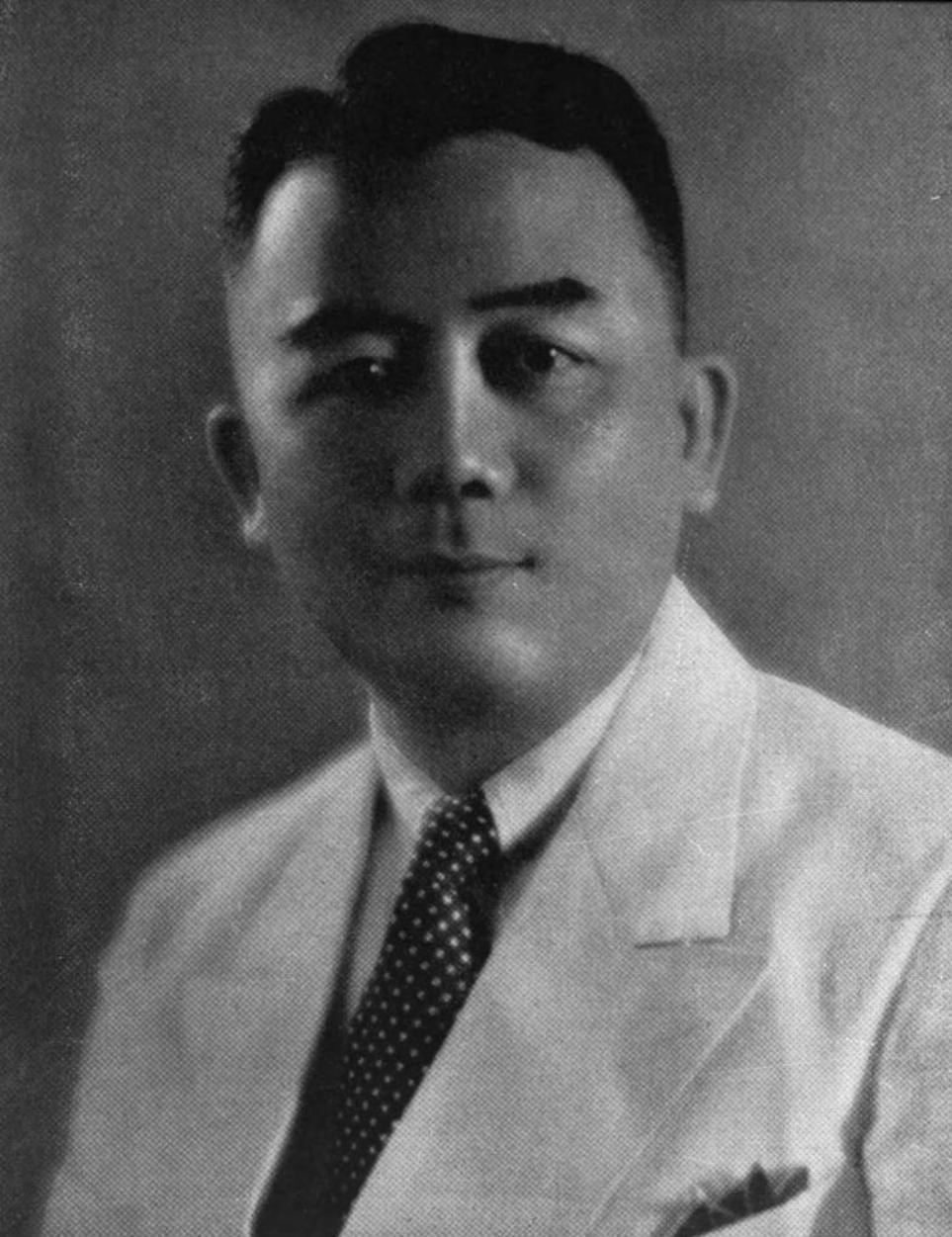
Jorge B. Vargas held the highest position of power for a Filipino during the Philippine Executive Commission of the Japanese occupation. He was asked by the Japanese to assume the Presidency, but he declined, and instead served as the regime's ambassador to Japan.

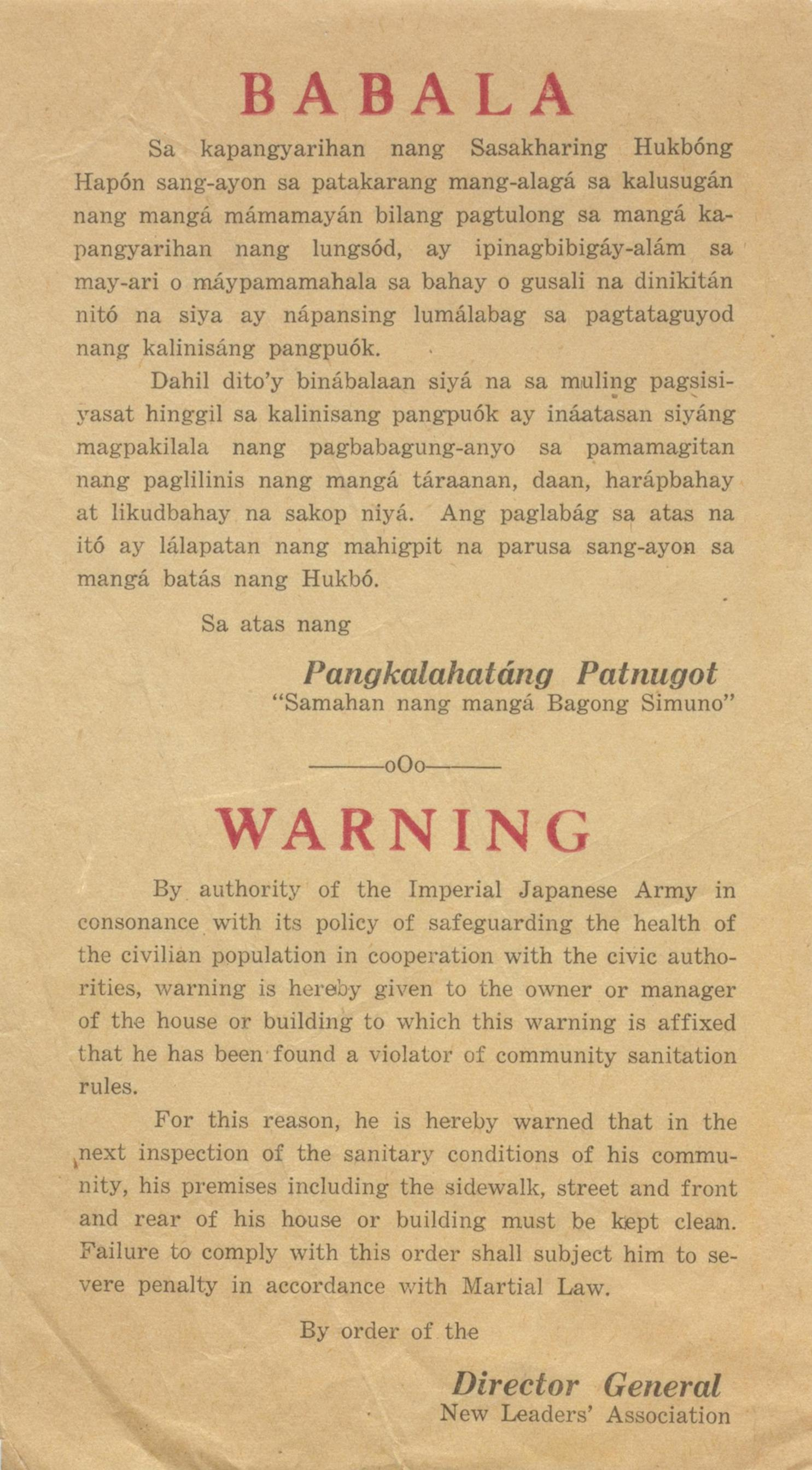
Warning for residents to keep their premises sanitary or face punishment

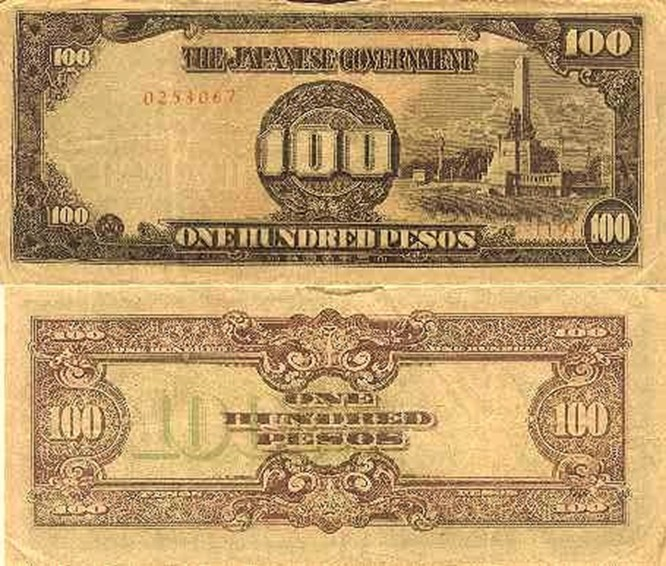
A 100-peso note made by the Japanese during the occupation

The Japanese military authorities immediately began organizing a new government structure in the Philippines. Although the Japanese had promised independence for the islands after occupation, they initially organized a Council of State through which they directed civil affairs until October 1943, when they declared the Philippines an independent republic. Most of the Philippine elite, with a few notable exceptions, served under the Japanese. The puppet republic was headed by President José P. Laurel. Philippine collaboration in the puppet government began under Jorge B. Vargas, who was originally appointed by Quezon as the mayor of the City of Greater Manila before Quezon departed Manila. The only political party allowed during the occupation was the Japanese-organized KALIBAPI. During the occupation, most Filipinos remained loyal to the United States, and war crimes committed by forces of the Japanese Empire against surrendered Allied forces and civilians were documented.

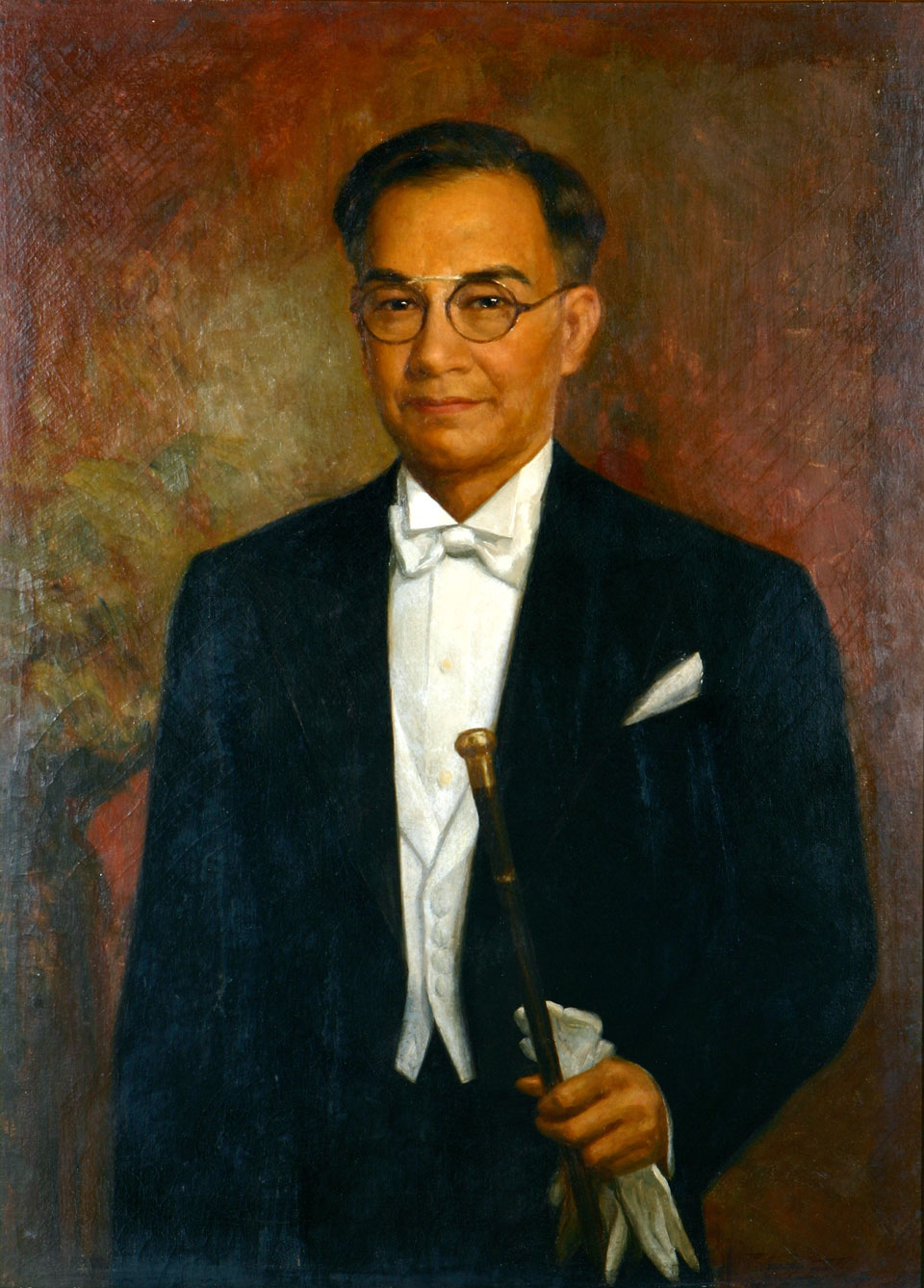
Jose P. Laurel president of the Second Philippine Republic which was a Puppet state of the Empire of Japan.

Throughout the Philippines more than a thousand Filipinos, composed of mothers, girls, and gay men, some as young as 10, were imprisoned, forcibly taken as "comfort women", and kept in sexual slavery for Japanese military personnel during the occupation. Each of the Japanese military installations in the Philippines during the occupation had a location where the women were held, which they called a "comfort station". One such place where these women were imprisoned was Bahay na Pula. The Filipinos that were forced to sexual slavery by the Japanese were kidnapped from the population and were routinely gang-raped, tortured, and humiliated. Many of them had their breasts cut off or received damaging wounds whenever they fought back against the soldiers' sexual advancements. Many were also murdered and disposed like animals. Decades after the war, victims of Japan's colonial sex slave system initiated for their documented slavery to be inscribed to the UNESCO Memory of the World Register; however, Japan's government blocked the inscription to defend itself from its own war crimes by using its monetary contributions to threaten UNESCO. Aside from the "comfort women" system imposed by Japan against Filipinos, many Japanese also routinely raped Filipinos outside of the "comfort women" system. For example, during the Manila massacre, upon feeling that they were losing the war, the Japanese conducted a mass rape of Manila's population. The Japanese were also known to have killed Filipino infants as an act of entertainment and stress-reliever.

Cannibalism was also conducted by the Japanese on the remains of murdered civilian Filipinos during and after the occupation. Notable examples occurred in Bukidnon, where after the war, the Philippine Military Police documented seven Japanese soldiers ghoulishly feasting on the flesh of a murdered Filipino woman at Malaybalay. Malaybalay at the time was forested and had numerous wildlife that can be hunted, fruit-bearing trees, and fish-filled rivers. The report was the third cannibalism incident conducted by the Japanese in the Bukidnon plateau alone. Numerous cannibalism incidents occurred across the country.

The Japanese also sent "doctors" and "surgeons" to the Philippines, who performed human experimentation on native Filipinos. Some of these experiments included amputations, dissections, and suturing blood vessels of live humans. Surgeons gruesomely performed vivisections on Filipinos. Before such experiments, the victims were forced by the Japanese to dig their own graves first. In some cases, the bodies of vivisected Filipinos were sewn back up, then the living victims were shot dead. In other cases, the vivisected victims were left with huge open stomachs and then dumped in their graves along with their intestines and left to die. Many of the doctors and surgeons who performed their human experiments kept quiet about their deeds until some information came out decades after the war. In those cases, the "wartime friends" of the doctors who exposed their own acts tried to prevent the historical stories from coming out to the public in a bid to defend Japanese war crimes. The majority of the doctors, however, never spoke about their crimes and remained at-large in Japan until their comfortable retirement. Some Japanese ultra-nationalists have harassed doctors who wanted to talk about the crimes they committed during the war. After the war, then General Douglas MacArthur decided to withhold information about Japan's human experimentation from the war crimes tribunal in the interest of improving of American-Japanese relations amid the growing threat of communism. This prevented persecution of the Japanese doctors involved. The United States afterwards received human experimentation data from Japan in exchange for MacArthur's actions.

=== Resistance ===
Japanese occupation of the Philippines was opposed by active and successful underground and guerrilla activity that increased over the years and eventually covered a large portion of the country. Opposing these guerrillas were a Japanese-formed Bureau of Constabulary (later taking the name of the old Constabulary during the Second Republic), Kempeitai, and the Makapili. Postwar investigations showed that about 260,000 people were in guerrilla organizations and that members of the anti-Japanese underground were even more numerous. Such was their effectiveness that by the end of the war, Japan controlled only twelve of the forty-eight provinces.

The Philippine guerrilla movement continued to grow, in spite of Japanese campaigns against them. Throughout Luzon and the southern islands, Filipinos joined various groups and vowed to fight the Japanese. The commanders of these groups made contact with one another, argued about who was in charge of what territory, and began to formulate plans to assist the return of American forces to the islands. They gathered important intelligence information and smuggled it out to the US Army, a process that sometimes took months. General MacArthur formed a clandestine operation to support the guerrillas. He had Lieutenant Commander Charles "Chick" Parsons smuggle guns, radios, and supplies to them by submarine. The guerrilla forces, in turn, built up their stashes of arms and explosives and made plans to assist MacArthur's invasion by sabotaging Japanese communications lines and attacking Japanese forces from the rear.

Various guerrilla forces formed throughout the archipelago, ranging from groups of US Armed Forces in the Far East (USAFFE) forces who refused to surrender to local militia initially organized to combat banditry brought about by disorder caused by the invasion. Several islands in the Visayas region had guerrilla forces led by Filipino officers, such as Colonel Macario Peralta in Panay, Major Ismael Ingeniero in Bohol, and Captain Salvador Abcede in Negros.

The island of Mindanao, being farthest from the center of Japanese occupation, had 38,000 guerrillas who were eventually consolidated under the command of American civil engineer Colonel Wendell Fertig. Fertig's guerrillas included many American and Filipino troops who had been part of the force on Mindanao under Major General William F. Sharp. When Wainwright had ordered Sharp's forces to surrender, Sharp considered himself compelled to obey this order. Many of the American and Filipino officers refused to surrender, since they reasoned that Wainwright, now a prisoner who could be considered under duress, had no authority to issue orders to Sharp. For several reasons, it was unknown how many did not surrender, although probably around 100 to 200 Americans ended up with Fertig's guerrillas. The names of new Filipino recruits were purposefully left off the lists of men to be surrendered. In other cases, documents were fabricated to report fewer men than were actually under Sharp. Other troops died for various reasons after getting away and others left Mindanao entirely.

One resistance group in the Central Luzon area was known as the Hukbalahap (Hukbo ng Bayan Laban sa Hapon), or the People's Anti-Japanese Army, organized in early 1942 under the leadership of Luis Taruc, a communist party member since 1939. By the end of the war, the Huks had armed some 30,000 people and extended their control over portions of Luzon, including most of the provinces of Tarlac, Pampanga and Nueva Ecija. However, guerrilla activities on Luzon were hampered due to the heavy Japanese presence and infighting between the various groups, including Hukbalahap troops attacking American-led guerrilla units.

Lack of equipment, rough terrain, and undeveloped infrastructure made coordination of these groups nearly impossible, and for several months in 1942, all contact was lost with the Philippine resistance forces. Communications were restored in November 1942 when the reformed Philippine 61st Division on Panay island, led by Colonel Macario Peralta, was able to establish radio contact with the USAFFE command in Australia. This enabled the forwarding of intelligence regarding Japanese forces in the Philippines to the SWPA command, as well as consolidating the once sporadic guerrilla activities and allowing the guerrillas to help in the war effort.

Increasing amounts of supplies and radios were delivered by submarine to aid the guerrilla effort. By the time of the Leyte invasion, four submarines were dedicated exclusively to the delivery of supplies.

Other guerrilla units were attached to the SWPA, and were active throughout the archipelago. Some of these units were organized or directly connected to pre-surrender units ordered to mount guerrilla actions. An example of this was Troop C, 26th Cavalry. Other guerrilla units were made up of former Philippine Army and Philippine Scouts soldiers who had been released from POW camps by the Japanese. Others were combined units of Americans, military and civilian, who had never surrendered or had escaped after surrendering, and Filipinos, Christians, and Moros, who had initially formed their own small units. Colonel Wendell Fertig organized such a group on Mindanao that not only effectively resisted the Japanese, but formed a complete government that often operated in the open throughout the island. Some guerrilla units would later be assisted by American submarines which delivered supplies, evacuate refugees and the injured, as well as inserted individuals and whole units, such as the 5217th Reconnaissance Battalion and Alamo Scouts.

By the end of the war, some 277 separate guerrilla units, made up of some 260,715 individuals, fought in the resistance movement. Select units of the resistance would go on to be reorganized and equipped as units of the Philippine Army and Constabulary.

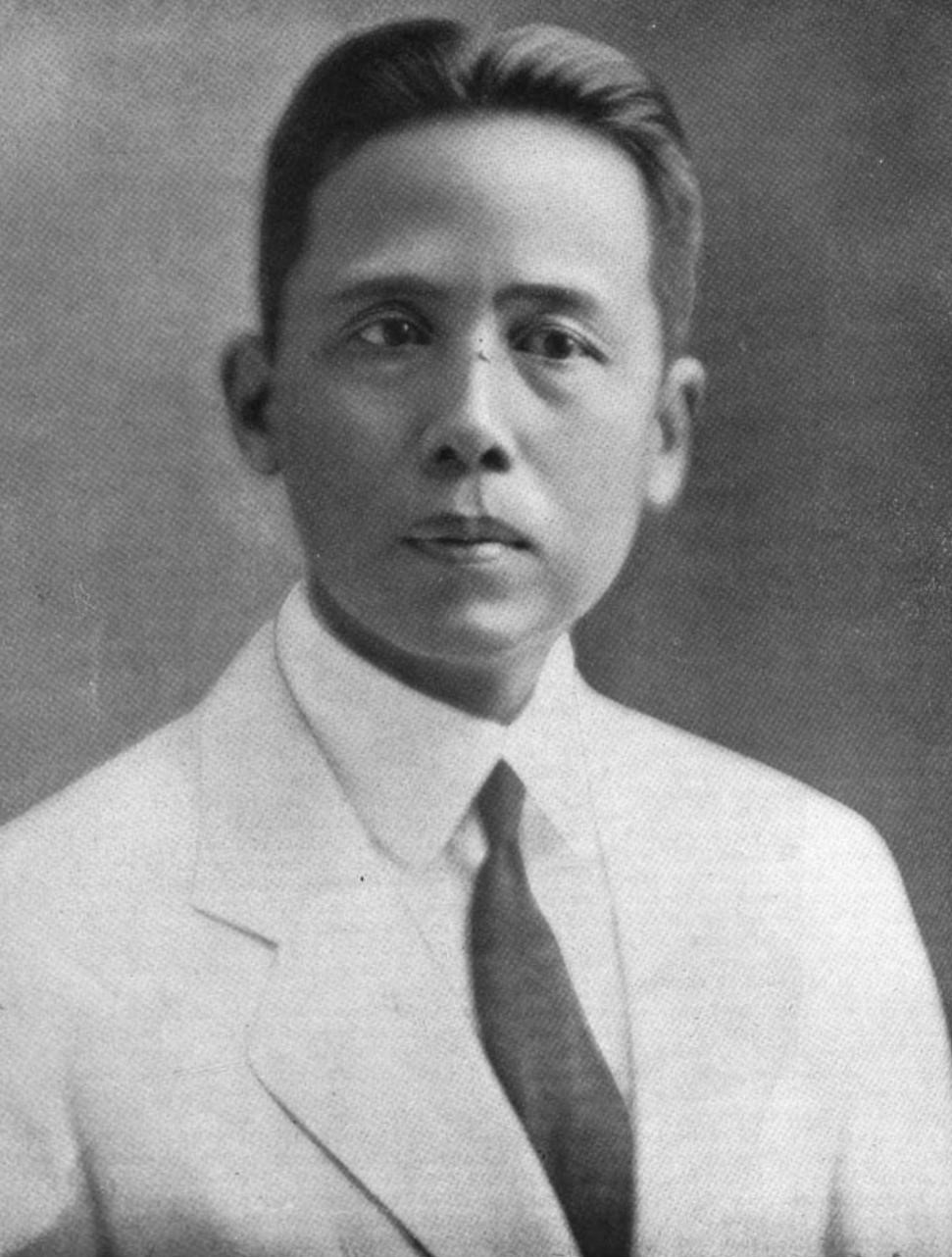
Chief Justice José Abad Santos appointed by President Quezon as the acting president of the Philippines on his behalf while the Commonwealth government was in exile in the United States. Santos was killed by the Japanese.

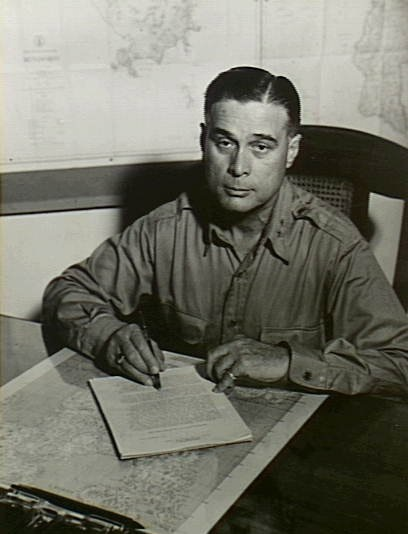
General Basilio Valdes has the direction of recruiting former members of the Philippines Army disbanded by the Japanese when they occupied the Philippines

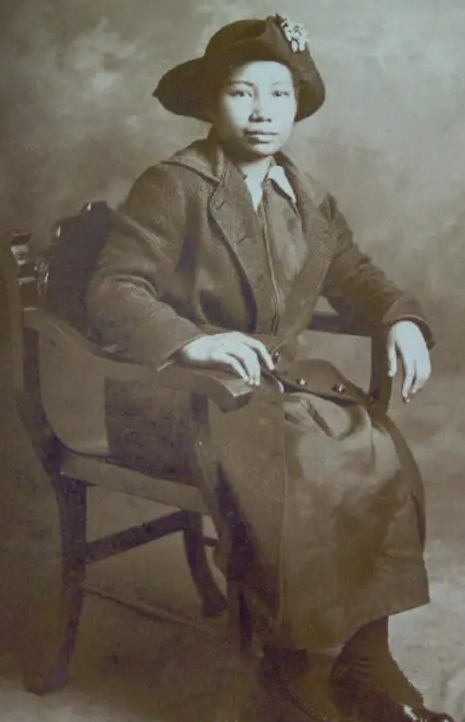
María Orosa helped smuggle into Japanese-run internment camps, saving the lives of thousands of Filipinos, Americans, and other nationals.

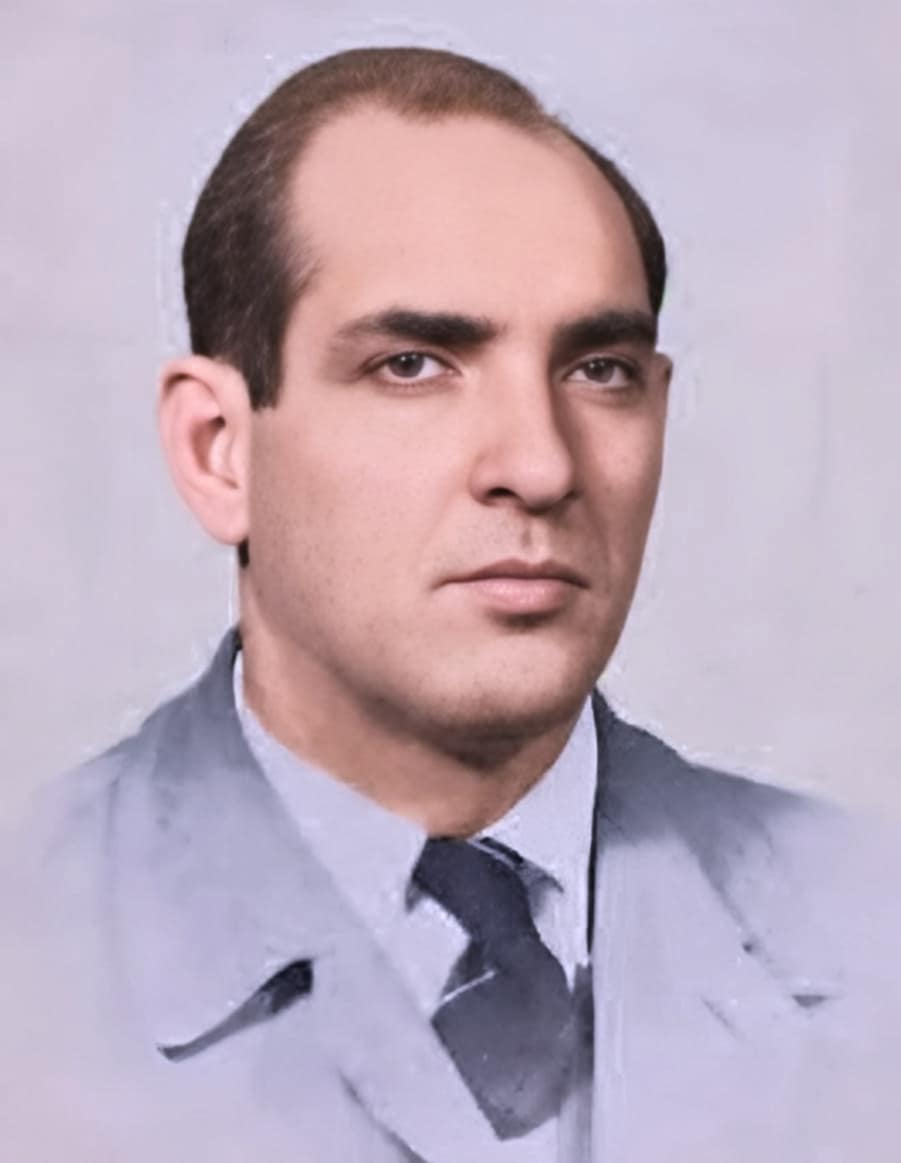
Higinio Uriarte also known as 'Gudari' was a prominent Filipino guerilla leader in Island of Negros and is one of the many Basque Filipinos and other Spanish Filipinos community who directly and indirectly helped the guerilla movement during World War II; all written in his book "A Basque Among the Guerrillas of Negros", published in 1962.

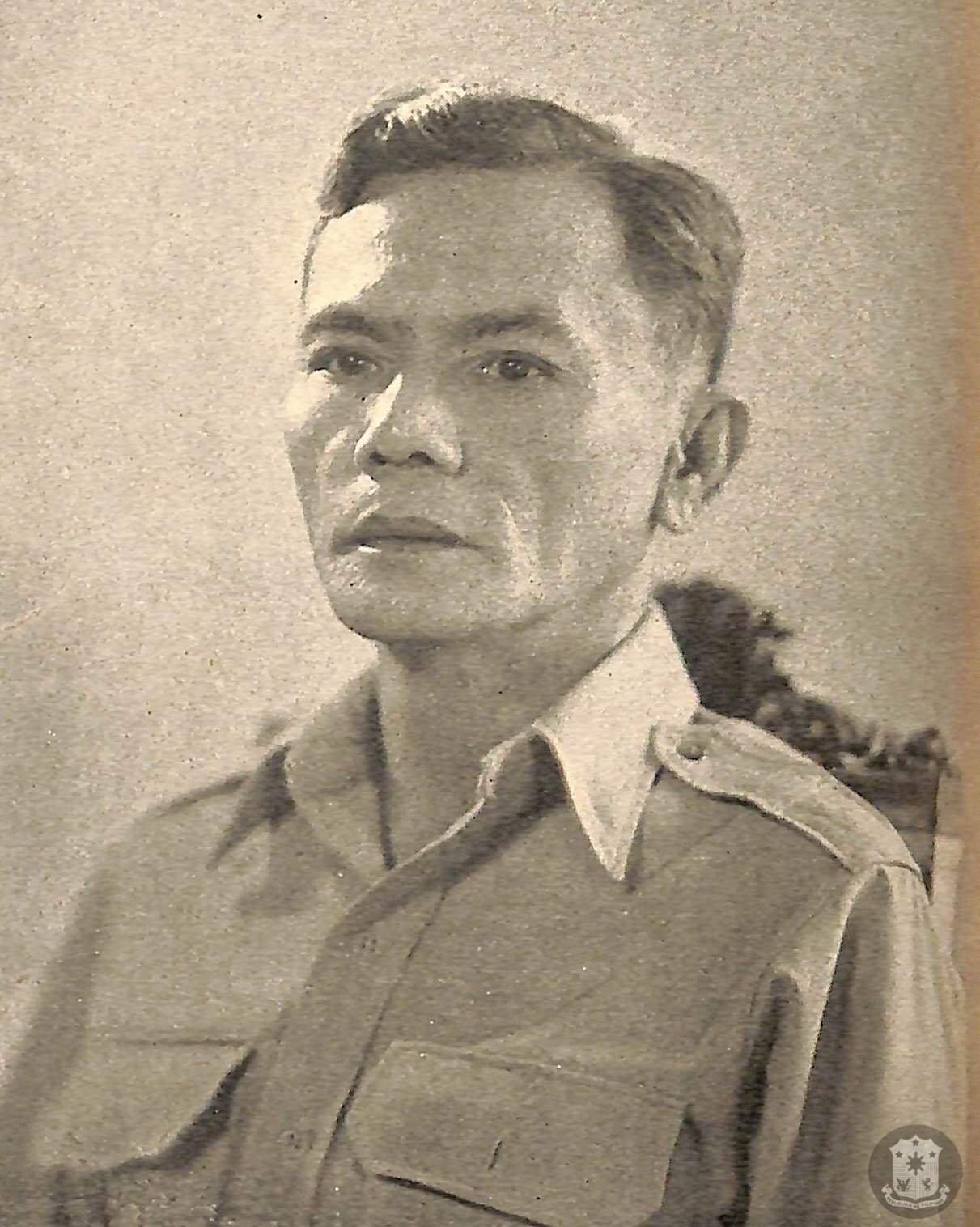
Colonel Ruperto Kangleon, hero of Leyte and Mindanao.

== End of the occupation ==
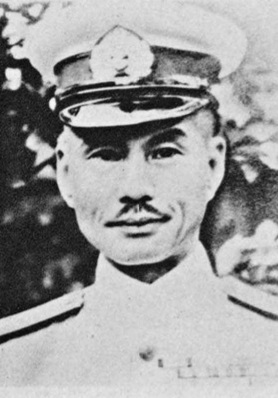
Admiral Sanji Iwabuchi disobeyed Yamashita's command to withdraw from Manila without combat to avoid the destruction of the city. His disobedience ended up with the Battle of Manila, which led to the devastation of Intramuros and its almost 400 years of historical heritage and the massacre of its people.

When General MacArthur returned to the Philippines with his army in late 1944, he was well-supplied with information; it is said that by the time MacArthur returned, he knew what every Japanese lieutenant ate for breakfast and where he had his haircut. But the return was not easy. The Japanese Imperial General Staff decided to make the Philippines their final line of defense, and to stop the American advance towards Japan. They sent every available soldier, airplane, and naval vessel to the defense of the Philippines. The kamikaze corps was created specifically to defend the Japanese occupation of the Philippines. The Battle of Leyte Gulf ended in disaster for the Japanese and was the biggest naval battle of World War II. The campaign to liberate the Philippines was the bloodiest campaign of the Pacific War. Intelligence information revealed the plans of Japanese General Yamashita to trap MacArthur's army, and they led the liberating soldiers to the Japanese fortifications.

MacArthur's Allied forces landed on the island of Leyte on October 20, 1944, accompanied by Osmeña, who had succeeded to the commonwealth presidency upon the death of Quezon on August 1, 1944. Landings then followed on the island of Mindoro and around Lingayen Gulf on the west side of Luzon, and the push toward Manila was initiated. The Commonwealth of the Philippines was restored. Fighting was fierce, particularly in the mountains of northern Luzon, where Japanese troops had retreated, and in Manila, where they put up a last-ditch resistance. The Philippine Commonwealth troops and the recognized guerrilla fighter units rose up everywhere for the final offensive. Filipino guerrillas also played a large role during the liberation. One guerrilla unit came to substitute for a regularly constituted American division, and other guerrilla forces of battalion and regimental size supplemented the efforts of the US Army units. Moreover, the cooperative Filipino population eased the problems of supply, construction, and civil administration, and furthermore eased the task of Allied forces in recapturing the country.

Fighting continued until Japan's formal surrender on September 2, 1945. The Philippines had suffered great loss of life and tremendous physical destruction by the time the war was over. An estimated 527,000 Filipinos, both military and civilians, had been killed from all causes; of these, between 131,000 and 164,000 were killed in seventy-two war crime events. According to a United States analysis released years after the war, US casualties were 10,380 dead and 36,550 wounded; Japanese dead were 255,795. Filipino deaths during the occupations, on the other hand, are estimated to be more around 527,000 (27,000 military dead, 141,000 massacred, 22,500 forced labor deaths, and 336,500 deaths due to war-related famine). The Philippine population decreased continuously for the next five years due to the spread of diseases and the lack of basic needs, far from the Filipino lifestyle before the war, when the country had been the second richest in Asia after Japan.

During the War Crimes Tribunal hearings, General Douglas MacArthur decided to withhold information about Japan's human experimentation from the war crimes tribunal in the interest of improving of American-Japanese relations amid the growing threat of communism. This prevented the persecution of thousands of Japanese soldiers and doctors. The cannibalism charges were also dropped from the hearings, benefiting Japan's interests. In the aftermath, Japan thanked the United States by giving them human experimentation data which the United States would later use in their own experimentations. Japan acknowledged MacArthur's pro-Japanese actions that minimized their consequences in the Tribunal hearings and verdicts.

== See also ==
- Emergency circulating notes
- Escape to the Hills
- Heritage Towns and Cities of the Philippines
- Hunters ROTC
- Japanese government-issued Philippine fiat peso
- Military history of the Philippines during World War II
- Santo Tomas Internment Camp
- Second Philippine Republic
- Japan–Philippines relations
