= Horace Bristol Pond =

American businessman and philanthropist

- Born: 1882

Horace Bristol Pond (born 1882) was an American business executive, philanthropist, American Red Cross personnel, World War II prisoner, and an expatriate in Manila, Philippines.

== Early life ==
He was born in 1882.

== Career ==
=== Political ===
H. B. Pond arrived in the Philippines in 1902 to work as a government stenographer.

=== Commercial ===
He joined Appleby Nauman, rose through the ranks, and became President of Pacific Commercial Company, then the largest company in the Philippines.

He was also a leader in the American community, a member of many socio-civic and cultural organizations, and a founding Director of the American Chamber of Commerce of the Philippine Islands.

In 1934 he headed a committee of American and Filipino businessmen that attempted to convince the United States government to continue free trade with the Philippines.

He was a member of the Board of Regents of the University of the Philippines.

=== Red Cross ===
In 1918 he became the first civilian president of the American Red Cross Philippine Chapter founded in 1917.

=== Cultural ===
He was President of the Metropolitan Theater Company which built the Manila Metropolitan Theater.

He was also among the top patrons and financial supporters who kept the Manila Symphony Orchestra existing and performing.

== Incarceration ==
Pond was incarcerated by the Japanese at Santo Tomas Internment Camp where he was a member of the internee government.

== Bibliography ==
- Center for Internee Rights, Inc., ed, 2002, Civilian Prisoners of the Japanese in the Philippine Islands, Paducah, Kentucky: Turner.
- Gleeck, Lewis Edward, Jr. (1912–2005), The Manila Americans (1901–1964), Manila: Carmelo & Bauermann, 1977.
- ___, Over Seventy-five Years of Philippine-American History: The Army and Navy Club of Manila, Manila: Carmelo & Bauermann, 1976.
- Stevens, Frederic Harper (1879-1982), 1946, Santo Tomas Internment Camp, New York: Stratford House.
