= Evelyn Witthoff =

Evelyn M. Witthoff (March 30, 1912 in Chicago, Illinois, United States – February 5, 2002 in Alhambra, California) was a medical doctor, missionary for the Church of the Nazarene, civilian internee, and author.

Evelyn was raised in the Church of the Nazarene and felt a strong desire to be a missionary from an early age. She received her Bachelor of Science degree from the University of Illinois and her medical degree from the University of Michigan.

She was appointed as a medical missionary to India in 1941 but was taken by the Japanese and interned at the Santo Tomas Internment Camp in the Philippines for three years. After her release, she returned to the United States until 1947, when she was reappointed to India and began her assignment at the Reynolds Memorial Hospital in Basim. In the later years of her missionary deployment, she also engaged in medical field work by taking charge of a mobile clinic unit that carried medical supplies and instruments to more remote areas. There she would address the medical needs of the people who could not easily travel to the hospital.

Dr. Witthoff's missionary assignment ended in 1973, and she joined the faculty of Olivet Nazarene College, where she taught in the nursing program until her retirement in 1977.

Dr. Witthoff, along with Geraldine V. Chappell, a Nazarene nurse, wrote the book Three Years Internment In Santo Tomas describing her time as a civilian internee. She also wrote devotionals for the Nazarene church.
