= Roy Anthony Cutaran Bennett =

Filipino editor (1913–1990)

Roy Bennett
- Born: April 6, 1913; Cagayan Valley, Philippines
- Died: November 11, 1990 (aged 77); Rosemead, California, U.S.
- Occupation: Newspaper editor
- Employer: Manila Bulletin
- Known for: Imprisonment during World War II

Roy Anthony Cutaran Bennett (April 6, 1913, Bayombong, Cagayan Valley, Philippines – November 11, 1990, Rosemead, California, US) was the editor of the Manila Bulletin before and during the Japanese invasion of the Philippines. His refusal to cooperate with the Japanese occupiers, who desired to use the newspapers as a propaganda organ under their censorship, became symbolic motivation to Filipinos to intensify their resistance.

== Imprisonment ==
For 13 months prior to liberation of the Philippines by combined American and Filipino forces in 1945, Bennett was imprisoned and tortured in Santo Tomas Internment Camp and Fort Santiago by the Japanese for his writings opposing the military expansion of the Japanese Empire. He and nine other journalists were freed in February of 1945.

== Personal life ==
Bennett was one of four children of Roy DeWitt Bennett and Josefa Camaguian Cutaran Bennett.
