= Frank Hewlett =

American journalist

Virginia and Frank Hewlett. Picture taken at Harvard University, 1946, when Frank was a Nieman Fellow.

Frank West Hewlett (1913 in Pocatello, Idaho – July 7, 1983) was an American journalist and war correspondent during World War II. He was the Manila bureau chief for United Press at the outbreak of war, and was the last reporter to leave Corregidor before it fell to the Japanese.

== Education ==
Hewlett obtained his degree from Idaho State University. He was later a Nieman Fellow at Harvard University.

== Career ==
Hewlett worked 23 years as the Washington bureau chief of The Salt Lake Tribune. Throughout his career he has worked as a reporter for the Japan Times, Seattle Times, Spokane Spokesman-Review, Tulsa World, Albuquerque Journal, Honolulu Star-Bulletin, and Guam Daily News.

Hewlett's limerick poem, "the Battling Bastards of Bataan" came to symbolize that campaign:

We're the Battling Bastards of Bataan,
No Mama, No Papa, No Uncle Sam,
No aunts, no uncles, no cousins, no nieces,
No pills, no planes, no artillery pieces,
And nobody gives a damn!

Departing Corregidor before it fell, at the instruction of Douglas MacArthur, Hewlett followed Frank Merrill in the China-Burma-India theater, then coined the term Angels of Bataan. His wife, Virginia, working for the High Commissioner to the Philippines, remained in Manila. She was interned at Santo Tomas Internment Camp and was not part of the prisoner exchange in the early part of the war, to his disappointment. They reunited during the raid to free the survivors in February 1945. She died in 1979. Later he would briefly work for the Department of Defense before returning to the private sector.

Hewlett was a member of Sigma Delta Chi and the National Press Club.

== Awards and honors ==
He won the National Headline Award in 1942 from his reporting of Bataan and Corregidor.

== Memoir ==
A memoir titled The Miracle at Santo Tomas was co-written by Frank Hewlett and Virginia Hewlett, recounting their personal experiences during World War II following the Japanese occupation of the Philippines. The memoir documents Frank Hewlett's role as a war correspondent covering the South Pacific from 1942 to 1946, as well as Virginia Hewlett's internment as a prisoner of war at Santo Tomas Internment Camp in Manila. Their dual perspectives provide a civilian and journalistic account of wartime life under Japanese control.

== Death ==
Hewlett died on July 7, 1983 at the age of 74 in Arlington, Virginia from bronchial pneumonia. He was a widower at the time of his death, and was survived by his sister, daughter, and two grandchildren.
