= Emergency circulating notes =

Currency printed by the Philippine government in exile in World War II

Peso
Unit
- Plural: pesos
- Symbol: ₱

Denominations
- Subunit
- 1/100: Centavos
- Banknotes: Various denominations (from the Philippine National Bank and the Provincial and Municipal Governments of the Commonwealth of the Philippines)

Demographics
- User(s): Philippine Commonwealth Government in exile

Issuance
- Central bank: Philippine National Bank; Provincial and Municipal Governments of the Commonwealth of the Philippines
- This infobox shows the latest status before this currency was rendered obsolete.

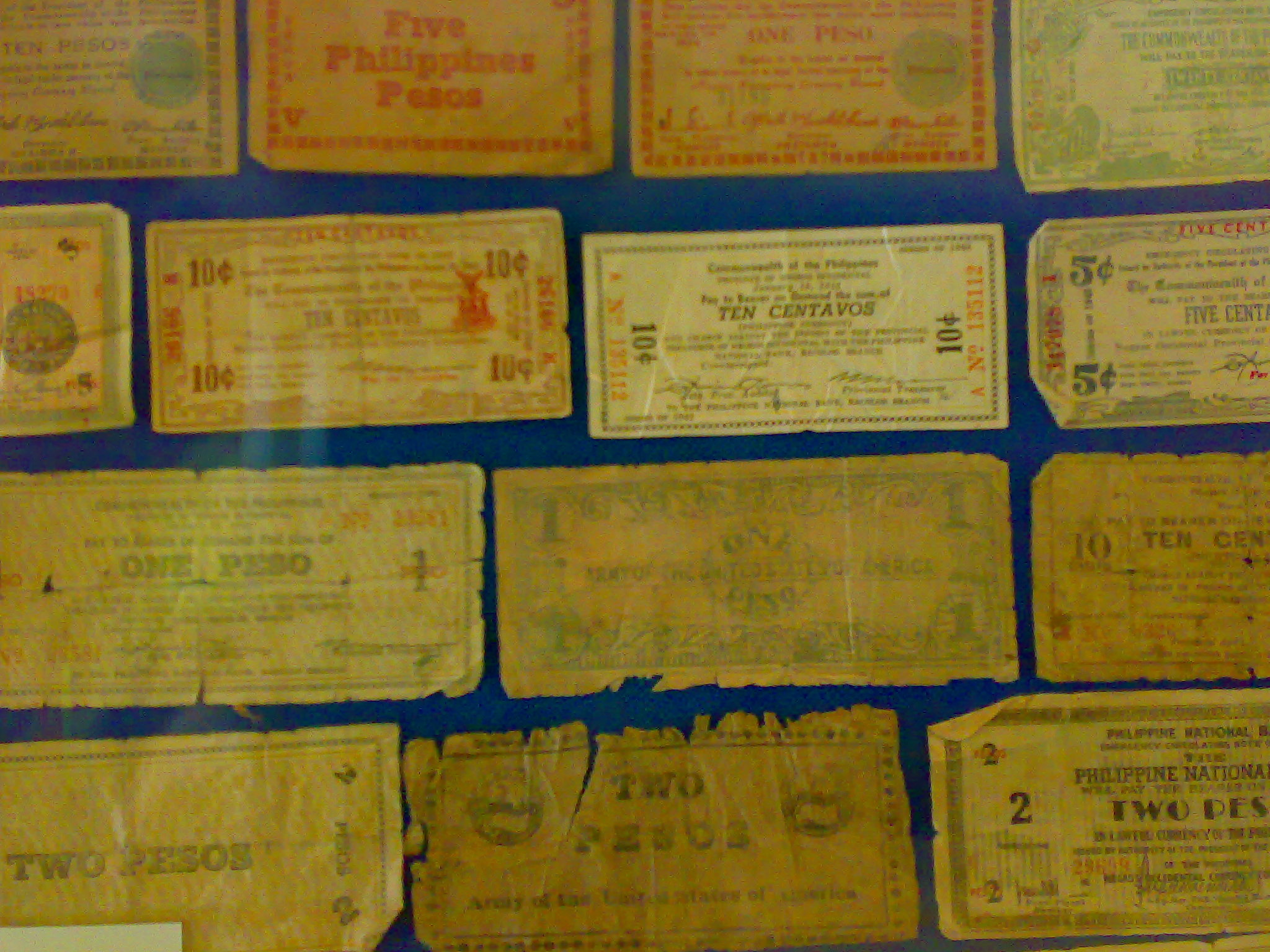
Emergency circulating notes of various denominations

Emergency circulating notes were currency printed by the Philippine Commonwealth Government in exile during World War II. These "guerrilla pesos" were printed by local government units and banks using crude inks and materials. Due to the inferior quality of these bills, they were easily mutilated.

The Japanese-sponsored Second Philippine Republic under President José P. Laurel outlawed possession of guerrilla currency and declared a monopoly on the issuance of money and anyone found to possess guerrilla notes could be arrested or even executed.

== Background ==
Prior to the impending invasion of the Philippines by the Empire of Japan and its establishment of the Japanese-sponsored Second Philippine Republic, the Philippine legislature passed an act in December 1941, enabling the production of extra Philippine peso notes for circulation as a precaution of the Philippines being cut off militarily from the United States and European countries. The notes, issued after December 29, 1941, reflected the crisis at the time, and were labeled "Emergency Circulating Notes". They were issued by the Philippine National Bank and the government of the Commonwealth of the Philippines. In addition to those issues, the Commonwealth government also allowed municipal and provincial authorities to issue notes denominated in centavos and pesos.

When military defeat in the Philippines was inevitable, the U.S. and Philippine authorities, in an effort to prevent economic resources falling into the hands of the Imperial Japanese, dumped 425 tons of centavo and peso coins into Caballo Bay. Although the Imperial Japanese authorities attempted salvage operations by forcing prisoners of war to recover the coins, they sabotaged the operation by pocketing small amounts of individual coins and using underground networks amongst POWs and resistance forces to distribute them for use by U.S. and Filipino forces. Although the influx of smuggled specie helped to provide resistance forces with currency to use, it was nowhere near sufficient, and resistance forces used alternate sources to issue their own currency.

After the Imperial Japanese forces completed their conquest of the Philippines in May 1942, all notes issued by the U.S. and Philippine administrations were outlawed, and their use carried significant risk; those found in possession of these notes would be detained, tortured and summarily executed. The notes were seized and destroyed and disappeared from circulation.

Despite the conditions facing the U.S. and Filipino resistance forces, issuing circulating currency was still needed, at the same time expressing their total resistance to the Japanese-sponsored government, began issuing their own currency. Using any materials available, resistance forces, provincial and municipal authorities all issued distinctive currencies, all denominated in centavos and pesos. Different types of currency were issued by the various resistance forces, provincial and municipal authorities. The provincial issues were authorized by the Philippine National Bank as they were unable to access stocks of notes issued by the bank throughout the war. The note's issue was organized by boards and committees throughout the provinces. Municipal issues were produced by the towns and cities of provinces independent of the government of the Commonwealth. Although the notes carried the promise that they were payable in specie, it was impossible to redeem them for their full face value throughout the war. While some of the notes were made using sophisticated equipment and high quality materials, it was still crudely produced, engraved by hand using stamps made from rubber or woodblocks, ink either made in the field or salvaged from supply depots, and paper scavenged from many different sources. The notes were labeled with the names of the provincial or municipal authority responsible for its issue, and were signed by local authorities responsible for their issue. Despite the crude production of the notes, they were still accepted throughout the country over the fiat peso used by the Japanese-sponsored government. Their value as both as a mechanism of exchange and as propaganda tools were significant enough for the Imperial Japanese to ban their use, responding violently to those possessing such notes. Torture and executions were not uncommon, and those individuals could be identified simply by possessing such notes.

After the end of World War II following the surrender of Imperial Japan, the Commonwealth government issued Republic Act No. 369, to redeem all of the currency issued by the various resistance forces, municipal and provincial authorities. They were divided into two categories: "Pre-surrender" and "Post-surrender". The former referred to the currency issued during the period commencing with the invasion of the Philippines and the occupation of any island or province by Imperial Japanese forces. This type of currency was considered to have been maintained under tighter control and were considered valuable. They were redeemed at par (100% face value). The latter referred to the many types of currency issued by the resistance forces, municipal and provincial authorities. Republic Act No. 369 provided a set of redemption for this category:

- 100% redemption for the first 500 pesos presented
- 50% redemption for amounts between 500 and 1,000 pesos
- 30% redemption for amounts between 1,000 and 10,000 pesos
- 15% redemption for amounts in excess of 10,000 pesos

Counterfeit emergency circulating notes were excluded from being exchanged.

A period of four months was allowed for the exchange of the emergency circulating notes for the post-war Philippine Commonwealth notes, which satisfied those needing to exchange the guerrilla currency following the surrender.

== Examples ==
=== Apayao ===
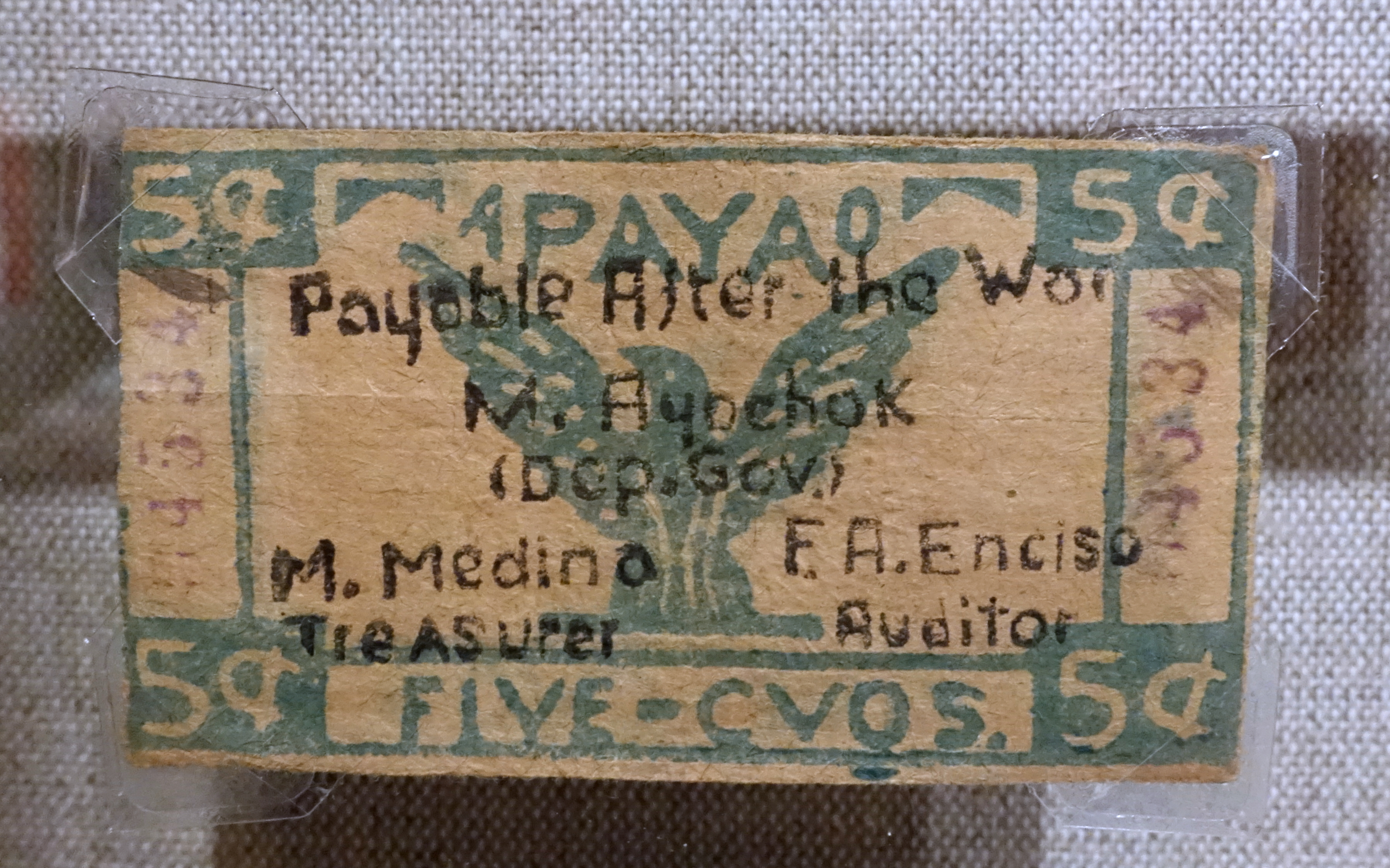
5 centavo emergency circulating note, Apayao

Apayao was one of the sub-provinces which comprised the Mountain Province during World War II. In the remote sub-province of Apayao, Deputy Governor Milton Ayochok assumed, the authority granted by President Manuel L. Quezon to print emergency currency. On September 11, 1942, the Apayao Provincial Board authorized the printing of currency to provide for the budget for fiscal year 1942–1943. A Currency Committee was formed composed of Deputy Governor Ayochok as chairman, with Deputy Treasurer M. Medina and Deputy Auditor F.A. Enciso as members.

==== First Issue (1942) ====
The First Issue was printed from hand-engraved plates. Records state that a total of ₱105,495 was issued. Printing probably took place at Kabugao, its provincial capital in conjunction with the printing of the Cagayan fourth issue.

==== Second Issue (1943) ====
The Second Issue was produced by mimeograph. Official records of this issue were captured by the Japanese. Known serial numbers would indicate that this issue equaled or possibly exceeded the previous issue and was probably intended for the fiscal year 1943–1944 budget.

=== Bohol ===
On May 22, 1942, Japanese occupation forces established garrisons at Tagbilaran, the provincial capital, and Guindulman where they operated manganese mines. On January 9, 1943, resistance officers and provincial officials who had not surrendered established a "free" government with Conrado D. Marapao as governor. Eventually its jurisdiction was established over 34 of the 35 municipalities. Just prior to the surrender, President Quezon had authorized Bohol to issue ₱150,000 in emergency currency. This authority was the basis for printing currency to finance the free government and the resistance force. The Currency Board consisted of Provincial Auditor Dalmatio Ramos as chairman, with Provincial Fiscal José C. Borromeo and Acting Provincial Treasurer Doreteo Toledo as members.

In June 1943, radio contact was established with President Quezon, who authorized an additional ₱200,000. In September, President Quezon authorized an additional ₱1 million. The printing took place in the town of Carmen. Notes were printed in black on manila paper of varying thickness, except for a few hundred notes on white paper. Serial numbers were applied in two different styles of type.

=== Cagayan ===
Cagayan was one of the provinces that issued emergency circulating notes. On January 1, 1942, in order to pay for the necessary expenditures, it issued a series of emergency circulating notes authorized by Provincial governor Marcelo Adduru after the evacuation of the entire municipal government to the municipality of Tuao, where it continued to function despite its isolation. They were issued in denominations of 50 centavos, 1, 2, 2 1/2, 4, 5, 10, 20, 50 and 200 pesos. After the first issue of emergency circulating notes was exhausted, a second issue was provided by utilizing stocks of Internal Revenue stamps and affixed them on mimeographed forms.

=== Mindanao ===
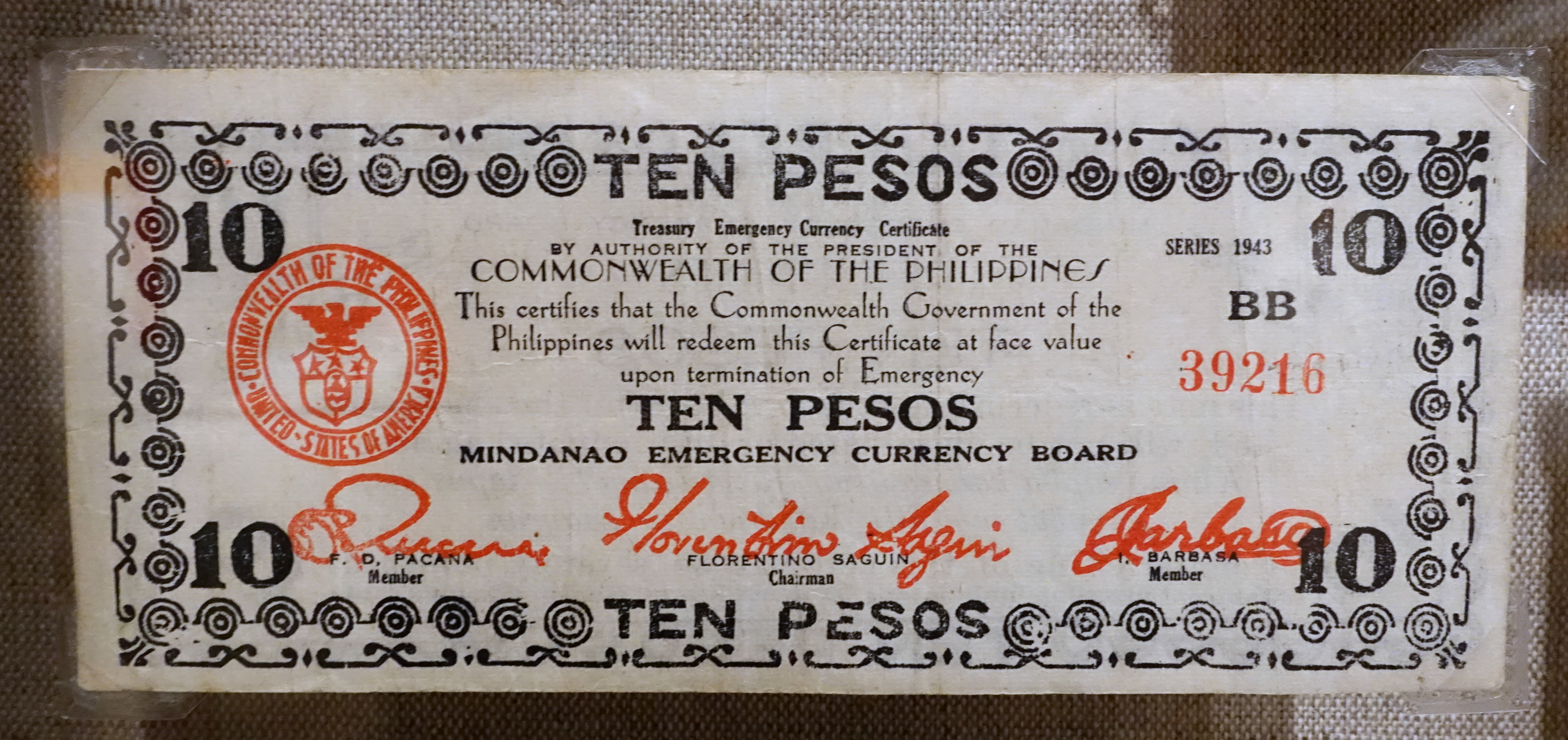
10-peso note of Series 1943, issued by the Mindanao Emergency Currency Board authorized under Wendell Fertig's forces the United States Forces in the Philippines (USFIP)

The notes issued by the Mindanao Emergency Currency Board was created as a desire to have a uniform currency for the entire island. Authorized under Wendell Fertig's forces, the United States Forces in the Philippines (USFIP), Mindanao Emergency Currency Board notes began their first issue with an undated series printed on white paper with watermarked lines. They were issued in Dansalan, Lanao province in 1942 and were issued in denominations of 2, 5, 10 and 20 pesos. They were made and issued before Imperial Japanese forces arrived on Mindanao.

The second issue of Mindanao Emergency Currency Board notes were printed in 1943, 1944 and 1945. They were the result of Sam Wilson's mint, also known as the "hit and run" mint, as they were on the move to prevent the confiscation of the notes and their capture by the Imperial Japanese. The series consisted of notes of various sizes, small size notes (5, 10 and 20 centavos), medium size notes (50 centavos and 1 peso) and large size notes (2, 5, 10 and 20 pesos). The notes were printed on Manila paper and contain the signatures of Florentino Sanguin as chairman and F.D. Panaca and I. Barbasa as members. Notes of 50 centavos and above contain the coat of arms of the Commonwealth of the Philippines while the smaller denominations do not.

The notes of the currency board were issued throughout Mindanao in response to Wendell Fertig's forces moving from one location to another after Japanese forces retaliated on the guerrilla forces ambushing their forces and carrying out sabotage operations.

== Gallery ==
1-peso Negros Occidental denomination

1-peso Negros Oriental denomination

20-peso Philippine National Bank Iloilo denomination and Roosevelt counterfeit

The portrait printed on the Negros Occidental bill is that of Quezon, who was the first president of the Commonwealth of the Philippines under U.S. sovereignty.

== See also ==
- Philippine peso
- Japanese government-issued Philippine peso

Preceded by: Philippine peso Reason: Currency used prior to the outbreak of the invasion of the Philippines by the Empire of Japan and its fall.	Currency of Philippines; 1941 – 1945	Succeeded by: Japanese government-issued Philippine peso and Emergency circulating notes Reason: Currency issued by the U.S. and Philippine administrations were outlawed by the Imperial Japanese-sponsored Second Philippine Republic and were subsequently withdrawn from circulation and destroyed, Japanese occupation notes were issued in its place and Emergency circulating notes were issued and used by resistance forces, provincial and municipal authorities in areas not occupied by Imperial Japanese forces.

Preceded by: Japanese government-issued Philippine peso, Emergency circulating notes and "Victory" pesos Reason: Declared worthless and was abandoned by retreating Japanese forces after the Leyte Landing. Emergency circulating notes were used in areas formerly occupied by Imperial Japanese forces. "Victory" pesos were brought over by Douglas MacArthur's forces to be used in tandem with the liberation of the Philippines under Imperial Japanese rule.	Currency of Philippines; 1944 – 1945	Succeeded by: Philippine peso Reason: Restoration of the Commonwealth of the Philippines after the end of World War II and the surrender of Imperial Japan, emergency circulating notes issued by resistance forces, provincial and municipal authorities were exchanged for post-war Philippine peso notes.
