= Japanese government–issued Philippine peso =

1942–1945 currency during World War II

Peso (in English and Spanish) Piso (in Filipino)
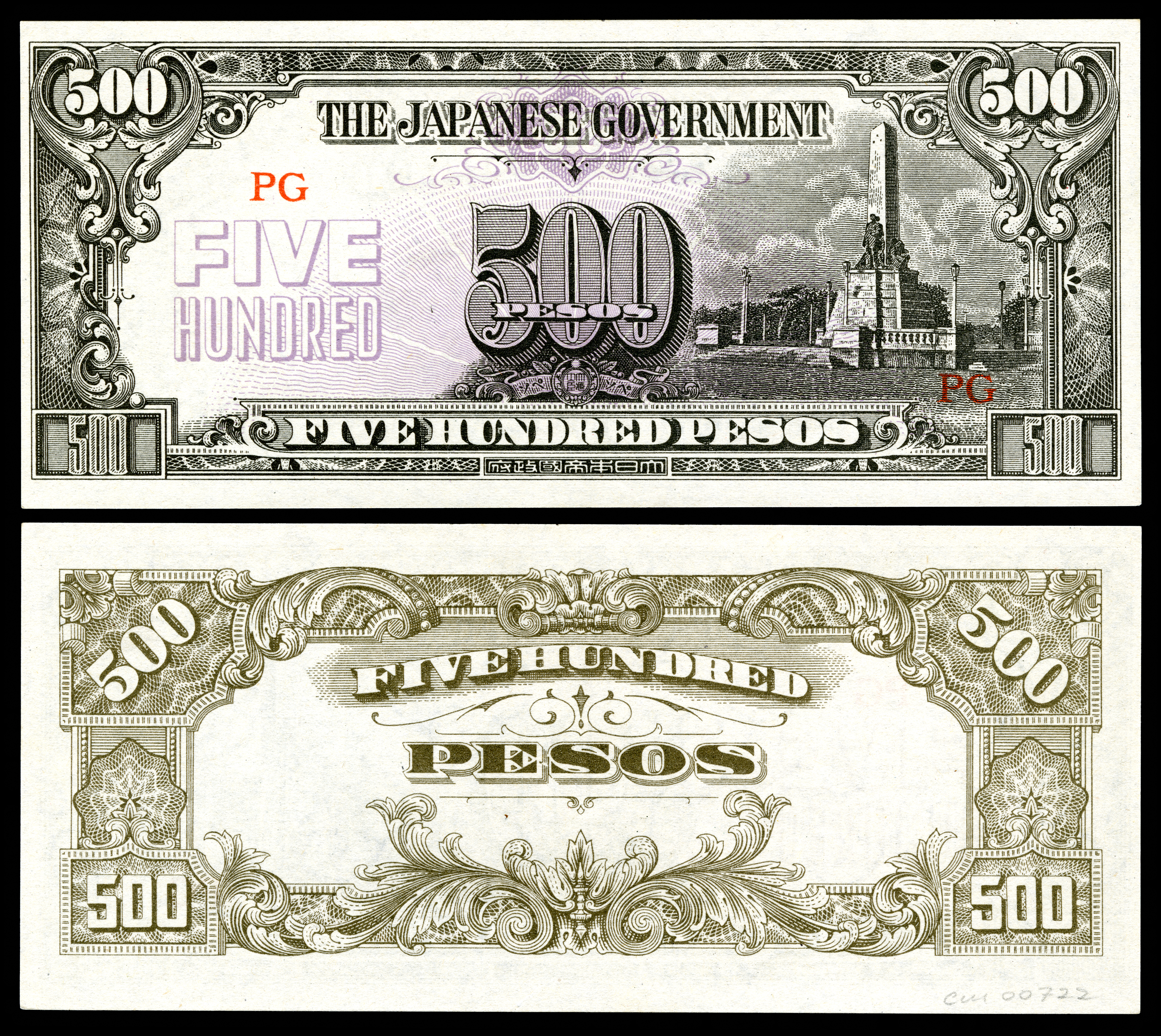
- Obverse and reverse of the 500-peso note, 1944–1945

ISO 4217
- Code: none

Unit
- Plural: pesos
- Symbol: ₱

Denominations
- Subunit
- 1/100: Cent; Centavo or Céntimo (Spanish); Sentimo (Filipino)
- Banknotes: ₱1, ₱5, ₱10, ₱100, ₱500, ₱1000

Demographics
- Date of introduction: 1942
- Date of withdrawal: 1945

Issuance
- Central bank: Bank of Japan
- This infobox shows the latest status before this currency was rendered obsolete.

During World War II in the Philippines, the occupying Japanese government issued a fiat currency in several denominations; this is known as the Japanese government–issued Philippine peso (see also Japanese invasion money). The Japanese government outlawed possession of guerrilla currency, and declared a monopoly on the issuance of money, so that anyone found to possess guerrilla notes could be arrested or even executed.

Some Filipinos called the fiat peso by the derogatory term "Mickey Mouse money". Many survivors of the war tell stories of going to the market laden with suitcases or "bayóng" (native bags made of woven coconut or buri leaf strips) overflowing with the Japanese-issued bills. According to one witness, 75 "Mickey Mouse" pesos, or about 35 U.S. dollars at that time, could buy one duck egg. In 1944, a box of matches cost more than 100 Mickey Mouse pesos.

These bills were often used by American psychological warfare personnel as propaganda leaflets. Japanese occupation banknotes were overprinted with the words "The Co-prosperity Sphere: What is it worth?", in an attempt to discredit the Greater East Asia Co-Prosperity Sphere, and dropped from Allied aircraft over the occupied territories. Towards the end of the war, the currency underwent hyperinflation, causing a rapid increase of the denomination value of notes put into circulation.

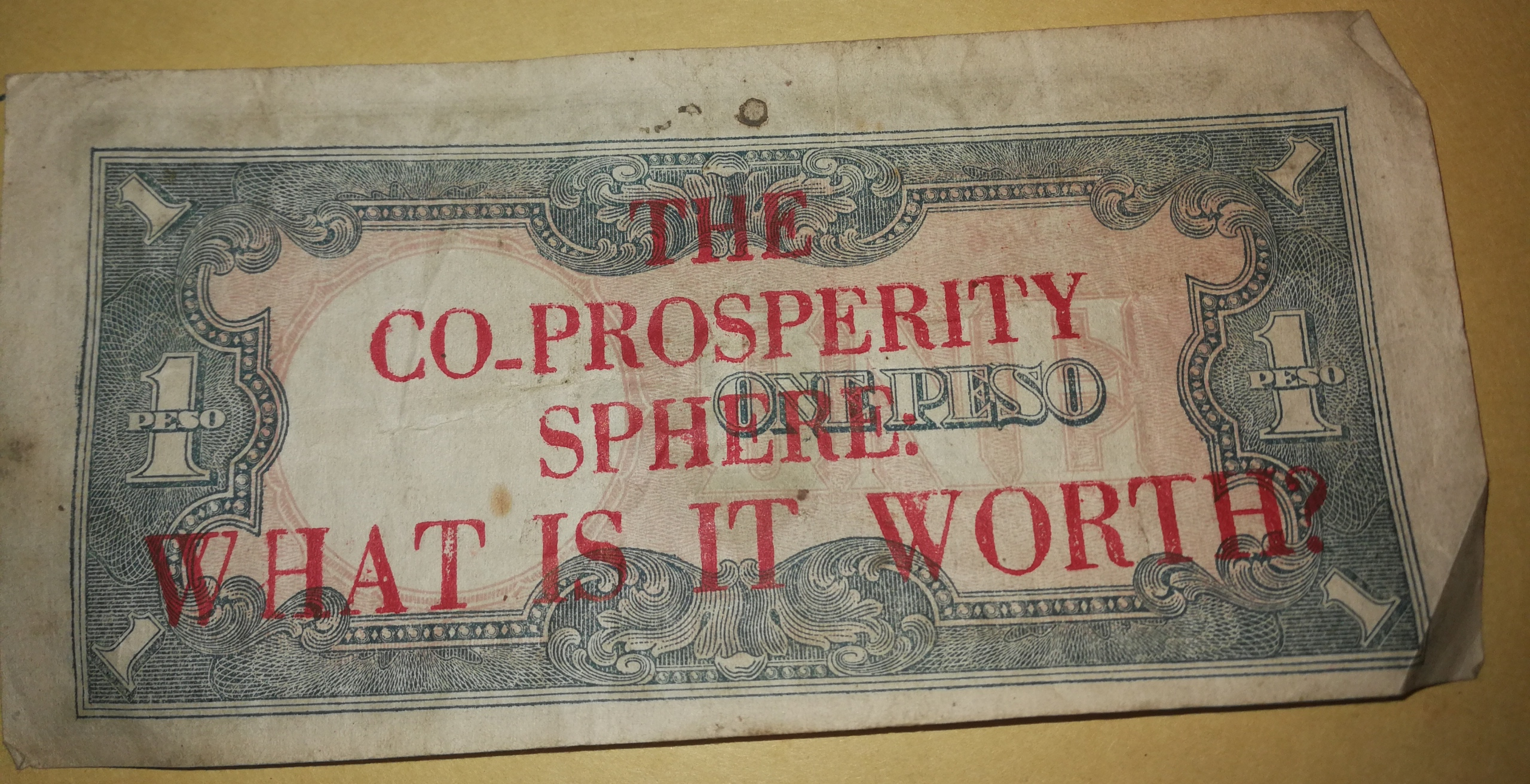
One-peso banknote with the "Co-prosperity Sphere" overprint, which was then dropped in areas occupied by the Imperial Japanese Forces as a form of psychological warfare.

== Counterfeit notes ==
The U.S. counterfeited notes throughout the war partly in an attempt to destabilize the local economy, thereby demoralizing the Japanese, and to supply guerillas fighting the Japanese. General MacArthur asked the Office of Strategic Services (OSS) to replicate the Japanese currency in the Philippines for his eventual return. By luck, a supply of paper made from plants native to Japan was located in the U.S. When that supply was exhausted the counterfeiting operation was transferred to Australia. In 1943 MacArthur requested and received the following counterfeited notes: five million 10-peso notes, three million 5-peso notes, one and a half million 1-peso notes and five hundred thousand 50-centavo notes. The American forgeries are known to have the following block letter codes:

- 50-centavo bills: PA, PB, PE, PF, PG, PH and PI
- 1-peso bills: PH
- 5-peso bills: PD
- 10-peso bills: PA, PB, and PC

== Denominations ==
=== 1942 series ===
1942 issue of the Japanese government–issued Philippine peso
Image	Value	Issue date	Series
	1 centavo	1942	First
	5 centavos	1942	First
	10 centavos	1942	First
	50 centavos	1942	First
	1 peso	1942	First
	5 pesos	1942	First
	10 pesos	1942	First

=== 1943–1945 series ===
A new series of notes in denominations of 1, 5 and 10 pesos were issued in 1943. Inflation also forced the Japanese to issue notes for 100, 500 and 1000 pesos in 1944.

1943–1945 issue of the Japanese government–issued Philippine peso
Image	Value	Issue date	Series
	1 peso	1943	Second
	5 pesos	1943	Second
	10 pesos	1943	Second
	100 pesos	1944	Second
	500 pesos	1944	Second
	1,000 pesos	1945	Second

== See also ==
- Emergency circulating notes
- Japanese government-issued dollar in Malaya, North Borneo, Sarawak and Brunei
- Philippine peso
