= Escape to the Hills =

1947 memoir by James Chapman and Ethel Chapman

- First edition
- Author: James Chapman, Ethel Chapman
- Illustrator: Drayton S. Haff
- Language: English
- Genre: Memoir
- Publisher: The Jacques Cattell Press
- Publication date: 1947
- Publication place: United States, Philippines
- Media type: Print (Hardcover)
- Pages: 247 pp

Escape to the Hills is a memoir by James and Ethel Chapman and published in 1947.

== Plot ==
The book chronicles the Chapmans of Silliman University experiences as they escape to the hills and lived as fugitives in the mountains of Negros Oriental during the Japanese invasion of the Philippines, as well as, their experiences when they were kept in the Santo Tomas Internment Camp.
